= Radical behaviorism =

Term pioneered by B.F. Skinner

Radical behaviorism is a "philosophy of the science of behavior" developed by B. F. Skinner. It refers to the philosophy behind behavior analysis, and is to be distinguished from methodological behaviorism—which has an intense emphasis on observable behaviors—by its inclusion of thinking, feeling, and other private events in the analysis of human and animal psychology. The research in behavior analysis is called the experimental analysis of behavior and the application of the field is called applied behavior analysis (ABA), which was originally termed "behavior modification."

== Radical behaviorism as natural science ==
Radical behaviorism inherits from behaviorism the position that the science of behavior is a natural science, a belief that animal behavior can be studied profitably and compared with human behavior, a strong emphasis on the environment as cause of behavior, and an emphasis on the operations involved in the modification of behavior. Radical behaviorism does not claim that organisms are tabula rasa whose behavior is unaffected by biological or genetic endowment. Rather, it asserts that experiential factors play a major role in determining the behavior of many complex organisms, and that the study of these matters is a major field of research in its own right.

== Operant psychology ==
Skinner believed that classical conditioning did not account for the behavior that many people are interested in, such as riding a bike or writing a book. His observations led him to propose a theory about how these and similar behaviors, called "operants", come about.

Roughly speaking, in operant conditioning, an operant is actively emitted and produces changes in the world (i.e., produces consequences) that alter the likelihood that the behavior will occur again.

As represented in the table below, operant conditioning involves two basic actions (increasing or decreasing the probability that a specific behavior will occur in the future), which are accomplished by adding or removing stimuli.

Stimulus	Effect: increase behavior	Effect: decrease behavior
Added	Positive reinforcement	Positive punishment
Removed	Negative reinforcement	Negative punishment

In other words:

- If the probability of a behavior is increased as a consequence of the presentation of a stimulus, that stimulus is a positive reinforcer.
- If the probability of a behavior is increased as a consequence of the withdrawal of a stimulus, that stimulus is a negative reinforcer.
- If the probability of a behavior is decreased as a consequence of the presentation of a stimulus, that stimulus is a positive punisher.
- If the probability of a behavior is decreased as a consequence of the withdrawal of a stimulus, that stimulus is a negative punisher.

Instrumental conditioning is another term for operant conditioning that is most closely associated with scientists who studied organisms running through a maze. Skinner pioneered the free operant technique, where organisms could respond at any time during a protracted experimental session. Thus Skinner's dependent variable was usually the frequency or rate of responding, not the errors that were made or the speed of traversal of a maze.

Operant conditioning affects the future of the organism, that is how the organism will respond after the actions summarized above occur.

== Explaining behavior and the importance of the environment ==
John B. Watson argued against speaking of mental states and held that psychology should study behavior directly, holding private events as impossible to study scientifically. Skinner rejected this position, conceding the importance of thinking, feelings and "inner behavior" in his analysis. Skinner did not hold to truth by agreement, as Watson did, so he was not limited by observation.

In Watson's days (and in Skinner's early days), it was held that psychology was at a disadvantage as a science because behavioral explanations should take physiology into account. Very little was known about physiology at the time. Skinner argued that behavioral explanations of psychological phenomena are "just as true" as physiological explanations. In arguing this, he took a non-reductionistic approach to psychology. Skinner, however, redefined behavior to include "everything that an organism does," including thinking, feeling and speaking, and argued that these phenomena were valid scientific subject matters. The term radical behaviorism refers to just this: that everything an organism does is a behavior. However, Skinner ruled out thinking and feeling as valid explanations of behavior. According to him, thinking and feeling are not epiphenomena nor have they any other special status; they are just more behavior to explain. Skinner proposed environmental factors as proper causes of behavior because environmental factors are at a different logical level than behavior and actions, and one can manipulate behavior by manipulating the environment. This holds only for explaining operant behaviors.

Some argue that Skinner held that the organism is a blank slate or a tabula rasa. Skinner wrote extensively on the limits and possibilities nature places on conditioning. According to him, conditioning is implemented in the body as a physiological process and is subject to the current state, learning history, and history of the species. Skinner maintained that behavior can be explained without taking into account what goes on inside the organism. However, the black box is not private events, but physiology. Skinner considers physiology useful, interesting, valid, etc., but not necessary for operant behavioral theory and research.

== Private events ==
Radical behaviorism differs from other forms of behaviorism in that it treats everything done as behavior, including private events (such as thinking and feeling) Unlike John B. Watson's behaviorism, private events are not dismissed as "epiphenomena," but are seen as subject to the same principles of learning and modification as have been discovered to exist for overt behavior. Although private events are not publicly observable behaviors, radical behaviorism accepts that one is each an observer of their own private behavior. Skinner explicitly noted that private events were essential for behaviorists to understand and account for, though he also considered them beyond the limits of direct analysis.

== Outgrowths ==
There are radical behaviorist schools of animal training, management, clinical practice, and education. Skinner's philosophical views have left their mark in principles adopted by a small handful of utopian communities, such as Los Horcones and Twin Oaks, and in ongoing challenges to aversive techniques in control of human and animal behavior.

Radical behaviorism has generated numerous descendants. Examples of these include molar approaches associated with Richard Herrnstein and William Baum, Howard Rachlin's teleological behaviorism, William Timberlake's behavior systems approach, and John Staddon's theoretical behaviorism. Contextual behavioral science, associated with the works of Steven C. Hayes, is also an interpretation of radical behaviorism.

Skinner's theories on verbal behavior have seen widespread application in therapies for autistic children that are based on applied behavior analysis (ABA).

== Criticism ==
Critics such as Noam Chomsky label Skinnerian or radical behaviorism as S–R (stimulus–response, or to use Skinner's term, "respondent"), or Pavlovian psychology, and argue that this limits the approach. Chomsky has further argued Skinner's experimental results could not be extended to humans. Contemporary psychology rejects many of Skinner's conclusions, although some scholars find his work into operant conditioning, which emphasizes the importance of consequences in modifying discriminative responses, useful when combined with current understandings about the uniqueness of evolved human thought compared to other animals.

Some argue that radical behaviorism maintains the position that animals (including humans) are passive receivers of conditioning, although others have countered that operant behavior is titled operant because it operates on the environment, it is emitted, not elicited, and that the consequence of a behavior can itself be a stimulus; one needs not present anything for shaping to take place.

Radical behaviorism is sometimes described as a form of logical positivism,. Skinnerians maintain that Skinner was not a logical positivist and recognized the importance of thinking as behavior, as Skinner emphasizes in About Behaviorism.

== See also ==
- Ogden Lindsley
- Murray Sidman
- Charles Ferster
- Allen Neuringer
- Ivar Lovaas
- The Nurture Assumption
