= Functional analysis (psychology) =

Functional analysis in behavioral psychology is the application of the laws of operant and respondent conditioning to establish the relationships between stimuli and responses. To establish the function of operant behavior, one typically examines the "four-term contingency": first by identifying the motivating operations (EO or AO), then identifying the antecedent or trigger of the behavior, identifying the behavior itself as it has been operationalized, and identifying the consequence of the behavior which continues to maintain it.

Functional assessment in behavior analysis employs principles derived from the natural science of behavior analysis to determine the "reason", purpose, or motivation for a behavior. The most robust form of functional assessment is functional analysis, which involves the direct manipulation, using some experimental design (e.g., a multielement design or a reversal design) of various antecedent and consequent events and measurement of their effects on the behavior of interest; this is the only method of functional assessment that allows for demonstration of clear cause of behavior. Experimental functional analyses generally involve several conditions where the client is exposed to potential forms of reinforcement but one (e.g., the client is given social attention, no demands are placed on them, but they aren't given access to toys). If the behavior occurs more frequently in a given condition, the behavior's function is hypothesized to gain the absent form of reinforcement (e.g., yelling to gain social attention). Most functional analyses also involve a control condition where the client is given access to all potential forms of reinforcement. If the behavior occurs frequently in this condition, the behavior is hypothesized to be automatically reinforced i.e. the behavior itself is a source of reinforcement.

== Applications in clinical psychology ==
Functional analysis and consequence analysis are commonly used in certain types of psychotherapy to better understand, and in some cases change, behavior. It is particularly common in behavioral therapies such as behavioral activation, although it is also part of Aaron Beck's cognitive therapy. In addition, functional analysis modified into a behavior chain analysis is often used in dialectical behavior therapy.

There are several advantages to using functional analysis over traditional assessment methods. Firstly, behavioral observation is more reliable than traditional self-report methods. This is because observing the individual from an objective stand point in their regular environment allows the observer to observe both the antecedent and the consequence of the problem behavior. Secondly, functional analysis is advantageous as it allows for the development of behavioral interventions, either antecedent control or consequence control, specifically designed to reduce a problem behavior. Thirdly, functional analysis is advantageous for interventions for young children or developmentally delayed children with problem behaviors, who may not be able to answer self-report questions about the reasons for their actions.

Despite these benefits, functional analysis also has some disadvantages. The first that no standard methods for determining function have been determined and meta-analysis shows that different methodologies appear to bias results toward particular functions as well as not effective in improving outcomes. Second, Gresham and colleagues (2004) in a meta-analytic review of JABA articles found that functional assessment did not produce greater effect sizes compared to simple contingency management programs. However, Gresham et al. combined the three types of functional assessment, of which descriptive assessment and indirect assessment have been reliably found to produce results with limited validity Third, although functional assessment has been conducted with a variety host of populations (i.e.) much of the current functional assessment research has been limited to children with developmental disabilities.

== Professional organizations ==
The Association for Behavioral and Cognitive Therapies (ABCT) also has an interest group in behavior analysis, which focuses on the use of behavior analysis in the school setting including functional analysis.

Doctoral level behavior analysts who are psychologists belong to the American Psychological Association's division 25 – Behavior analysis. APA offers a diplomate in behavioral psychology and school psychology both of which focus on the use of functional analysis in the school setting.

The UK Society for Behaviour Analysis also provides a forum for behavior analysts for accreditation, professional development, continuing education and networking, and serves as an advocate body in public debate on issues relating to behavior analysis. The UK-SBA promotes the ethical and effective application of the principles of behavior and learning to a wide range of areas including education, rehabilitation and health care, business and the community and is committed to maintaining the availability of high-quality evidence-based professional behavior analysis practice in the UK. The society also promotes and supports the academic field of behavior analysis with in the UK both in terms of university-based training and research, and theoretical develop.

== Variations of Functional Analyses ==
Several variations of functional analyses have been created to minimize their risk and increase their efficiency:

- Brief functional analyses – a functional analysis with fewer and shorter trials.
- Single-function functional analyses – a functional analysis that only tests for one function.
- Alone functional analyses – a functional analysis that only tests for automatic reinforcement.
- Precursor functional analyses – a functional analysis that identifies the functions of correlated behaviors, rather than the target behavior itself.
- Latency functional analyses – a functional analysis that ends sessions as soon as the client exhibits the target behavior.
- Trial based functional analyses – a functional analysis that occurs during the clients regular activities, with minimal environmental adjustments.

== See also ==
- Applied behavior analysis
- Behavioral therapy
- Clinical formulation
- Functional behavioral assessment
- Operant conditioning
- Professional practice of behavior analysis
