= Teleology =

Thinking in terms of destiny or purpose

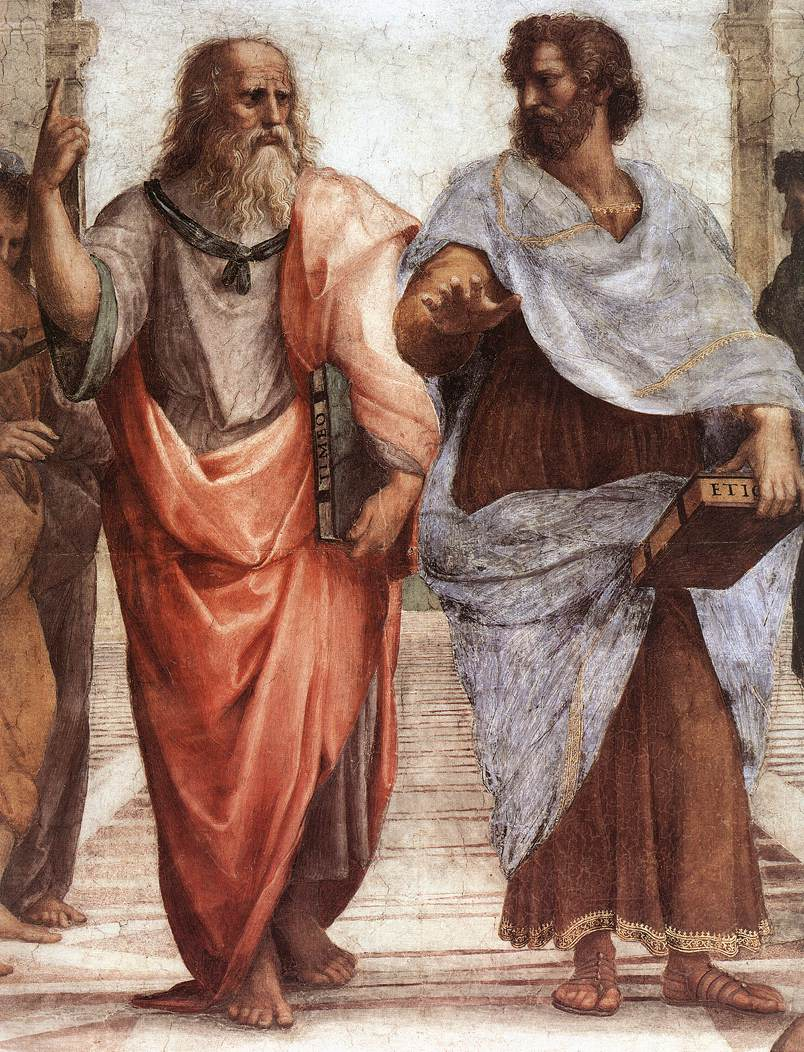
Plato (left) and Aristotle, depicted here in The School of Athens, both developed teleological arguments addressing the universe's apparent order (logos)

Teleology (from τέλος, telos, 'end', 'aim', or 'goal', and λόγος, logos, 'explanation' or 'reason') or finality is a philosophical approach that explains causality in terms of ends, purposes, or goals.

A purpose that is imposed by human use, such as the purpose of a fork to hold food, is called extrinsic. Natural teleology, common in classical philosophy, though controversial today, contends that natural entities also have intrinsic purposes, regardless of human use or opinion. For instance, Aristotle claimed that an acorn's intrinsic telos is to become a fully grown oak tree. Though ancient materialists rejected the notion of natural teleology, teleological accounts of non-personal or non-human nature were explored and often endorsed in ancient and medieval philosophies, but fell into disfavor during the modern era (1600–1900).

Much of the discussion on teleology revolves around religion and the belief in a godly, purposeful existence for the world and for humans. See Teleological argument for an in-depth discussion on teleology and religion.

== History ==
In Western philosophy, the term and concept of teleology originated in the writings of Plato and Aristotle. Aristotle's 'four causes' gives a special place to the telos or "final cause" of each thing. In this, he followed Plato in seeing purpose in both human and nonhuman nature.

=== Etymology ===
The word teleology combines Greek telos (τέλος, from τελε-, 'end' or 'purpose') and logia (-λογία, 'speak of', 'study of', or 'a branch of learning'). German philosopher Christian Wolff would coin the term as teleologia (Latin) in his work Philosophia rationalis, sive logica (1728).

=== Platonic ===
In Plato's dialogue Phaedo, Socrates argues that true explanations for any given physical phenomenon must be teleological. He bemoans those who fail to distinguish between a thing's necessary and sufficient causes, which he identifies respectively as material and final causes:

Imagine not being able to distinguish the real cause, from that without which the cause would not be able to act, as a cause. It is what the majority appear to do, like people groping in the dark; they call it a cause, thus giving it a name that does not belong to it. That is why one man surrounds the earth with a vortex to make the heavens keep it in place, another makes the air support it like a wide lid. As for their capacity of being in the best place they could be at this very time, this they do not look for, nor do they believe it to have any divine force, but they believe that they will sometime discover a stronger and more immortal Atlas to hold everything together more, and they do not believe that the truly good and 'binding' binds and holds them together.

— Plato, Phaedo, 99

Socrates here argues that while the materials that compose a body are necessary conditions for its moving or acting in a certain way, they nevertheless cannot be the sufficient condition for its moving or acting as it does. For example, if Socrates is sitting in an Athenian prison, the elasticity of his tendons is what allows him to be sitting, and so a physical description of his tendons can be listed as necessary conditions or auxiliary causes of his act of sitting. However, these are only necessary conditions of Socrates' sitting. To give a physical description of Socrates' body is to say that Socrates is sitting, but it does not give any idea why it came to be that he was sitting in the first place. To say why he was sitting and not not sitting, it is necessary to explain what it is about his sitting that is good, for all things brought about (i.e., all products of actions) are brought about because the actor saw some good in them. Thus, to give an explanation of something is to determine what about it is good. Its goodness is its actual cause—its purpose, telos or 'reason for which'.

=== Aristotelian ===
Aristotle argued that Democritus was wrong to attempt to reduce all things to mere necessity, because doing so neglects the aim, order, and "final cause", which brings about these necessary conditions:

Democritus, however, neglecting the final cause, reduces to necessity all the operations of nature. Now, they are necessary, it is true, but yet they are for a final cause and for the sake of what is best in each case. Thus nothing prevents the teeth from being formed and being shed in this way; but it is not on account of these causes but on account of the end. ...

— Aristotle, Generation of Animals 5.8, 789a8–b15

In Physics, using the hylomorphic theory, Aristotle rejects Plato's assumption that the universe was created by an intelligent designer. For Aristotle, natural ends are produced by "natures" (principles of change internal to living things), and natures, Aristotle argued, do not deliberate:

It is absurd to suppose that ends are not present [in nature] because we do not see an agent deliberating.

— Aristotle, Physics, 2.8, 199b27-9 (Note: see also Physics, 2.5–6: where "natures" are contrasted with intelligence)

These Platonic and Aristotelian arguments ran counter to those presented earlier by Democritus and later by Lucretius, both of whom were supporters of what is now often called accidentalism:

Nothing in the body is made in order that we may use it. What happens to exist is the cause of its use.

— Lucretius, De rerum natura [On the Nature of Things] 4, 833 (Note: cf. Lucretius, De rerum natura, 822–56)

== Modern philosophy ==
In the 17th century, philosophers such as René Descartes, Francis Bacon, and Thomas Hobbes wrote in opposition to Aristotelian teleology. The suggestion that there's more to objects than their materialism was rejected in favor of a mechanistic view of even complex creatures and organisms. According to Hobbes, writing in Leviathan:

Life is but a motion of limbs. For what is the heart, but a spring; and the nerves, but so many strings; and the joints, but so many wheels, giving motion to the whole body.

Bacon likewise sought to divorce the study of final causes from scientific inquiry, saying:

The handling of final causes, mixed with the rest in physical inquiries, hath intercepted the severe and diligent inquiry of all real and physical causes, and given men the occasion to stay upon these satisfactory and specious causes, to the great arrest and prejudice of further discovery. (The Advancement of Learning, Book 2)

Descartes, on the other hand, argued that whether or not final causes existed, the purposes of God in creating things were inscrutable:

I now know that my Nature is very Weak and Finite, and that the Nature of God is Immense, Incomprehensible, Infinite; from hence I must fully, understand, that he can do numberless things, the Causes whereof lie hidden to Me. Upon which account only I esteem all those Causes which are Drawn from the End (viz. Final Causes) as of no use in Natural Philosophy, for I cannot without Rashness Think myself able to Discover God's Designes.

But while science was doing a great job at explaining natural phenomena, it stopped short of explaining how life develops. In the late 18th century, Immanuel Kant acknowledged this shortcoming in his Critique of Judgement:

There will never be a Newton of the blade of grass, because human science will never be able to explain how a living being can originate from inanimate matter.

== Kant, Hegel and Marx ==
Immanuel Kant explained teleology as a subjective (false) perception, necessary for humans to understand the world, but in actuality, not a determining factor in biology or even in human personal and social behavior. Biological behavior, reacting to "self-preservation" criteria, is an outcome of Darwinist-like adaptation, with the organisms having "intrinsic and natural purposiveness". (Note: Darwin's theory on evolution was published only after Kant's death.)

Wilhelm Hegel opposed Kant's view and claimed it was legitimate for a materialistic view to accept "high" intrinsic teleology, where organisms, or at least the human self-conscious mind, and following it, whole societies are capable of determining and deciding their actions, for self-preservation and awareness, and the human pursuit of self-conscious freedom. This, according to Kant, differs from the "low" teleology where an entity decides to use external means for its own goal, which was the religious claim about god or some "high" entity with its own agenda for the world and humans.

In The Science of Logic, and more elaborately in Phenomenology of Spirit (1807), Hegel wrote that life occurs when a body advances from "mechanism" and "chemism" to acquire the goals of self-preservation and "self-realization", and acts accordingly. History (meaning the sequences of human behavior), according to him, is the outcome of humanity becoming conscious of its own freedom through social antagonism and self-recognition and changing from an irrational and unaware state to a free, rational, self-conscious state of being.

Hegel's basic theory is that every idea being realized has a stage of thesis where its flaws are revealed, creating an antithesis, which resolves those flaws but has flaws of its own, and finally the two clash and a new, improved synthesis is created. This process continues with the ideas advancing and becoming better and refined. History, according to Hegel, is actually this realization of ideas through clashing and refinement.

Leaning on these notions, Karl Marx wrote with teleological terminology that society advances through cultural clashes between classes striving for material economic goals, struggling through revolution with the ruling classes inherent to capitalism, until finally society will establish a classless commune. Since Marx is speaking about a scientific explanation to history and social behavior, many explain this as being consequentialist, with the culture clash caused by the existence of unequal classes and the lack of economic wealth by the lower classes, leading to an open, non-deterministic result caused by the situation and the collective behavior in response to it.

== Postmodern philosophy ==
Teleological-based "grand narratives" are renounced by the postmodern tradition, where teleology may be viewed as reductive, exclusionary, and harmful to those whose stories are diminished or overlooked.

Against this postmodern position, Alasdair MacIntyre has argued that a narrative understanding of oneself, of one's capacity as an independent reasoner, one's dependence on others and on the social practices and traditions in which one participates, all tend towards an ultimate good of liberation. Social practices may themselves be understood as teleologically oriented to internal goods. For example, practices of philosophical and scientific inquiry are teleologically ordered to the elaboration of a true understanding of their objects. MacIntyre's After Virtue (1981) famously dismissed the naturalistic teleology of Aristotle's "metaphysical biology", but he has cautiously moved from that book's account of a sociological teleology toward an exploration of what remains valid in a more traditional teleological naturalism.

== Ethics ==
Teleology significantly informs the study of ethics, such as in:

- Business ethics: People in business commonly think in terms of purposeful action, as in, for example, management by objectives. Teleological analysis of business ethics leads to consideration of the full range of stakeholders in any business decision, including the management, the staff, the customers, the shareholders, the country, humanity, and the environment.
- Medical ethics: Teleology provides a moral basis for the professional ethics of medicine, as physicians are generally concerned with outcomes and must therefore know the telos of a given treatment paradigm.

=== Consequentialism ===
The broad spectrum of consequentialist ethics—of which utilitarianism is a well-known example—focuses on the result or consequences, with such principles as John Stuart Mill's 'principle of utility': "the greatest good for the greatest number". This principle is thus teleological, though in a broader sense than is elsewhere understood in philosophy.

In the classical notion, teleology is grounded in the inherent nature of things themselves, whereas in consequentialism, teleology is imposed on nature from outside by the human will. Consequentialist theories justify inherently what most people would call evil acts by their desirable outcomes, if the good of the outcome outweighs the bad of the act. So, for example, a consequentialist theory would say it was acceptable to kill one person in order to save two or more other people. These theories may be summarized by the maxim "the end justifies the means."

=== Deontology ===
Consequentialism stands in contrast to the more classical notions of deontological ethics, an example of which is Immanuel Kant's categorical imperative.

In deontological ethics, the goodness or badness of individual acts is primary and a larger, more desirable goal is insufficient to justify bad acts committed on the way to that goal, even if the bad acts are relatively minor and the goal is major (like telling a small lie to prevent a war and save millions of lives). In requiring all constituent acts to be good, deontological ethics is much more rigid than consequentialism, which varies by circumstance.

Practical ethics are usually a mix of the two. For example, Mill also relies on deontic maxims to guide practical behavior, but they must be justifiable by the principle of utility.

== Economics ==
A teleology of human aims played a crucial role in the work of economist Ludwig von Mises, especially in the development of his science of praxeology. Mises believed that an individual's action is teleological because it is governed by the existence of their chosen ends. In other words, individuals select what they believe to be the most appropriate means to achieve a sought after goal or end. Mises also stressed that, with respect to human action, teleology is not independent of causality: "No action can be devised and ventured upon without definite ideas about the relation of cause and effect, teleology presupposes causality."

Assuming reason and action to be predominantly influenced by ideological credence, Mises derived his portrayal of human motivation from Epicurean teachings, insofar as he assumes "atomistic individualism, teleology, and libertarianism, and defines man as an egoist who seeks a maximum of happiness" (i.e. the ultimate pursuit of pleasure over pain). "Man strives for," Mises remarks, "but never attains the perfect state of happiness described by Epicurus." Furthermore, expanding upon the Epicurean groundwork, Mises formalized his conception of pleasure and pain by assigning each specific meaning, allowing him to extrapolate his conception of attainable happiness to a critique of liberal versus socialist ideological societies. It is there, in his application of Epicurean belief to political theory, that Mises flouts Marxist theory, considering labor to be one of many of man's 'pains', a consideration which positioned labor as a violation of his original Epicurean assumption of man's manifest hedonistic pursuit. From here he further postulates a critical distinction between introversive labor and extroversive labor, further diverging from basic Marxist theory, in which Marx hails labor as man's "species-essence", or his "species-activity".

== Science ==
Modern science sees the 'reason' for an event as causality. In cases of teleonomy, wordings suggesting purpose are preferred to be avoided. For example, using teleological wording as an explanatory style within evolutionary biology is somewhat controversial.

Since the Novum Organum of Francis Bacon, teleological explanations in physical science tend to be deliberately avoided in favor of focus on material and efficient explanations, although some recent accounts of quantum phenomena make use of teleology. Final and formal causation came to be viewed as false or too subjective. (Note: "The received intellectual tradition has it that, in the sixteenth and seventeenth centuries, revolutionary philosophers began to curtail and reject the teleology of the medieval and scholastic Aristotelians, abandoning final causes in favor of a purely mechanistic model of the Universe." Johnson, Monte Ransom (2008), Aristotle on Teleology, Oxford University Press. pp. 23–24.) Nonetheless, some disciplines, in particular within evolutionary biology, continue to use language that appears teleological in describing natural tendencies towards certain end conditions. Some suggest, however, that these arguments ought to be, and practicably can be, rephrased in non-teleological forms; others hold that teleological language cannot always be easily expunged from descriptions in the life sciences, at least within the bounds of practical pedagogy.

Contemporary philosophers and scientists still debate whether teleological axioms are useful or accurate in proposing modern philosophies and scientific theories. An example of the reintroduction of teleology into modern language is the notion of an attractor. Another instance is when Thomas Nagel (2012), though not a biologist, proposed a non-Darwinian account of evolution that incorporates impersonal and natural teleological laws to explain the existence of life, consciousness, rationality, and objective value. Regardless, the accuracy can also be considered independently from the usefulness: it is a common experience in pedagogy that a minimum of apparent teleology can be useful in thinking about and explaining Darwinian evolution even if there is no true teleology driving evolution. Thus, it is easier to say that evolution "gave" wolves sharp canine teeth because those teeth "serve the purpose of" predation regardless of whether there is an underlying non-teleologic reality in which evolution is not an actor with intentions. In other words, because human cognition and learning often rely on the narrative structure of stories – with actors, goals, and immediate (proximate) rather than ultimate (distal) causation (see also proximate and ultimate causation) – some minimal level of teleology might be recognized as useful or at least tolerable for practical purposes even by people who reject its cosmologic accuracy. Its accuracy is upheld by Barrow and Tipler (1986), whose citations of such teleologists as Max Planck and Norbert Wiener are significant for scientific endeavor.

=== Biology ===
Apparent teleology is a recurring issue in evolutionary biology, much to the consternation of some writers.

Statements implying that nature has goals, for example, where a species is said to do something "in order to" achieve survival, appear teleological, and therefore invalid. Usually, it is possible to rewrite such sentences to avoid the apparent teleology. Some biology courses have incorporated exercises requiring students to rephrase such sentences so that they do not read teleologically. Nevertheless, biologists still frequently write in a way which can be read as implying teleology even if that is not the intention. John Reiss argues that evolutionary biology can be purged of such teleology by rejecting the analogy of natural selection as a watchmaker. Other arguments against this analogy have also been promoted by writers such as Richard Dawkins.

Some authors, like James Lennox, have argued that Darwin was a teleologist, while others, such as Michael Ghiselin, describe this claim as a myth promoted by misinterpretations of his discussions and emphasized the distinction between using teleological metaphors and being teleological.

Biologist philosopher Francisco Ayala has argued that all statements about processes can be trivially translated into teleological statements, and vice versa, but that teleological statements are more explanatory and cannot be disposed of. Karen Neander has argued that the modern concept of biological 'function' is dependent upon selection. So, for example, it is not possible to say that anything that simply winks into existence without going through a process of selection has functions. We decide whether an appendage has a function by analysing the process of selection that led to it. Therefore, any talk of functions must be posterior to natural selection and function cannot be defined in the manner advocated by Reiss and Dawkins.

Ernst Mayr states that "adaptedness ... is an a posteriori result rather than an a priori goal-seeking". Various commentators view the teleological phrases used in modern evolutionary biology as a type of shorthand. For example, Simon Hugh Piper Maddrell writes that "the proper but cumbersome way of describing change by evolutionary adaptation [may be] substituted by shorter overtly teleological statements" for the sake of saving space, but that this "should not be taken to imply that evolution proceeds by anything other than from mutations arising by chance, with those that impart an advantage being retained by natural selection". Likewise, J. B. S. Haldane says, "Teleology is like a mistress to a biologist: he cannot live without her but he's unwilling to be seen with her in public."

=== Cybernetics ===
Cybernetics is the study of the communication and control of regulatory feedback both in living beings and machines, and in combinations of the two.

Arturo Rosenblueth, Norbert Wiener, and Julian Bigelow classified behaviors as purposeful when there seems to be a goal directing that behavior, but non-purposeful when the causality is clear. Hence, a rock falling is non-purposeful, but the action of a rocket (fired by humans) is perhaps purposeful. They then divided the classification into teleological — if the targeted behavior was receiving feedback of any sort, or non-teleological, if on its way to the goal, there was no processing of feedback. So even machinery can be teleological, if it has a feedback mechanism. Wiener coined the term cybernetics to denote the study of "teleological mechanisms". In the cybernetic classification presented by Rosenblueth, Wiener, and Bigelow, teleology is feedback controlled purpose. Thus, decision making and intelligent or purposeful behavior, by any object, including machines, computers, living beings, humans, and societies, is a process in time that begins through physical, well-understood stages, caused by physical phenomena, processed by physically materialistic biochemical and physiological constructs of machinery or computers. In the case of biological behavior, the physical input is processed by neurons, brain parts, glands and hormonal interactions, interacting with previously stored learned or inherited biological constructs that result in actions which lead to the self preservation of the organism, with an emerging causality-based teleology.

The classification system underlying cybernetics has been criticized by Frank Honywill George and Les Johnson, who cite the need for an external observability to the purposeful behavior in order to establish and validate the goal-seeking behavior. Just because it seems to have a mechanism for accepting feedback does not necessitate that a machine is now "behaving teleologically". The fact that some phenomena is being observed and changed by the feedback mechanism, is well understood objective control, but the part of the mechanism that is doing the observing and takes part in self preservation in living beings is not the same as a machine with feedback. The living being (or at least the human brain) has "subjective autonomy".

== See also ==
- Anthropic principle – Hypothesis about sapient life and the universe
- Causality – How one process influences another
- Chicken or the egg – Causality dilemma
- Cybernetics – Study of circular causal processes
- Destiny – Predetermined course of events
- Dysteleology – Philosophical view that existence has no final goal
- Ed Ricketts – American marine biologist (1897–1948)
- Expiration date -- Determined date to end the use of something
- Efficient cause – Topic in Aristotelian philosophy
- Final cause – Topic in Aristotelian philosophy
- Emergence – Unpredictable phenomenon in complex systems
- Four causes – Topic in Aristotelian philosophy
- Ludwig von Mises – Austrian–American political economist (1881–1973)
- Moirai – Personifications of fate in Greek mythology
- Naturalism (philosophy) – Belief that only natural laws and forces operate in the universe
- Orthogenesis – Hypothesis that organisms have an innate tendency to evolve towards some goal
- Rationalism – Epistemological view centered on reason
- Telesis – Philosophy on social advancement
- Teleological argument – Argument for the existence of God
- Teleological behaviorism – Type of behaviorism
- Teleomechanism – Principle that mechanism is compatible with teleology
- Teleonomy – Apparent purposefulness brought about by natural processes
- Telos – Aristototelian concept of an object's final cause
