= Functional behavior assessment =

Element of behavior modification

Functional behavior assessment (FBA) is an ongoing process of collecting information with a goal of identifying the environmental variables that control a problem or target behavior. The purpose of the assessment is to prove and aid the effectiveness of the interventions or treatments used to help eliminate the problem behavior. Through functional behavior assessments, we have learned that there are complex patterns to people's seemingly unproductive behaviors. It is important to not only pay attention to consequences that follow the behavior but also the antecedent that evokes the behavior. More work needs to be done in the future with functional assessment including balancing precision and efficiency, being more specific with variables involved and a more smooth transition from assessment to intervention.

== Definition ==
Functional behavior assessment (FBA) is a method developed by applied behavior analysis (ABA) to identify the variables that maintain a problem behavior. Behavior is lawful. Whether it is desirable or undesirable, behavior is controlled by environmental variables. Behavior is a function of the antecedent and consequences that make up the three-term contingency. Functional assessment is the process of gathering information about the antecedent stimuli and consequences functional to the problem behavior. It attempts to provide an explanation to why the problem behavior may be occurring. The information about the antecedent stimuli may include the time and place, the presence of others and the frequency. The information collected helps identify which of the antecedent and consequences are maintaining the behavior. The information collected from functional assessment can also help develop appropriate treatments for the target behavior. Stimulus that may have been found to be reinforcing for the original behavior could be transferred to reinforce a more appropriate behavior.

== Functions of problem behavior ==
The purpose of conducting a functional assessment is to identify the function of the target behavior. There are four main classes of functions of problem behavior.

=== Social positive reinforcement ===
Social positive reinforcement is when another person delivers a positive reinforcement after the problem behavior occurs. This is include the giving of attention, fun activities or goods and services provided by the person. An example of social positive reinforcement would be Max's mother (social) dropping what she is doing and provide attention (positive reinforcement) to her son when he engages in head banging on the wall (problem behavior).

=== Social negative reinforcement ===
Social negative reinforcement is when another person delivers a negative reinforcement after the problem behavior occurs. The person may terminate an aversive stimuli (interaction, task or activity) and the behavior is more likely to be maintained. An example of social negative reinforcement would be Max complains (problem behavior) to his parents (social) when he is asked to do chores, as a result, his parents allows him to escape the task (negative reinforcement).

=== Automatic positive reinforcement ===
Automatic positive reinforcement is when a positive reinforcement occurs automatically and is not mediated by another person. The behavior is strengthened by an automatic reinforcing consequence. An example of automatic positive reinforcement would be an autistic child waving his hands in front of his face (problem behavior) because the sensory stimulation (automatic positive reinforcement) produced is reinforcing for the child.

=== Automatic negative reinforcement ===
Automatic negative reinforcement is when a negative reinforcement occurs automatically reducing or eliminating an aversive stimulus as a reinforcing consequence of the behavior. A popular example of automatic negative reinforcement would be binge eating. Binge eating (problem behavior) had been found to temporarily reduce any unpleasant emotions the person may be experiencing before the binge (automatic negative reinforcement).

== Assessment methods ==
There are various different methods used to conduct functional assessment, all of which falls into three distinct categories.

=== Indirect methods ===
Indirect functional assessment methods use behavior interviews or surveys to gather information about the person exhibiting the behavior from themselves others who know this person well. The main advantage of indirect methods is they are easy and cheap to conduct and do not take much time. The main disadvantage of indirect methods is that the people involved are relying on their memories, thus some information may be lost or inaccurate.

Because of their convenience, indirect methods are used most commonly. It is essential assessment to be clear and objective as this will produce the most accurate answers without interpretation. The goal of the indirect assessment method is to generate information on the antecedent, behavior and consequence that can help generate a hypothesis about the variables that maintains the behavior.

Indirect methods can help develop a correlation hypothesis but not a functional relationship.

=== Direct observation methods ===
Direct observation methods involve is present to observe and record the problem behavior as it occurs. The goal of direct observation is to record the immediate antecedent and consequences that functions with the problem behavior within a natural environment. The main advantage of direct observation is that the antecedents and consequences are recorded as it happens instead of recollection of memory. Therefore, the information recorded is generally more accurate. The main disadvantage of direct observation is it requires a considerable amount of time and effort to implement. Another thing about direct observation is, like indirect methods, it can only demonstrate a correlation but not a functional relationship.

The observer of the direct observation method should be present in the natural environment when the problem behavior is most likely to occur. The observer should also be trained to record the problem behavior and its functional antecedent and consequences immediately, correctly and objectively.

Direct observation can also be an ABC observation. Together with indirect methods, direct and indirect assessments are categorized as descriptive assessment because the antecedent and consequences are described from with memory of events. The information collected aids the development of a hypothesis, but to demonstrate a functional relationship, one must use the experimental method.

=== Experimental methods ===
Experimental methods involve manipulating either the antecedent or consequent variables to determine their influence on the problem behavior. This is the only method that can demonstrate a functional relationship between the antecedent stimulus or the reinforcing consequence and the problem behavior. The main advantage of the experimental method is the demonstration of a functional relationship. The main disadvantage of the experimental method is the extensive use of time and effort to create an experiment.

Experimental methods can also be called experimental analysis or functional analysis.

== Conducting a functional assessment ==
A functional assessment should always be conducted before treating a problem behavior. To develop appropriate treatment, one must have the correct information about the antecedents and consequences controlling the behavior because treatment involves manipulating these environmental events to evoke a change in the problem behavior. Here is the proper procedure to correctly implement a functional assessment.

1. The first step should start with a behavioral interview with the client or someone who knows him/her well.
2. The interview from the first step should help develop a hypothesis about which antecedent would produce the behavior and which reinforcing consequence would maintain it.
3. Once a hypothesis has been formed, the next step is to conduct a direct observation assessment in the natural environment. If the data collected from the interview is consistent with the observation, the validity of the hypothesis is strengthened.
4. With the information from both sources being consistent, confirm your initial hypothesis to develop appropriate treatment plans for the identified antecedent and consequence.
5. If the data collected from the behavioral interview and the information observed from the direct observation is inconsistent, conduct further assessments such as another interview or continued observation to clear up any of the inconsistencies.
6. If after review and extra interviews and further observations, the information collected are still inconsistent, it is time to conduct a functional analysis. A functional analysis is also need if the information is consistent but can not lead to a conclusive, firm hypothesis about the predictably of the antecedent and consequence.

== Functional interventions ==
After a functional behavior assessment has been conducted, the information collected is used to develop treatments and interventions. These may be formalized into a Behavior intervention plan (BIP), which outlines strategies to reduce challenging behaviors and teach functional alternatives across environments. Interventions are designed to manipulate the antecedent or/and the consequence of the problem behavior to decrease its occurrence rate and increase the rate of occurrence of functional replacement behaviors.

Functional interventions include extinction, differential reinforcement and antecedent manipulations. These interventions are functional because they address the environmental events that maintain the problem behavior. They are also non-aversive, as punishment is not involved.

More aversive interventions can be used as a latter resort if previous non-aversive interventions have been tried and shown ineffective. Punishment such as time-out and response cost are considered negative punishment, which—although still controversial—is more widely accepted than positive punishment such as overcorrection, contingent exercise, guided compliance, and physical restraint. As mentioned, punishment should only be used as a last resort when other methods have already been considered.

== Research ==
A lot of research being done with functional assessment deals with self injurious behaviors of mentally challenged children or adults and autistic children.

Carr, Newsom and Binkoff conducted an experimental method of functional assessment on two boys with intellectual disabilities exhibiting aggressive behaviors. They hypothesized that their aggressive behaviors were maintained by escape from academic tasks. To test their hypothesis, they set two different experimental conditions; 1. Academic demands were put on the boys, 2. Academic demands were not put on the children. If their hypothesis is true, then the problem behavior should occur much more often in the first condition than the second. Results show that their hypothesis was indeed true as the aggressive behavior occurred at a much higher frequency in the first condition. The researchers concluded that the boy's problem behavior was indeed maintained by the antecedent of academic demands and the consequence of escape from the demands.

Another functional assessment research done by Brian Iwata in 1982 worked with children with developmental disabilities showing self injurious behaviors. The research could not conclude what was maintaining their behavior but believed it was either adult attention, escape from demands or sensory stimulation from the injuries. For each of the hypotheses, they created a condition that would fit into the category. For adult attention hypothesis, they created an environment where an adult is in the room with the child but pays no attention to him/her until after the behavior occurs. For the escape from demands hypothesis, they had an adult make a normal demand towards the child, but terminate it if the self injurious behavior occurs. For the sensory stimulation hypothesis, the child is left alone without the presence of anyone or any stimulating activities. Iwata compared the levels of self injurious behaviors across the three conditions and demonstrated that the function of the problem behavior for each child was different. Some wanted attention, others escaped while some were maintained by automatic reinforcement. As shown here, it is very important to conduct a functional assessment to determine what exactly is maintaining the behavior before any function interventions are taken.

== See also ==
- Behavior modification
- Behavioral targeting
- Functional analysis (psychology)
