= Contingent beneficiary =

A contingent beneficiary is someone who benefits from a contingent contract; they profit from a promise, which may or may be fulfilled, to do or abstain from doing a certain thing. This matter itself is realized only on the happening of some future uncertain event.

In the context of an insurance policy, the condition is generally the death of the insurance contract holder; the party who benefits is referred to as the primary beneficiary.

== Use in insurance and retirement accounts ==
The term contingent beneficiary is commonly used in life insurance, annuities, and retirement accounts to identify a secondary beneficiary who receives the proceeds if the primary beneficiary cannot or does not take them. FINRA explains that investors can name contingent beneficiaries in case the primary beneficiaries predecease them, cannot be located, or decline the assets.

In retirement-plan administration, the IRS likewise uses the term when describing beneficiary designations. IRS guidance notes that spousal consent documents may identify a specific nonspouse beneficiary, including any contingent beneficiaries.
