= Contingency management =

Concept in psychology

Contingency management (CM) is the application of the three-term contingency (or operant conditioning), which uses stimulus control and consequences to change behavior. CM originally derived from the science of applied behavior analysis (ABA), but it is sometimes implemented from a cognitive behavioral therapy (CBT) framework as well.

Incentive-based contingency management is well-established when used as a clinical behavior analysis (CBA) treatment for substance use disorders, which entails that patients earn money (vouchers) or other incentives (i.e., prizes) as a reward to reinforce drug abstinence (and, less often, punishment if they fail to adhere to program rules and regulations or their treatment plan). Another popular approach based on CM for alcoholism is the community reinforcement approach and family training (CRAFT) model, which uses self-management and shaping techniques.

By most evaluations, its procedures produce one of the largest effect sizes out of all mental health and educational interventions.

== Token economies ==
One form of contingency management is the token economy system. Token systems can be used in an individual or group format. Token systems are successful with a diverse array of populations including those suffering from addiction, those with special needs, and those experiencing delinquency. However, recent research questions the use of token systems with very young children. The exception to the last would be the treatment of stuttering. The goal of such systems is to gradually thin out and to help the person begin to access the natural community of reinforcement (the reinforcement typically received in the world for performing the behavior).

Walker (1990) presents an overview of token systems and combining such procedures with other interventions in the classroom. He relates the comprehensiveness of token systems to the child's level of difficulty.

== Voucher programs and related applications in addiction treatment ==
Another form of contingency management is voucher programs. In voucher-based contingency management patients earn vouchers exchangeable for retail items contingent upon objectively verified abstinence from recent drug use or compliance with other behavior-change targets. This particular form of contingency management was introduced in the early 1990s as a treatment for cocaine dependence. The approach is the most reliably effective method for producing cocaine abstinence in controlled clinical trials.

Medication take-home privileges is another form of contingency management frequently used in methadone maintenance treatment. Patients are permitted to "earn" take-home doses of their methadone in exchange for increasing, decreasing, or ceasing certain behaviors. For example, a patient may be given one take-home dose per week after submitting negative drug screens (generally via urine testing) for three months. (Take-home-doses (or "bottles") are seen as desirable rewards because they allow patients to come to the clinic less often to obtain their medication).

Based on applied behavior analysis (ABA), contingency management includes techniques such as choice and preference assessments, shaping, making contracts between the therapist and patient, community reinforcement approach and family training, and token economy.

Contingent vouchers are also used to cease smoking addictions. One study claims that people with substance use disorders can receive help with their addiction through the use of voucher-based treatment for smoking. In addition, nicotine replacement (NRT) can help with addiction combined with the vouchers.

=== Effectiveness in addiction programs ===
A meta-analysis of contingency management in drug programs showed that it has a large effect. These contingencies are delivered based on abstinence and attendance goals and can take the form of vouchers, the opportunity to win prizes or privileges. They have been used with single problem addictions as well as dual diagnoses and homelessness. Overall contingency management is an effective and cost-efficient addition to drug treatment.

In contrast to these findings in a recent study, the researchers found out that nicotine replacement treatment only improved the effects of contingent vouchers on short-term smoking abstinence. However, in the long term, the effects of contingent vouchers had no impact on tobacco resistance.

== Level systems ==
Level systems are often employed as a form of contingency management system. Level systems are designed such that once one level is achieved, then the person earns all the privileges for that level and the levels lower than it.

== See also ==
- Applied behavior analysis
- Behaviorism
- Behavior management
- Behavior modification
- Community reinforcement approach and family training
- Contingency contract
- Experimental analysis of behavior
- Operant conditioning
- Professional practice of behavior analysis
- Radical behaviorism
- Reinforcement
- Three-term contingency
- Token economy
