= Theoretical behaviorism =

Psychological framework likening behaviorism to evolution

Theoretical behaviorism is a framework for psychology proposed by J. E. R. Staddon as an extension of experimental psychologist B. F. Skinner's radical behaviorism. It originated at Harvard in the early 1960s.

In the late 1980s, R. H. Ettinger and Staddon critiqued functional analysis.

== Application of selection and variation to behaviorism ==
In the early 1950s, B. F. Skinner and others began to point out the similarities between the learning process and evolution through variation and selection. More recently, models explicitly analogous to gene mutation and selection by reinforcement have been applied to operant conditioning phenomena. Skinner’s idea of "emitted behavior" is an example of a parallel between evolution and behaviorism: once a behavior varies, a variant that results in reward is strengthened and therefore increases in frequency. When a reward is taken away or when selection is relaxed, there is an increase in variability in both natural selection and selection by reinforcement schedule.

Skinner said little about the causes and types of behavior variation, believing it to be random. On the other hand, Zener, Liddell and others argue that the variation in behaviors that psychological reinforcement acts on is not random. For example, it is different for food than for sex or a social reward. The ethologist Lorenz first identified the dog’s behavior as a particular instinctive pattern, similar to a repertoire.

== Repertoire of possible behaviors ==
A "repertoire" of behaviors involves potential behaviors that may occur under certain conditions, such as if the currently active behavior is unrewarded. The observed repertoire in a particular animal depends on the reward size and nature of the stimulus: anticipation of food will lead to a different repertoire than anticipation of electric shock.

In addition to the active behavior, a repertoire includes latent possible activities. This idea of a latent response was first suggested by B.F. Skinner:

"Our basic datum…is the probability that a response will be emitted…We recognize …that … every response may be conceived of as having at any moment an assignable probability of emission... A latent response with a certain probability of emission is not directly observed. It is a scientific construct. But it can be given a respectable status, and it enormously increases our analytical power…. It is assumed that the strength of a response must reach a certain value before the response will be emitted. This value is called the threshold."

Within theoretical behaviorism, the "threshold" is instead competition from other possible responses.
