= Three-term contingency =

Contingency in operant conditioning

The three-term contingency (also known as the ABC contingency) is a psychological model describing operant conditioning in three terms consisting of a behavior, its consequence, and the environmental context, as applied in contingency management. The three-term contingency was first defined by B. F. Skinner in the early 1950s. It is often used within ABA to alter the frequency of socially significant human behavior.

== Components ==
=== Antecedent ===
The antecedent stimulus occurs first in the contingency and signals that reinforcement or punishment is available on the contingency of a specific behavior. A discriminative stimulus, or S^{D}, directly affects the likelihood of a specific response occurring.

=== Behavior ===
The behavior, also referred to as the response, is any observable and measurable action a living organism can do. In the three-term contingency, behavior is operant, meaning it changes the environment in some way.

=== Consequence ===
Diagram of consequences in operant conditioning

The consequence of a behavior can be reinforcing or punishing. Reinforcing consequences increase the likelihood of a behavior occurring in the future; it is further divided into positive and negative reinforcement. Punishing consequences decrease the likelihood of a behavior occurring in the future; like reinforcement, it is divided into positive and negative punishment. An example of punishment may include beatings (positive punishment), and taking away something desired or loved (negative punishment).

The effectiveness and value of a consequence are determined by the motivating operations the organism has. For example, deprivation of food can make food more effective as a consequence, and the satiation of hunger can make food less effective as a consequence.
