= Organizational behavior management =

Subdiscipline of applied behavior analysis

Organizational behavior management (OBM) is a subdiscipline of applied behavior analysis (ABA), which is the application of behavior analytic principles and contingency management techniques to change behavior in organizational settings. Through these principles and assessment of behavior, OBM seeks to analyze and employ antecedent, influencing actions of an individual before the action occurs, and consequence, what happens as a result of someone's actions, interventions which influence behaviors linked to the mission and key objectives of the organization and its workers. Such interventions have proven effective through research in improving common organizational areas including employee productivity, delivery of feedback, safety, and overall morale of said organization.

== History ==
OBM is a subdiscipline of ABA, thus its emergence stems from the foundations of behavior analysis developed by B.F. Skinner. Skinner's book Science and Human Behavior, published in 1953, served as the foundation for OBM by highlighting the use of money to increase desired behaviors, wage schedules, and higher levels of praise for desired behaviors as opposed to undesired behaviors. Skinner's greatest contributions to the emergence of OBM however was introducing programmed instruction to the educational system. Aspects of programmed instruction proved beneficial in organizational settings, particularly training. This later became the first application of behavioral principles in the organizational settings.

Emergence of research in OBM sparked in the 1960s with publication of Owen Aldis’ paper "Of Pigeons and Men" in which he proposes using reinforcement schedules in industries as the first OBM article published in the 1961 Harvard Business Review.

=== Journal of Organizational Behavior Management ===
Founded in 1977, the Journal of Organizational Behavior Management (JOBM) served as a milestone in the field of Organizational Behavior Management. With Aubrey Daniels as editor and Larry Miller as manager editor, the first board of editors for JOBM was composed of twenty-five individuals. Various names were used to describe the application of behavioral principles in organizational settings but the birth of JOBM solidified the use of the term Organizational Behavior Management to describe such applications in such settings.

JOBM is periodical journal which seeks to publish research and review articles which apply principles of ABA to improve organizations through behavior change. Areas addressed throughout JOBM include performance measurement, performance level interventions, goal setting, feedback, incentive programs, and evidence-based management. In 2003, the ISI Impact Factor of JOBM was ranked third in the Journal Citation Reports ranking of journals in applied psychology further establishing JOBM as a high-quality journal.

=== History of educational advancements in OBM ===
An early program in OBM was initiated at the University of Notre Dame in 1975 with the arrival of Martin Wikoff, the first graduate student in the program. Prior to attending Notre Dame, Wikoff, with University of Washington professors, Bob Kohlenberg (Psychology) and Terrance Mitchell (Foster School of Business) conducted one of the first controlled studies of applied behavior analysis in business; in this case, to improve grocery clerk performance.

== Interventions in OBM ==
Antecedents in OBM are simply defined as triggers that evoke behavior by presenting something in the workers environment that will increase the likelihood the behavior will occur. These interventions can be used to address an array of behaviors which ultimately benefit the organization and workers of the organization. The intervention used is determined by the behavior being targeted and whether or not the organization has a desire for the behavior to be exhibited in the work setting or not.

More commonly used antecedent interventions involve combining task clarification, job aids, and goal setting. Task clarification interventions are used and designed to provide specific job requirements for employees by clarifying and prompting employee behavior. Previous studies which implement task clarification involve using items such as memos and checklists to ensure tasks are completed. Job aids interventions involve prompts, or addition of items in the work environment such as signs, remind workers whether or not a behavior should occur. When combined, goal setting can then be introduced to establish a standard to how well workers must perform within a given time frame. While the use of antecedent interventions one of the most common strategies, the strategies set the occasion for behavior, but do not maintain them. That aspect of OBM falls to consequence interventions.

=== Consequence interventions ===
Consequence is defined as a change in the environment that follow a worker's behavior which increases the likelihood the behavior will continue to be exhibited in the future.

In OBM, feedback is a common and successful intervention method used in organizational settings. A study in 2012 found that feedback was the research of interest in over 70% of studies published in JOBM. This is due to the various types of feedback delivery which can be tailored to the organization and its goals in addition to having numerous research articles which provide empirical evidence of its effectiveness. Such types include feedback on individual performance, group performance, previous individual performance, previous group performance, and different group's performance.

Regardless of which consequence intervention used, an important element of the OBM intervention involves using one of the principles of ABA known as reinforcement. This is due to the fact that when a behavior is reinforced, it is likely to continue to be exhibited in similar conditions to which the behavior was reinforced.

=== Benefits of OBM ===
Increase Productivity: Organizations can frequently increase productivity levels by focusing on performance indicators and applying behavioral science using clear, specific, and measurable goals combined with ongoing feedback.

Enhance Employee well-being: OBM's long-term objective is to establish the circumstances required to uphold expected behavioral in the absence of intervention managers. With clear goals and routinely self-esteem behavior, it positively impacts on staff performance, satisfactory and happiness. Therefore, organizations that prioritize employee well-being using tactics such as flexible scheduling, emotional support, and stress management resources can help reduce burnout and improve productivity.

Reduce Costs: OBM techniques can find process inefficiencies, such as task analysis and time-and-motion studies. Organizations can finish jobs more quickly and with fewer resources by streamlining these procedures, which lowers costs. In addition, effective OBM practices can also help manage and reduce absenteeism. This has the dual benefit of reducing costs related to short-staffing and overtime payments. Moreover, due to OBM practices improve employees well-being, it highly likely that it reduces turnover, which is costly, not involving recruitment, training and maintains productivity, thereby reducing these associated costs.

Data-Driven Decisions: Using data allows for a precise understanding of what is working and what is not, enabling targeted interventions and allocating resources effectively. In addition, Quantifiable metrics allow for increased accountability for both employees and management. It can also improve transparency when decisions are based on data and can be perceived as more fair than decisions based on subjective judgment.

=== Challenges of OBM ===
==== Ethical concerns ====
Ethical issues frequently center on the application of behavioral principles in a way that can be perceived as forceful or manipulative. The profession frequently emphasizes the necessity of ethical norms and behavior analyst certification in ensuring that OBM practices are both effective and ethical.

==== Need for continuous data collection ====
OBM largely depends on data-driven decisions, which necessitates regular data gathering, which can be resource-intensive. Prior to implementing any interventions, data must be collected to establish a baseline for performance measures, which will aid in determining the effectiveness of OBM activities. Continuous data allows organizations to examine if actions are achieving the expected outcomes in real time. This allows for timely intervention modifications. Moreover, ongoing data collection enables employees to receive rapid and accurate feedback, which is a powerful motivator for performance development.

=== Areas of application ===
Organizational behavior management has expanded, establishing specialty areas such as performance management, systems analysis, and behavior-based safety, which are now widely recognized.

==== Performance management ====
Performance management (PM) is the implementation of behavioral principles to manage the performance of individual employees or a group of employees. It focuses on improving individual and organizational performance. OBM specialists in this area design and implement strategies to enhance employee productivity, efficiency, and effectiveness. In performance management, managers assess and monitor employee behaviors via tools like performance reviews and feedback to ensure employees have the information they need to do an effective job and receive recognition for good performance.

OBM performance assessments have several uses. Practitioners utilize assessments to identify performance issues, identify environmental factors causing performance issues, and select functionally appropriate interventions.

==== Behavioral systems analysis ====
Behavioral systems analysis (BSA) is a comprehensive OBM method that examines the entire organizational system to identify areas for improvement, focusing on planning and managing variables that support desired performance and examining how components interact.

The BSA approach involves a systematic analysis and improvement process across multiple performance levels, ensuring system changes are made based on understanding their impact and assessing the variables affecting performance.

Moreover, BSA views organizations as adaptive and interconnected systems. An adaptive system allows performers to quickly and effectively respond to changes in internal and external environments, while an interconnected system ensures that changes affect other parts.

The three-level approach is the most commonly used multi-level framework in BSA. It breaks down organizations into three levels of analysis to give a clear picture of how a business runs.

1. Organizational level. This level emphasizes the importance of viewing organizations as adaptive systems, establishing goals based on values and customer requirements, and communicating these goals to all stakeholders.
2. Process level. The process level offers the most significant opportunities for performance improvement, as it connects goals, design, and management at the organization and job/performer levels.
3. Job/performer level. This level focuses on the individuals and their roles inside the organization. For instance, examining job design behaviors, and consequences of individuals working within the system.

==== Behavior-based safety ====
Behavioral-based safety (BBS) is an OBM approach to reduce workplace accidents and promote a safe work environment. It aims to evaluate work environments and implement safety measures, teaching employees and teams to perform their roles safely rather than solely relying on equipment.

The primary focus in safety is to eliminate occupational hazards from the work environment, followed by substitution and engineering controls. Behavioral processes would be best categorized as administrative controls that can promote safety priority and protective behaviors at all levels of an organization.

Effective BBS applications frequently follow the seven basic principles by Geller as following:

1. Focus intervention on observable behavior. BBS focuses on what individuals do, examines why they do it, and then employs an intervention technique validated by research to change what people do.
2. Identification of external factors. Identifying environmental conditions influencing behavior is cost-effective, especially when necessary, such as inadequate management systems or behaviors promoting at-risk work practices. BBS principles are necessary for these inadequacies to be noticed.
3. Motivation to behave in the desired manner. The BBS approach applies the Activator, Behavior, Consequence (ABC) principle to design interventions for improving individual, group, and organizational behavior. Over 40 years of research have demonstrated its efficacy in directing and motivating behavior change.
4. Focus on the positive consequences of appropriate behavior. Research has shown that individuals with a high need to avoid failure are likelier to set challenging but attainable goals. In contrast, those with a high need for success are likelier to set unrealistic goals.
5. Application of the scientific method. Systematic and scientific observation enables objective feedback to know what works and does not work to improve behavior.
6. Integration of information, not to limit possibilities. Research-based theory develops effective interventions based on situational or interpersonal characteristics, integrating information from systematic behavioral observations.
7. Planned interventions that take internal feelings and attitudes into account. Intervention implementation and refinement decisions should be based on objective behavioral observations and subjective evaluations of feeling states. The indirect internal impact can be evaluated by imagining oneself going through the intervention procedures

== Management ==
=== Scientific management ===
OBM might be seen as one of the distant branches of scientific management, originally inspired by Taylor. The principal difference between scientific management and OBM might be on the conceptual underpinnings: OBM is based on B.F. Skinner's science of human behavior. Because different people behave differently in the same situation, studies from multiple disciplines using multiple research methods create confusion, hindering a unified concept of organizational behavior.

=== Quality management ===
The parallel between OBM tools and the process and procedures common to the so-called Quality Movement (SPC, Deming, Quality Circles, ISO, etc.) was documented by Wikoff in his ISPI Article of the Year, the quality movement meets performance technology.

== Relationship with industrial and organizational psychology ==
While OBM and industrial and organizational (IO) psychology both take place in organizational setting, the two areas differ in ways such as theoretical basis, areas of interest/research, research methods, and publication of research.

IO is seen as its own field and is described as the scientific study of working and applying the science to the workplace to address issues of relevance on the individual and organizational level, many of which use on self-report. OBM is seen as a subdiscipline of ABA thus deriving the principles from the field as opposed to IO. While the areas of interest for both fields work to improve organizations, IO psychology primary areas of interest are among worker personnel selection and placement, cognitive processes, attitudes, and leadership qualities. OBM areas of interest focus on observable behavior such as goal setting, feedback, job aids, improving safe behaviors in the workforce.

Research in IO psychology primarily consist of between-group statistical designs and analyses while using surveys and laboratory simulations. OBM research primarily practices within-subject research methods and designs with visual inspection of research through graphs. Research in IO psychology is published through the Society for Industrial Organizational Psychology (SIOP) while research in OBM is published in the JOBM.
