= Nathan Azrin =

American psychologist (1930–2013)

Nathan H. Azrin
- Born: November 26, 1930; Boston, MA
- Died: March 29, 2013 (aged 82); Pompano Beach, Florida
- Education: PhD
- Alma mater: Boston University
- Occupations: Psychologist, researcher, professor
- Known for: Token Economics, the Community Reinforcement Approach (CRA), Family Behavior Therapy, and habit reversal training
- Notable work: Toilet Training in Less Than a Day
- Spouse: Victoria Besalel Azrin
- Parent(s): Harold and Esther Azrin
- Awards: Distinguished Contribution for Applications in Psychology Award – American Psychological Association; James McKeen Cattell Fellow Award – Association of Psychological Sciences; Lifetime Achievement Award – Association of Behavioral and Cognitive Therapies

Nathan H. Azrin (November 26, 1930 – March 29, 2013) was a behavioral modification researcher, psychologist, and university professor. He taught at Southern Illinois University and was the research director of Anna State Hospital between 1958 and 1980. In 1980 he became a professor at Nova Southeastern University, and entered emeritus status at the university in 2010.

Azrin was the founder of several research methodologies, including Token Economics, the Community Reinforcement Approach (CRA) on which the CRAFT model was based, Family Behavior Therapy, and habit reversal training. According to fellow psychologist Brian Iwata: “Few people have made research contributions equaling Nate’s in either basic or applied behaviour analysis, and none have matched his contributions to both endeavors.”

== Early life ==
Nathan Azrin was born on November 26, 1930, in Boston, Massachusetts, to parents Harold and Esther. His parents owned and operated a small local grocery store, where Azrin and his siblings worked. Azrin graduated from Boston University in 1951 with a BA and in 1952 with his MA, both in psychology. In 1955 Azrin received his PhD in Psychology under the supervision of BF Skinner from Harvard University.

== Career ==
After he completed his PhD, Azrin did two postdoctoral years as a research psychologist, first at the Institute of Living, with Karl H. Pribram, and then with the US Army Ordinance studying human factors in fatigue. He was then named a professor at Southern Illinois University and research director in the Illinois Department of Mental Health. Between 1958 and 1980, he was the research director at Anna State Hospital. He also spent one year in 1976–1977 on sabbatical as a fellow at the Center for Advanced Study in the Behavioral Sciences, in Palo Alto, California. Between 1980 and 2010 served as clinical director, between 1981 and 1986 worked as a professor at Nova Southeastern University. In 2010, he became emeritus professor at the university.

Azrin was also a co-founder and president of the Midwestern Association for Behavior Analysis, and was president of the Association for Behavior Analysis International. He was a president of the Association for Behavioral and Cognitive Therapies, the Association for Advancement of Behavior Therapy, and the Florida Association for Behavior Analysis. Azrin is known as one of the founders of the behavior modification school of thought and Applied Behavior Analysis.

== Personal life and death ==
Nathan Azrin died on March 29, 2013, in Pompano Beach, Florida. Azrin had been battling cancer since 2007. He was survived by his wife Victoria Besalel Azrin and four children.

== Research ==
=== Token economics ===
At Anna State Hospital, one of his first initiatives was to try to reverse behaviors that patients had developed after years in psychiatric institutions, such as mutism or a lack of motivation to change from a hospital gown into regular clothes. In order to do this, Azrin together with Teodoro Ayllon developed a bartering system he called "token economics", which gave incentives to patients to make behavioral changes, such as putting on their clothes each day. The system was created based upon the work of Azrin's mentor BF Skinner's examining the behavior of lab rats. The two behaviors Azrin sought to improve in patients were self-care activities (such as dressing or grooming) and job activities (such as washing dishes), specifically in adult female psychotic clients. In practice, Azrin provided plastic tokens to patients as a reward for certain behaviors, tokens that could be used for "gifts" such as entering the television room or operating the television itself. An increase in the number of tokens provided was given for those that put the most care into their behavior. In 1968 Azrin and Teodoro Ayllon authored the book The Token Economy summarizing their work and findings.

=== Addictions studies ===
In the 1970s he worked with Mark Godley and George Hunt on the development of the Community Reinforcement Approach (CRA), applying behavioral therapy to the treatment of alcoholism. After the death of Hunt, Azrin performed the first outpatient treatment trial and first inpatient trial using the principles of CRA. His work also first introduced an abstinence-based goal to CRA, instead of the controlled drinking goal that was being used by other researchers. The goal of CRA was to gradually change drinking-rewarded behaviors to non-drinking rewarded behaviors, including the changing of social networks and transitioning leisure environments. Later studies by Azrin also began to integrate medication-based help into the methodology. Part of his research included the formation of "job clubs" as a method of alleviating unemployment problems, providing social support for them to enter the workforce in a way that the individual finds reward in the work they find, in addition to a daily structure of job-searching that replaces previous daily behavior.

Azrin also developed Family Behavior Therapy (FBT) for dealing with juvenile misbehavior and narcotics use, after receiving a 1989 grant from the National Institute on Drug Abuse and National Institute of Mental Health. The research considers how the behavior of family members can indirectly or purposely reinforce an adolescent's behavior. Any indirect reinforcement is controlled by ensuring all members of a client's family are present for therapy sessions, so that there is a group effort towards behavioral change. Therapy methods included contingency management, communication skills surrounding drug use, problem solving, and efforts to improve family relationships. He co-authored the book Treating Adolescent Substance Abuse Using Family Behavior Therapy: A Step-by-Step Approach with Brad Donohue, aimed at providing a model for clinicians to employ with clients, based on his research. Azrin has also done research on cigarette smoking addictions.

=== Parenting work ===
In addition to academic works, in 1974 Azrin co-authored the parenting book Toilet Training in Less Than a Day with Richard M. Foxx, which sold more than three million copies and is available in several dozen languages. In one study, the technique in the book was shown to result in a 97% decrease in bathroom accidents during the week after training, following an average of 3.9 hours of "dry-pants training". Other tests showed the success rate was closer to 74%.

Azrin is also developed his "time out" parenting technique as an alternative to corporal punishment. Azrin and Foxx's technique has drawn a considerable amount of controversy, with critics saying it is overly harsh, and psychologist Dr Eda Leshan stating that “Although one is supposed to be kind and patient, it’s all done by forcing fluids (with things like salty potato chips and orange soda) and conditioned reflexes, leaving out such minor considerations as fears and fantasies, love-hate feelings, dependency and rebellion — the whole unconscious, which we have been struggling so hard to understand. It is an immoral book.”

=== Other research ===
Azrin developed the concepts of "shaping" and "successive approximation" in his work with disordered people; Psychology Today called Azrin one of the foundational "behavior shapers" and credited him with adapting the work of Skinner from lab animals into the human realm. These collectively used operant conditioning principles to introduce complex behavior to the developmentally challenged. His research also included lab animal tests, such as incentivizing experiments with pigeons that produced the result that they are more likely to form a behavior if there is some reward involved rather than punishment. Azrin was also involved in early research into autism during the early 1960s as a post-doctoral researcher, as well as later in his career.

Azrin researched the concept of behavior reversal training, also known as habit reversal, in order to treat patients with uncontrollable physical tics, trichotillomania, and other repetitive behavior disorders like stuttering or Tourette syndrome. In 1977, he published Habit Control: Stuttering, Nail Biting, and Other Nervous Habits, which summarized his research, co-authored with Richard Nunn. In the 1970s, Azrin was involved in the government review of BF Skinner's Special Treatment and Rehabilitative Training research program at the Federal Medical Center for Prisoners in Missouri. He was named as one of three expert witnesses to review the program and findings, and defended the program as in line with the principles of behavioral psychology. Further research of Azrin's include his development of the reciprocity counseling program for marriage counseling, and the concept of "overcorrection", which uses positive punishment to correct undesired behaviors and foster desired behaviors.

In 1975 Azrin published research that led to his establishing a system for unemployed persons to assist each other in job finding. One insight from his research with his colleagues was that people on welfare or with disabilities do not possess the family and friends networks that others have to help them with finding jobs. Azrin created The Job Club Counselor's Manual (1981) which showed how to employ a system utilizing a small group of people who assisted each other in their job search by having the leader provide job search information and using positive behavioral leadership by recording member's positive actions such as number of employer contacts made, applications submitted, and interviews obtained. Participants take ownership of the quest as they share information and encourage each other. Azrin's successful job club concept soon spread throughout North America and continues to help people with obtaining employment.

Azrin served on the editorial boards of seventeen peer-reviewed journals, including the Journal of Applied Behavior Analysis, which he founded. He was also the Editor-in-Chief of the Journal of the Experimental Analysis of Behavior and a contributor to the Encyclopedia of Behavior Modification and Cognitive Behavior Therapy. As an author he published more than 100 behavioral studies in additional peer-reviewed publications, and eleven books. Azrin's work made him one of the most cited behavioral scientists in the world.

=== Books ===
- The Token Economy: A Motivational System for Therapy and Rehabilitation (1968)
- Toilet Training the Retarded: A Rapid Program for Day and Nighttime Independent Toileting (1973)
- Toilet Training in Less Than A Day (1974)
- Habit Control in a Day: The Breakthrough Book that Describes Professionally Tested New Methods for Eliminating Stuttering, Nail Biting, Hair Pulling, Muscular Tics, and Other Nervous Habits (1977)
- Habit Control in a Day: Stuttering, Nail Biting, and Other Nervous Habits (1978)
- A Parent's Guide to Bedwetting Control (1979)
- Job Club Counselor's Manual: A Behavioral Approach to Vocational Counseling (1980)
- How to Use Overcorrection: For Misbehaviors and Errors (1980)
- How to Use Positive Practice (1981)
- A Parent's Guide to Bedwetting Control: A Step by Step Method (1980)
- Finding a Job (1982)
- How to Use Positive Practice, Self-correction, and Overcorrection (1999)
- Treating Adolescent Substance Abuse Using Family Behavior Therapy: A Step-by-Step Approach (2011)

== Recognition ==
In 1975, Azrin was awarded the Distinguished Contribution for Applications in Psychology Award by the American Psychological Association. In 1992 Azrin received the James McKeen Cattell Fellow Award from the Association of Psychological Sciences. In 1997 Azrin received the lifetime achievement award from the Association of Behavioral and Cognitive Therapies. In 2011 he was awarded the Lifetime Achievement Award for Research Contributions That Have Bettered Humanity from Nova Southeastern University. He is also the namesake of the Nathan H. Azrin Distinguished Contribution to Applied Behavior Analysis Award given annually by the American Psychological Association.
