= Token economy =

Contingency management based on the systematic reinforcement of target behavior

- ICD-9-CM: 94.33

A token economy is a system of contingency management based on the systematic reinforcement of target behavior. The reinforcers are symbols or tokens that can be exchanged for other reinforcers. A token economy is based on the principles of operant conditioning and behavioral economics and can be situated within applied behavior analysis. In applied settings token economies are used with children and adults; however, they have been successfully modeled with pigeons in lab settings.

== Basic requirements ==
Three requirements are basic for a token economy: tokens, back-up reinforcers, and specified target behaviours.

=== Tokens ===
Tokens must be used as reinforcers to be effective. A token is an object or symbol that can be exchanged for material reinforcers, services, or privileges (back-up reinforcers). In applied settings, a wide range of tokens have been used: coins, checkmarks, images of small suns or stars, points on a counter, and checkmarks on a poster. These symbols and objects are comparably worthless outside of the patient–clinician or teacher–student relationship, but their value lies in the fact that they can be exchanged for other things. Technically speaking, tokens are not primary reinforcers, but secondary or learned reinforcers. Much research has been conducted on token reinforcement, including animal studies.

=== Back-up reinforcers ===
Tokens have no intrinsic value, but can be exchanged for other valued reinforcing events: back-up reinforcers, which act as rewards. Most token economies offer a choice of differing back-up reinforcers that can be virtually anything. Some possible reinforcers might be:

- Material reinforcers: candy, cigarettes, journals, money
- Services: breakfast in bed, room cleaned, enjoyable activities
- Privileges and other extras: passes for leaving a building or area, permission to stay in bed, break from work-related tasks, phone calls, having one's name or picture on a wall, access to TV, videos or video games.

Back-up reinforcers are chosen in function of the individual or group for which the token economy is set up, or depending upon the possibilities available to the staff. Prior to starting the staff decides how many tokens have to be paid for each back-up reinforcer. Often, price lists are exposed or given to the clients. Some back-up reinforcers can be bought anytime, for other exchange times are limited (e.g. opening times of a token shop).

=== Specified target behaviors ===
There is a broad range of possible target behaviors: doing self-care such as washing, attending scheduled activities, having good academic behavior, or avoiding disruptive behavior. A token economy is more than just using exchangeable tokens. For a token economy to work, criteria have to be specified and clear. A staff member giving tokens to a client just because they judge them to be behaving positively is not part of a token economy because it is not done in a systematic way. Sometimes client manuals have specifications how many tokens can be earned by each target behavior. For instance, if making the bed is a target behavior, staff and clients have to know how a well-made bed looks like. However, often these specifications are hard to make: behavior such as eating politely and positive cooperation are hard to specify. While planning how many tokens can be earned by each target behavior some factors have to be considered: on the one hand clients should be able to earn a minimal amount of tokens for a minimal effort, and on the other hand clients should not earn too much too soon, making more effort useless.

Sometimes the possibility of punishment by token loss is included, technically called response cost: disruptive behavior can be fined with the loss of tokens. This is also clearly specified before the application starts. Clients can be involved in the specifying of the contingencies.

== Other features ==
Besides the three basic requirements, other features are often present: social reinforcement, shaping, immediacy of reinforcement, forward planning, and consistency.

=== Social reinforcement ===
Token reinforcement is always accompanied by social reinforcement. Tokens are intended to make reinforcement explicit and immediate, and to strengthen behavior, but in the end social reinforcement should be sufficient to maintain what's been learned.

=== Shaping ===
Shaping implies clients aren't expected to do everything perfectly at once; behavior can be acquired in steps. Initially clients can be reinforced for behavior that approaches the target. If the target behavior is keeping attention during a 30-minute session, clients can initially already get (perhaps smaller) reinforcement for five minutes of attention.

=== Immediacy of reinforcement ===
Reinforcement is more likely to influence behavior if given shortly after the response is emitted. The longer people have to wait for a reward, the less effect and the less they will learn. This is the principle of delay discounting. Immediate token reinforcement can bridge later reinforcement.

=== Saving ===
Sometimes clients can earn larger rewards like the permission to spend a weekend at home, going to a movie, or having a class excursion. When such rewards would be given at once for one instance of a target behavior, the scarce resources would soon be depleted and consequently the incentives would be lost. One advantage of tokens is they can be used to divide larger rewards into parts: clients can save tokens to buy more expensive rewards later. This implies they shouldn't immediately spend all earned tokens on attractive smaller rewards, and instead learn to plan ahead. This way they can acquire self-control. (See Delayed gratification.)

=== Individual and group contingencies ===
Many token economies are designed for groups. The system is running for a whole ward or class. Within this group contingency specific individual goals and reinforcers can be added, though sometimes a token economy is designed for only one specific individual.

=== Consistent application ===
The power of a token economy largely depends on the consistency of its application. To achieve this thorough staff training is essential. Some token economies failed exactly on this point. Token economies imply rights and duties for clients as well as for staff. When, according to the system, a client deserves tokens, he or she should get them, even when a staff member judges he or she doesn't deserve them because he has been impolite the day before. Family education and involvement is also an aspect. They can support the system or they can undermine it, for instance by secretly giving undeserved rewards.

== History ==
In the early 19th century, long before there was any knowledge about operant learning, there were some precursors of token economies in schools and prisons. In those systems points could be earned and exchanged for many different items and privileges. Only in the 1960s the first real token economies arose in psychiatric hospitals. Teodoro Ayllon, Nathan Azrin and Leonard Krasner were important pioneers in these early years. The very first token economy bearing that name was founded by Ayllon and Azrin in 1961 at Anna State Hospital in Illinois. In the 1970s the token economies came to a peak and became widespread. In 1977 a major study (a randomized controlled trial), still considered a landmark, was published. This study showed the superiority of a token economy compared to standard treatment and specialized milieu therapy. Despite this success token economies declined from the 1980s on.

== Controversy ==
The application of token economies, especially with adults, became a matter of criticism. In addition some impediments and the evolution of mental health care caused troubles. Token economies have proven their effectiveness and utility for chronic psychiatric patients, despite requiring months or even years to achieve optimal results. This causes problems when insurance and government policies increasingly require the shortest possible hospital stays. Because emphasis has shifted to community-based treatment, outpatient and home-based care is often the preferred choice over institutionalization. This decentralization of patient care methods makes it difficult to further study and develop token economies in a scientific, research-oriented method.

Token economies can present issues with concern to patient rights. The right to have their personal properties, basic comfort and freedom of choice of treatment constrains the possibilities for token economies. In addition, ethical and personal concerns of staff members arose, such as the ethics of using certain reinforcers, the ethics of operant conditioning itself, a lack of sincerity, and an emphasis on material goods. Application of a token economy to adults sometimes triggers client resistance.

Problems with maintaining what's been learned and the generalization toward new situations have also been signaled. When the token programs stops the acquired behavior might disappear again. Rewarding behavior could increase the extrinsic motivation and at the same time decrease the intrinsic motivation for activities.

== Applications and findings ==
In the last 50 years much research has been conducted on token economy. Despite controversy and a lack of implementation token programs still exist in several settings.

=== Adults ===
In adult settings token economies are mostly applied in mental health care. When offered a choice, the vast majority of clients in past studies voluntarily chose to stay in the program. Research shows the effects of token economies can more or less be divided into three categories:

- No effect: 5 to 20% of the clients do not (or minimally) respond to the token economy;
- Only effect while the token economy is active and no effect once stopped: in this case the token economy is functioning as a prosthesis (like a wheelchair); it does not permanently help the patient once terminated but is necessary to maintain normal functioning;
- Well established long-term effects (including community reintegration).

==== Schizophrenia ====
The first token economies were designed for chronic, treatment-resistant psychotic inpatients. Even now token economies are applied to clients with schizophrenia, who are often resistant to common behavioral treatment approaches. Sometimes the token economy is used as a lasting prosthesis. Sometimes it's used to help such clients reach resocialization. A token economy, in combination with other interventions, succeeded in the community reintegration of 78% of the clients within an average period of 110 days, after more than seven years of uninterrupted hospital stay. Research shows clients experience the token economy with positive reception. Several recent reviews of psychosocial treatment for schizophrenia explicitly mention token economy as an effective, evidence-based treatment and one systematic review specifically examined token economy. The token economy approach may have effects on symptoms such as apathy and poverty of thought, but it is unclear if these results are reproducible, clinically meaningful and are maintained beyond the treatment programme.

==== Acute units ====
The application of token economies has been extended from psychiatric rehabilitation services to acute psychiatric units. A token economy was successful in decreasing the aggression on a ward where clients on average stayed for less than three weeks.

==== Substance abuse ====
As a result of ethical criticism, token economies developed a negative stigma and, as a result, systems were sometimes introduced with aliases. This was especially the case in substance abuse treatment settings (although some systems for smoking cessation continue to use the term token economy). For some time, systems derived from token economies were used under the name contingency management; initially this was more broadly defined and referred to any direct coupling of consequences (reinforcements or punishments) with behavior (for example staying clean); later it referred specifically to one kind of token economy.

The community reinforcement approach can be combined with contingency management; tokens are used, whereas contingency management employs the term voucher (or related terms). Research shows this kind of token economy is easily applied outside of hospitals and is effective, allowing for less hospital-based treatment – although contingency management is used in the treatment of drug abuse in both inpatient and outpatient settings.

==== Developmental disorders ====
Token economy has also been applied in settings for adults with developmental disabilities. Target behaviors can vary in types of social behavior and self care, or the decreasing of inappropriate and/or disruptive behavior.

=== Children and adolescents ===
Token economies have been applied to children and adolescents with developmental disabilities as well as in schools.

==== Developmental disabilities ====
A token economy has proven effective in increasing attentiveness and motivation in completion of tasks for children with developmental disabilities. Research shows it can help to diminish disruptive behavior and promote social behavior.

==== Schools ====
Token economies have been applied in schools, particularly special education programs as well as in other programs. Positive results can imply increased attention and decreased disruptive behavior. In educational settings token economy seems to raise the intrinsic motivation to complete assigned tasks. A 2011 systematic evaluation found that token economies are generally effective in reducing problem behavior among students with challenging behavior, while noting variation in implementation and study design.

== See also ==
- Experimental analysis of behavior
- Operant conditioning
- Reinforcement
- Tokenomics
- Money
