= Aubrey Daniels =

American clinical psychologist

- Born: May 17, 1935; Lake City, SC
- Died: March 1, 2025 (aged 89); Atlanta, GA
- Citizenship: United States
- Education: Furman University
- Known for: Behavioral science, performance management
- Spouse: Rebecca
- Children: 2

Aubrey Clise Daniels (May 17, 1935 - March 1, 2025) was an American behavioral scientist and the founder and chairman of the board for Aubrey Daniels International (ADI), a performance management consulting company.

== Background and career ==
Born on May 17, 1935, in Lake City, South Carolina, he attended Lake City High School and graduated from Furman University in 1957 with a B.A. in Psychology & Speech. While at Furman, he sang with The Furman Singers, where he met and subsequently married Rebecca Tapp, a soloist from Greer, South Carolina. The two married in 1953. Having also enlisted in the military around this time, one month after his wedding to Rebecca, Aubrey was deployed to the Korean Demilitarized Zone as a lieutenant in the US Army immediately following the end of open conflict in the Korean War.

He attended the University of Florida where he earned his M.A. and Ph.D. in Psychology and Philosophy (Phi Beta Kappa), and became a devotee of the renowned behavioral psychologist, B.F. Skinner. He quickly became convinced that the work of Skinner and other behavioral scientists best enabled his patients to change their own behaviors. It was then that he made the connection that the science could be successfully applied outside of a clinical setting. With this conviction, Daniels began to consider the impact of applying behavioral science to the workplace.

Daniels was an author and speaker. He was the first editor of the Journal of Organizational Behavior Management (JOBM) in 1977.

== Performance Management ==
Performance Management (PM) was coined by Daniels in the late 1970s to describe a technology (i.e., science imbedded in applications methods) for managing both behavior and results, the two critical elements of what is known as performance.

The PM approach is used most often in the workplace but applies wherever people interact—schools, churches, community meetings, sports teams, health setting, governmental agencies, and political settings.

== Bibliography ==
- Oops! 13 Management Practices that Waste Time and Money (and what to do instead), Performance Management Publications, Atlanta, GA, 2009.
- Measure of a Leader, Performance Management Publications, Atlanta, GA, 2006.
- Bringing Out the Best in People: How to Apply the Astonishing Power of Positive Reinforcement, McGraw Hill, New York, NY, 1994, Revised 1999.
- Other People’s Habits: How to Use Positive Reinforcement to Bring Out the Best in People Around You, McGraw Hill, New York, NY, 2001.
- Performance Management: Improving Quality Productivity Through Positive Reinforcement, Performance Management Publications, Atlanta, GA, 1982 (with Theordore Rosen), Revised 1982, 1989.
- Performance Management: Changing Behavior That Drives Organizational Effectiveness, Performance Management Publications, Atlanta, GA, Revised with title change 2004.
- What is Behavior-Based Safety?, Aubrey C. Daniels, Performance Management Magazine, May 2010
- “Creating ‘Above and Beyond’ Performance,” Aubrey C. Daniels, Managing Performance Strategies for Global Leaders, October 2006
- “Parties with a Purpose,” Aubrey C. Daniels, SKY, December, 1992.
- Founder and editor, Journal of Organizational Behavior Management, 1977–78.
- “A Review of Theodoro Ayllon and Nathan Azrin: The Token Economy: A Motivational System for Therapy and Rehabilitation,” Reviewed by Aubrey C. Daniels, Contemporary Psychology.
- “Verbal Behavior in Group Psychotherapy,” Aubrey C. Daniels’ unpublished Doctoral Dissertation, University of Florida, Gainesville, FL, 1965.
- “A Token Economy With ‘Automated’ Data Collection,” A. Daniels, B. Tanner, Behavior Therapy, p. 111-118, 1975-1976.
- “A Behavior Modification Program on an Inpatient and Outpatient Unit,” A. Daniels, D. Slavin, Behavioral Intervention in Human Problems, ed. H. C. Richard, Pergamon Press, 1971.

== Death ==
He died in Decatur, Georgia on March 1, 2025 at the age of 89.
