= Charles Mace =

F. Charles Mace is a behavioral psychologist. He received his undergraduate degree at the University of Wisconsin–Eau Claire and received his doctorate at the University of Arizona. He is well known for his research on the functional analysis of severe behavior disorders, behavioral momentum, and the matching law. He has published over one hundred articles and chapters.

He previously served as president of the Society for the Experimental Analysis of Behavior, was a Fellow in the Association for Behavior Analysis, and was past editor of the Journal of Applied Behavior Analysis, as well as a recipient of the D.F. Hake Award for Distinguished Contributions to Basic and Applied Research. He has taught at Lehigh University, Rutgers University and at the University of Pennsylvania School of Medicine.
