= Brian Iwata =

American psychologist (1948–2023)

Brian A. Iwata
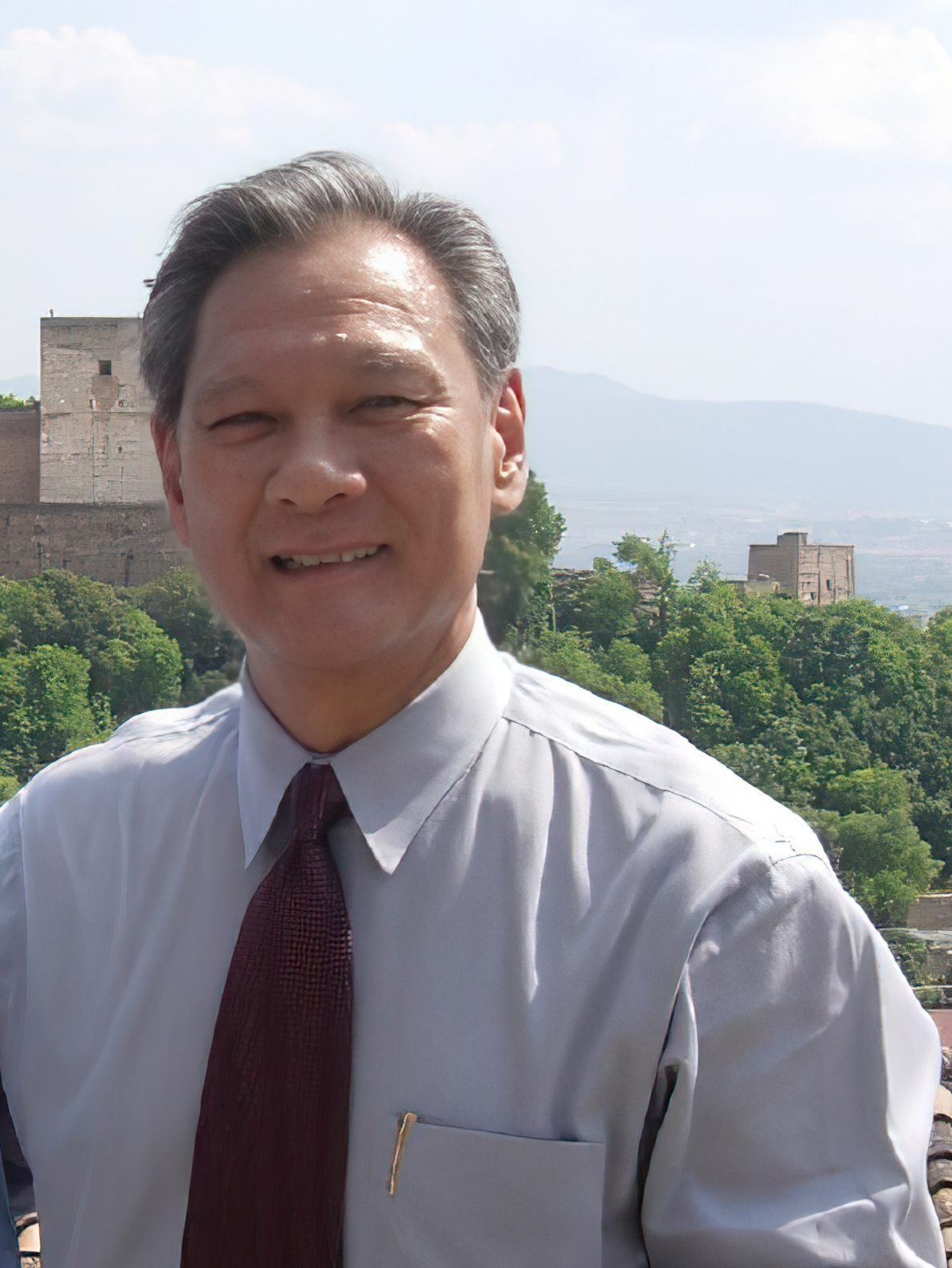
- Iwata in 2006
- Born: August 20, 1948; Scotch Plains, New Jersey, U.S.
- Died: October 7, 2023 (aged 75); Gainesville, Florida, U.S.
- Education: Florida State University
- Occupations: Psychologist; professor
- Employer: University of Florida
- Known for: Applied Behavior Analysis, Functional analysis

Brian Anthony Iwata (August 20, 1948 – October 7, 2023) was an American psychologist. He was a distinguished professor at University of Florida.

== Research ==
Iwata was best known for his article, "Toward a Functional Analysis of Self-Injury" which was initially published in 1982 and was republished in 1994 in the Journal of Applied Behavior Analysis. Iwata and his coauthors developed an approach to determining why self-injury was happening on an individual basis, which involved empirically measuring the role of environmental events on self-injurious behavior to determine what function it played in helping the individual access reinforcement. This approach allowed for the development of function-based interventions emphasizing reinforcement instead of punishment.

Iwata was briefly involved in the evaluation of SIBIS, an approach to self-injurious behavior suppression that involved application of electric skin shock contingent on self-injury, but after being involved in a single research article, abandoned work in this area. He was not involved in the development of the graduated electronic decelerator or GED, which is an aversive conditioning device that delivers a powerful electric skin shock to punish behaviors considered undesirable. Dr. Iwata spoke out against the use of GEDs by the Judge Rotenberg Center and even testified in court against their use. He stated that he found success treating even the most difficult of self injurious behaviors using less punitive methods. His writing on this topic can be found in Iwata (1988) GEDs have since been banned in the United States by the United States Food and Drug Administration in 2020. Also, the Association for Behavior Analysis International published a position statement against the use of Contingent Electric Skin Shock in 2022.

== Death ==
Iwata died on October 7, 2023, at the age of 75.

== See also ==
- Nathan Azrin
