= Howard Rachlin =

American psychologist (1935–2021)

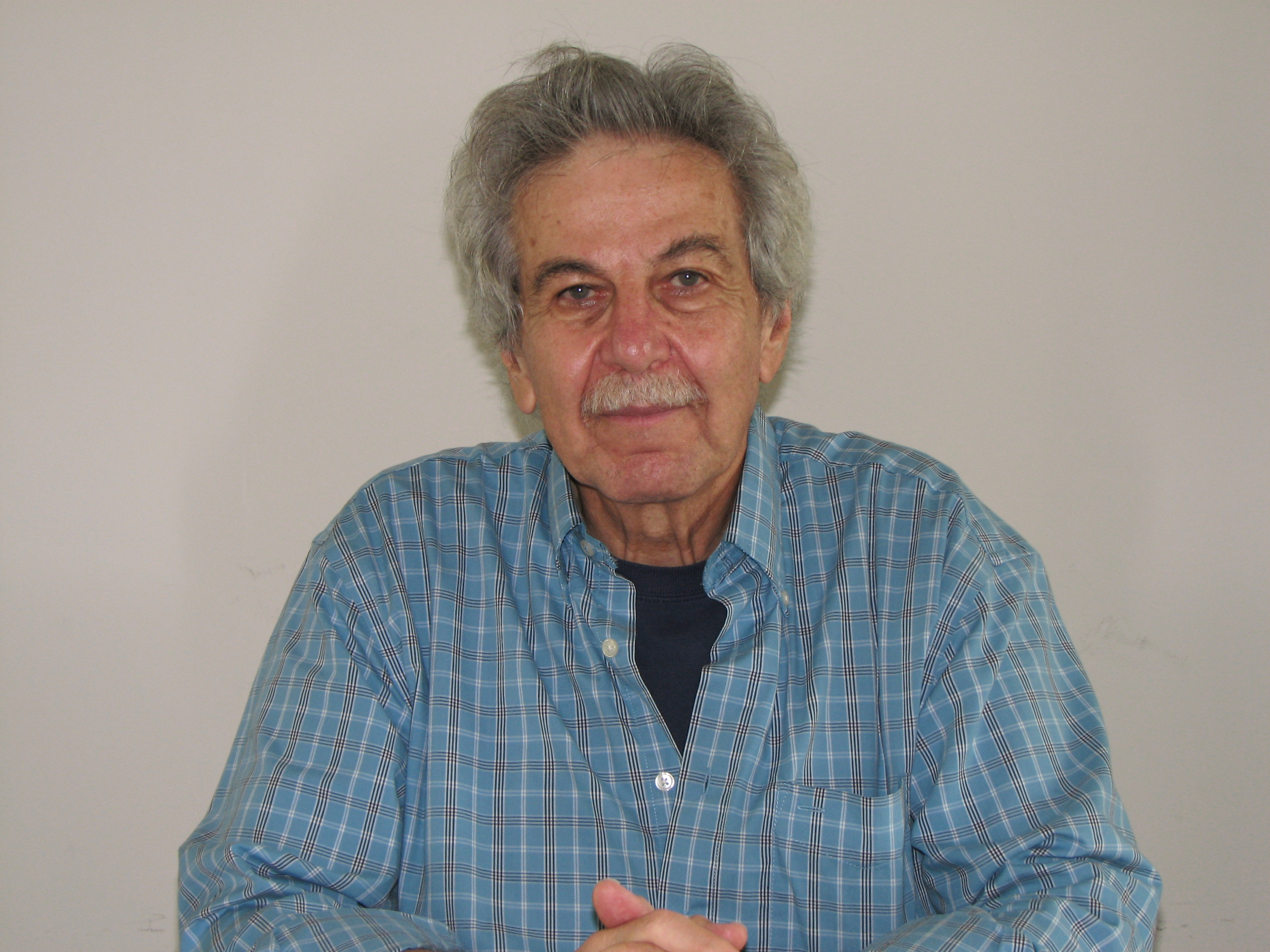
Rachlin in 2007

Howard Rachlin (1935–2021) was an American psychologist and the founder of teleological behaviorism. He was Emeritus Research Professor of Psychology, Department of Psychology at Stony Brook University in New York. His initial work was in the quantitative analysis of operant behavior in pigeons, on which he worked with William M. Baum, developing ideas from Richard Herrnstein's matching law. He subsequently became one of the founders of behavioral economics.

His most recent research focused on patterns of choice over time and how those patterns affect self-control (on which he worked with George Ainslie), including cooperation over time. His interests in Behavioral Economics included: decision making, the prisoner's dilemma, addiction, and gambling. He was one of the first board members of the Society for Quantitative Analysis of Behavior.

He was married to the novelist Nahid Rachlin. They had a daughter, Leila.

== Books ==
- Introduction to modern behaviorism (1970)
- Behavior and learning (1976)
- Behaviorism in everyday life (1980)
- Judgment, decision, and choice: a cognitive/behavioral synthesis (1989)
- Behavior and mind: the roots to modern psychology (1994)
- Science of self-control (2000)
- The escape of the mind (2014)

== Sources ==
- Rachlin H (November 1995). "Behavioral economics without anomalies". J Exp Anal Behav. 64 (3): 397–404. doi:10.1901/jeab.1995.64-397. PMC 1350146. PMID 8551195.
- Rachlin H (April 2002). "Altruism and selfishness". Behav Brain Sci. 25 (2): 239–50, discussion 251–96. doi:10.1017/S0140525X02000055. hdl:2027.42/83666. PMID 12744145.
- Rachlin H (May 2006). "Notes on discounting". J Exp Anal Behav. 85 (3): 425–35. doi:10.1901/jeab.2006.85-05. PMC 1459845. PMID 16776060.
