= Teleological behaviorism =

Type of behaviorism

Teleological behaviorism is a variety of behaviorism. Like all other forms of behaviorism it relies heavily on attention to outwardly observable human behaviors. Similarly to other branches of behaviorism, teleological behaviorism takes into account cognitive processes, like emotions and thoughts, but does not view these as empirical causes of behavior. Teleological behaviorism instead looks at these emotions and thoughts as behaviors themselves. Teleological behaviorism differs from other branches of Behaviorism through its focus on human capacity for self-control and also emphasizes the concept of free will.

== Overview ==
The founder of teleological behaviorism is Howard Rachlin, an Emeritus Research Professor of Psychology at the State University of New York, Stony Brook. Originally focusing his work on operant behavior, he eventually became interested in the concepts of free-will as they applied to Behavioral Economics and turned his interest to the related field of teleological behaviorism from there. A large influence for Rachlin’s work was Aristotle’s early philosophies on the mind, specifically how “Artistotle’s classification of movements in terms of final rather than efficient causes corresponds to B.F. Skinner’s conception of an operant as a class of movements with a common end”. This concept that Rachlin is referring to is Artistotle’s concept of Telos, “the final cause” that drives us all forward towards a common end. Rachlin also found heavy inspiration in the writings and work of Tolman and Bandura after their work in Behaviorism. An example of Artistotle’s concept of Telos could come from the concept of drinking water. While most behaviorists would approach drinking water as a direct reaction to being thirsty, Rachlin would also consider the long-term effects and consider that the person is drinking water so that they do not eventually die of thirst. This far-sighted view offers a different viewpoint into the behaviors of human beings that may not be explained as clearly by operant conditioning, a concept of Behavioral Psychology that mostly focuses upon the short-term reactions that someone has learned.

On the subject of self-control, Rachlin states that it is less of a subject of knowing that one should not do something and more a matter of patience. He considers those with strong self-control simply more “long-term behaviorally-oriented” or “far-sighted.” This concept of considering further implications in the future is related to many other fields, particularly Rachlin’s second interest of Behavioral Economics. He likens the ability to weight the options of the future to avoiding making short-term poor investments in exchange for profitable, more beneficial ones at a much later point in time.

Many people criticize Rachlin for his perspective, however, as his concepts of simply considering the potential reactions to certain situations over a longer time frame have been hailed as being closer to a self-help practice of making good investments and life choices than it is close to an actual Psychological practice. His main counter to this argument is that through this approach he has managed to help people by preparing them for potential negative outcomes in the future and trained them to recognize their own potential outcomes behind their actions.

Rachlin also has a different viewpoint on the subject of Free Will than most other people. He writes, “the meaning of free will lies not in what may or may not be going on in people’s heads or elsewhere in their bodies, but rather in how the term free will is actually used by the community to describe and to guide overt behavior” (Rachlin 2007). In other words, society’s definitions and expectations are what guide us in terms of what they consider right and wrong as any other external factors do. Our definitions of free-will are contingent upon how much we let them affect our actions.

== Sources ==
- Mele, Alfred (1994). "Teleological Behaviorism: A Review of Howard Rachlin's Behavior and Mind: The Roots of Modern Psychology". Behavior and Philosophy. 23 (2): 69–71. JSTOR 27759330.
- Rachlin, Howard (2007). "Free Will From the Viewpoint of Teleological Behaviorism". Behavioral Sciences and the Law. 25 (2): 235–250. doi:10.1002/bsl.746. PMID 17393402.
- Psychologistworld.com (2011). "Teleological Behaviorism". Psychologistworld.com.
