= Contingent contract =

A contingent contract or "contingency contract" is an agreement that states which actions under certain conditions will result in specific outcomes. Contingent contracts usually occur when negotiating parties fail to reach an agreement. The contract is characterized as "contingent" because the terms are not final and are based on certain events or conditions occurring.

A contingent contract can also be viewed as protection against a future change of plans. Contingent contracts can also lead to effective agreement when each party has different time preferences. For example, one party may desire immediate payoffs, while the other party may be interested in more long-term payoffs. Further, contingency contracts can foster an agreement in negotiations involving resolute differences of expectations about the future.

== Definition ==
An example of a definition can be found in Section 31, chapter III of the Indian Contract Act, 1872, which defines a contingent contract:

A "contingent contract" is a contract to do or not to do something, if some event, collateral to such contract, does or does not happen.

== Uses ==
Contingent contracts can be used in many types of settings such as work, school, home, etc. In regards to work, a common example of contingent contracts comes in the form of job negotiations. It usually involves the opportunity to discuss salary, position, promotion, etc. However, contingent contracts can often include negotiations regarding flextime, job sharing, responsibilities, etc. Although contingent contracts concerning employment packages are more the exception than the norm, these types of negotiations can be very successful, allowing both parties to walk away feeling very satisfied with the newly agreed upon arrangement.

The following examples are everyday agreements that may occur in the workplace:

- The employee and employer agree on a 1% bonus increase at the end of the year if the employee receives all excellent marks in their performance review.
- The employee will be allowed to work two days a week from home after having worked at the company for one year, and if they submit all reports on time.
- The employee will receive full insurance coverage after having worked at the company for one full year, with less than five sick days.

The following example illustrates a behavioral contract between a teenager and parents to be used in the home:

- The teenager agrees to attend all classes, complete homework on time, return home before curfew, communicate with parents in a respectful manner, etc.
- If the teenager violates any of the agreed upon rules, he will choose to suffer the consequences which involve being grounded, no television or Internet, not using the family car, etc.
- The parents agree that if the teenager performs the agreed upon behaviors, then the teenager will be able to keep his privileges.

A contingent contract can be used to create enormous benefit to both parties. One advantage would be that it limits the loss that would occur if the contract failed. Another would be that it would not make one party gain more at the expense of the other. This leads to an increase in trust between both parties, which would allow them to have more beneficial negotiations in the future. One area of commercial use concerns negotiations with suppliers to secure upstream sustainability improvements which can enhance end-product value: if a product can be delivered in a more sustainable manner, subject to appropriate performance metrics and audits, an enhanced rate might be paid compared to the non-sustainable product price.

== Features ==
In order to be most effective, contingent contracts should possess some of the following characteristics:

- The objectives for each party involved must be aligned.
- The promise is based on an uncertain event: the action required of one party is only dependent upon the occurrence of some event in the future.
- The event must be minor to the contract: the performance of a promise is not the event; rather it is part of the contract.
- The event is independent of the promising party: the occurrence of an event is not controlled by the promising party's will or desire.
- The agreements should be formalized in writing with appropriate legal counsel.
- The parties must mutually decide how the terms of agreement will be measured.

A contingency contract can also be viewed as protection against a future change of plans

== Value ==
Necessary is because the contract is built on expected differences from each party. Each party can leverage their differences through bets that lead to both sides winning. However, contingent contracts do not increase integrative value, rather they affect distribution value. Contingency contracts can create value by causing each negotiating party to stop arguing about their different beliefs. Both parties will be better off because they are each confident in their beliefs, ideas or projections.

== Risks and challenges ==
Contingency contracts can be beneficial for both parties by producing value and motivating performance, however there are some situations in which contingency contracts are not the best solution. Here are some limitations:

- Contingency contracts could be threatening if one party possesses or has access to more valuable information than the other. For example, it would be unfair if one party wanted to bet on the basis of ratings because they have better access to that information.
- Contingency contracts can be risky if both parties are not in agreement of how to measure objectively. For example, define clearly what it means to promote an employee "if (s)he does well", because each party may have different ideas or opinions about whether the contract has been met. This can lead to disagreement, which can cause great distress to the relationship between the parties.
- Contingency contracts can be dangerous if there are unequal incentives for each party. For example, there should be incentives for both parties to act in ways that are compatible with their agreement, thereby creating a win-win situation for both parties.

== Sources ==
- Brett, Jeanne M., Negotiating Globally: How to Negotiate Deals, Resolve Disputes, and Make Decisions Across Cultural Boundaries. John Wiley & Sons, 2007, p. 74.
- Krutzberg, Terri and Naquin, Charles, The Essentials of Job Negotiations: Proven Strategies for Getting What You Want. ABC-CLIO, 2011 p. 86-87.
- Malhotra, Deepak and Bazerman, Max, Negotiation Genius: How to Overcome Obstacles and Achieve Brilliant Results at the Bargaining Table and Beyond. Random House Digital, Inc, 2008, p. 69-71.
- Sharma, Ashok, Business Regulatory Framework. V.K. Enterprises, 2006, p. 87.
- Thompson, Leigh, The Truth About Negotiations. FT Press, 2012, p. 122-124.
