= Anna State Hospital =

- Choate Mental Health and Developmental Center

Geography
- Location: Anna, Illinois, United States
- Coordinates: 37°28′38″N 89°14′31″W

Organization
- Care system: Public

Services
- Beds: 270

History
- Founded: 1869

Links
- Website: dhs.state.il.us
- Lists: Hospitals in Illinois

Anna State Hospital, contemporarily known as Choate Mental Health and Developmental Center, is a public psychiatric hospital in Anna, Illinois, established in 1869. The original hospital was constructed under the Kirkbride Plan.

Choate has been accused of patient abuse and neglect since the late 1990s, and faced scrutiny by local media and public officials in 2022 following detailed accounts of violence against patients and lying to state investigators.
