= J. E. R. Staddon =

British-born American psychologist

- Born: John Eric Rayner Staddon

Academic background
- Education: University College London; Hollins College; Harvard University
- Thesis: The effect of "knowledge of results" on timing behavior in the pigeon (1964)

Academic work
- Discipline: Psychology
- Sub-discipline: Psychobiology

John Eric Rayner Staddon is a British-born American psychologist. who studied theoretical behaviorism. He has been a critic of Skinnerian behaviorism and proposed a theoretically-based "New Behaviorism".

== Life and career ==
Educated first at University College London, a three-year period interrupted by two years in Northern Rhodesia, now Zambia. After graduation from UCL, he went to the U. S., to Hollins College in Hollins, Virginia for a year, and then to Harvard University where he studied under Richard Herrnstein, obtaining his PhD in Experimental Psychology in 1964 with a thesis The effect of "knowledge of results" on timing behavior in the pigeon.

Staddon has done research at the MIT Systems Lab, the University of Oxford, the University of São Paulo at Ribeirão Preto, the National Autonomous University of Mexico, the Ruhr Universität, Universität Konstanz, the University of Western Australia and York University (U.K.) and taught at the University of Toronto from 1964 to 1967.

Since 1967, Staddon has been at Duke University; since 1983 he has been the James B. Duke Professor of psychology, and a professor of biology and neurobiology. Since 2007, he has been professor emeritus at Duke University.

== Books ==
- 1977, co-editor with W. K. Honig: Handbook of Operant behavior. Englewood Cliffs, N.J.: Prentice-Hall
- 1980, editor: Limits to action: The allocation of individual behavior. New York: Academic Press.
- 2001: Adaptive Dynamics: The Theoretical Analysis of Behavior. Cambridge, Massachusetts: MIT/Bradford
- 2012: The Malign Hand of the Markets. McGraw-Hill. Japanese translation: Shijo o ayatsuru jaku na te: Kin'yu shijo o hakai suru miezaru chikara.
- 2013: Unlucky Strike: Private Health and the Science, Law and Politics of Smoking. University of Buckingham Press ISBN 9781908684370, with foreword and illustrations by David Hockney
- 2016: The Englishman: Memoirs of a Psychobiologist. University of Buckingham Press
- 2016: Adaptive Behavior and Learning, 2nd Edition. Cambridge University Press)
- 2018: Scientific Method: How science works, fails to work and pretends to work. Routledge
- 2021: The New Behaviorism: Foundations of behavioral science, 3rd Edition. Psychology Press
- 2022: Science in an age of unreason. Regnery
- 2024: Scientific Method: How science works, fails to work or pretends to work. (Second edition) Taylor and Francis.
