= Motivating operation =

Behavioristic concept introduced in 1982

Motivating operation (MO) is a behavioristic concept introduced by Jack Michael in 1982. It is used to explain variations in the effects in the consequences of behavior. Most importantly, an MO affects how strongly the individual is reinforced or punished by the consequences of their behavior. For example, food deprivation is a motivating operation; if an individual (human or non-human animal) is hungry, food is strongly reinforcing, but if they are satiated, food is less reinforcing. In 2003 Laraway suggested subdividing MOs into those that increase the reinforcing or punishing effects of a stimulus, which are termed establishing operations, and MOs that decrease the reinforcing or punishing effects of a stimulus, which are termed abolishing operations.

== Theory ==
The concept of motivating operation deals with the observation that behavior depends not only on the stimuli present in the current situation and the organism's past experience with those stimuli, but also on the organism's recent past history of deprivation, satiation, pain, or other such influences. Such a past history can have two effects: it can change the value of a consequence by making it more or less reinforcing, and/or it can change the probability of behaviors that have produced that consequence. For example, food deprivation changes the value of food, making it more reinforcing, and it also evokes learned behaviors that have obtained food. Likewise, food satiation reduces both the reinforcing effect of food and the probability of food-getting behaviors.

Note that a motivating operation differs from a discriminative stimulus (Sd). A discriminative stimulus signals the availability of reinforcement, while a motivating operation changes the effectiveness of a reinforcer.

Nine main unconditioned (i.e. not learned) motivating operations, have been identified in humans. Deprivation of food, water, sleep, activity, sex, or oxygen; becoming too warm or too cold; and increase of a painful stimulus all function as establishing operations for related behaviors, and increase the effect of positive or negative reinforcement related to them. Conversely, being satiated with food, water, sleep, activity, oxygen and sex; getting cooler after being too warm or warmer after too cold; and decrease of a painful stimulus all function as abolishing operations for related behavior and reinforcement.

There are also conditioned motivating operations that result from the learning history of the organism. Three kinds of conditioned operations have been identified: a surrogate, reflexive, and transitive. A surrogate MO has the same effect as the MO it was paired with when it was learned; a reflexive MO acts as a reinforcement when it is removed; a transitive MO make something else effective as reinforcement. There is some debate as to whether an organism can be deprived or satiated from conditioned reinforcers.

== Theoretical note ==
The concept of motivational operations has been applied to Maslow's hierarchy of needs by describing the lower two levels as involving unconditioned MOs and the upper three levels as involving conditioned MOs.
