= Behaviour therapy =

Branch of psychotherapy

- ICD-9-CM: 94.33
- MeSH: D001521

Behaviour therapy or behavioural psychotherapy is a broad term referring to clinical psychotherapy that uses techniques derived from behaviourism and/or cognitive psychology. It looks at specific, learned behaviours and how the environment, or other people's mental states, influences those behaviours, and consists of techniques based on behaviourism's theory of learning: respondent or operant conditioning. Behaviourists who practice these techniques are either behaviour analysts or cognitive-behavioural therapists. They tend to look for treatment outcomes that are objectively measurable. Behaviour therapy does not involve one specific method, but it has a wide range of techniques that can be used to treat a person's psychological problems.

Behavioural psychotherapy is sometimes juxtaposed with cognitive psychotherapy. While cognitive behavioural therapy integrates aspects of both approaches, such as cognitive restructuring, positive reinforcement, habituation (or desensitisation), counterconditioning, and modelling.

Applied behaviour analysis (ABA) is the application of behaviour analysis that focuses on functionally assessing how behaviour is influenced by the observable learning environment and how to change such behaviour through contingency management or exposure therapies, which are used throughout clinical behaviour analysis therapies or other interventions based on the same learning principles.

Cognitive-behavioural therapy views cognition and emotions as preceding overt behaviour and implements treatment plans in psychotherapy to lessen the issue by managing competing thoughts and emotions, often in conjunction with behavioural learning principles.

A 2013 Cochrane review comparing behaviour therapies to psychological therapies found them to be equally effective, although at the time the evidence base that evaluates the benefits and harms of behaviour therapies was weak.

== History ==
Precursors of certain fundamental aspects of behaviour therapy have been identified in various ancient philosophical traditions, particularly Stoicism. For example, Wolpe and Lazarus wrote,

While the modern behavior therapist deliberately applies principles of learning to this therapeutic operations, empirical behavior therapy is probably as old as civilization – if we consider civilization as having started when man first did things to further the well-being of other men. From the time that this became a feature of human life there must have been occasions when a man complained of his ills to another who advised or persuaded him of a course of action. In a broad sense, this could be called behavior therapy whenever the behavior itself was conceived as the therapeutic agent. Ancient writings contain innumerable behavioral prescriptions that accord with this broad conception of behavior therapy.

The first use of the term behaviour modification appears to have been by Edward Thorndike in 1911. His article Provisional Laws of Acquired Behavior or Learning makes frequent use of the term "modifying behavior". Through early research in the 1940s and the 1950s the term was used by Joseph Wolpe's research group. The experimental tradition in clinical psychology used it to refer to psycho-therapeutic techniques derived from empirical research. It has since come to refer mainly to techniques for increasing adaptive behaviour through reinforcement and decreasing maladaptive behaviour through extinction or punishment (with emphasis on the former). Two related terms are behaviour therapy and applied behaviour analysis. Since techniques derived from behavioural psychology tend to be the most effective in altering behaviour, most practitioners consider behaviour modification along with behaviour therapy and applied behaviour analysis to be founded in behaviourism. While behaviour modification and applied behaviour analysis typically uses interventions based on the same behavioural principles, many behaviour modifiers who are not applied behaviour analysts tend to use packages of interventions and do not conduct functional assessments before intervening.

Possibly the first occurrence of the term "behavior therapy" was in a 1953 research project by B.F. Skinner, Ogden Lindsley, Nathan Azrin and Harry C. Solomon. The paper talked about operant conditioning and how it could be used to help improve the functioning of people who were diagnosed with chronic schizophrenia. Early pioneers in behaviour therapy include Joseph Wolpe and Hans Eysenck.

In general, behaviour therapy is seen as having three distinct points of origin: South Africa (Wolpe's group), the United States (Skinner), and the United Kingdom (Rachman and Eysenck). Each had its own distinct approach to viewing behaviour problems. Eysenck in particular viewed behaviour problems as an interplay between personality characteristics, environment, and behaviour. Skinner's group in the United States took more of an operant conditioning focus. The operant focus created a functional approach to assessment and interventions focused on contingency management such as the token economy and behavioural activation. Skinner's student Ogden Lindsley is credited with forming a movement called precision teaching, which developed a particular type of graphing program called the standard celeration chart to monitor the progress of clients. Skinner became interested in the individualising of programs for improved learning in those with or without disabilities and worked with Fred S. Keller to develop programmed instruction. Programmed instruction had some clinical success in aphasia rehabilitation. Gerald Patterson used programme instruction to develop his parenting text for children with conduct problems. (see Parent management training.) With age, respondent conditioning appears to slow but operant conditioning remains relatively stable. While the concept had its share of advocates and critics in the west, its introduction in the Asian setting, particularly in India in the early 1970s and its grand success were testament to the famous Indian psychologist H. Narayan Murthy's enduring commitment to the principles of behavioural therapy and biofeedback.

While many behaviour therapists remain staunchly committed to the basic operant and respondent paradigm, in the second half of the 20th century, many therapists coupled behaviour therapy with the cognitive therapy, of Aaron Beck, Albert Ellis, and Donald Meichenbaum to form cognitive behaviour therapy. In some areas the cognitive component had an additive effect (for example, evidence suggests that cognitive interventions improve the result of social phobia treatment.) but in other areas it did not enhance the treatment, which led to the pursuit of third generation behaviour therapies. Third generation behaviour therapy uses basic principles of operant and respondent psychology but couples them with functional analysis and a clinical formulation/case conceptualisation of verbal behaviour more inline with view of the behaviour analysts. Some research supports these therapies as being more effective in some cases than cognitive therapy, but overall the question is still in need of answers.

== Theoretical basis ==
The behavioural approach to therapy assumes that behaviour that is associated with psychological problems develops through the same processes of learning that affects the development of other behaviours. Therefore, behaviourists see personality problems in the way that personality was developed. They do not look at behaviour disorders as something a person has, but consider that it reflects how learning has influenced certain people to behave in a certain way in certain situations.

Behaviour therapy is based upon the principles of classical conditioning developed by Ivan Pavlov and operant conditioning developed by B.F. Skinner. Classical conditioning happens when a neutral stimulus comes right before another stimulus that triggers a reflexive response. The idea is that if the neutral stimulus and whatever other stimulus that triggers a response is paired together often enough that the neutral stimulus will produce the reflexive response. Operant conditioning has to do with rewards and punishments and how they can either increase or decrease certain behaviours.

Contingency management programs are a direct product of research from operant conditioning.

== Current forms ==
Behavioural therapy based on operant and respondent principles has considerable evidence base to support its usage. This approach remains a vital area of clinical psychology and is often termed clinical behaviour analysis. Behavioural psychotherapy has become increasingly contextual in recent years. Behavioural psychotherapy has developed greater interest in recent years in personality disorders as well as a greater focus on acceptance and complex case conceptualisations.

=== Functional analytic psychotherapy ===
One current form of behavioural psychotherapy is functional analytic psychotherapy. Functional analytic psychotherapy is a longer duration behaviour therapy. Functional analytic therapy focuses on in-session use of reinforcement and is primarily a relationally-based therapy. As with most of the behavioural psychotherapies, functional analytic psychotherapy is contextual in its origins and nature. and draws heavily on radical behaviourism and functional contextualism.

Functional analytic psychotherapy holds to a process model of research, which makes it unique compared to traditional behaviour therapy and cognitive behavioural therapy.

Functional analytic psychotherapy has a strong research support. Recent functional analytic psychotherapy research efforts are focusing on management of aggressive inpatients.

== Assessment ==
Behaviour therapists complete a functional analysis or a functional assessment that looks at four important areas: stimulus, organism, response and consequences. The stimulus is the condition or environmental trigger that causes behaviour. An organism involves the internal responses of a person, like physiological responses, emotions and cognition. A response is the behaviour that a person exhibits and the consequences are the result of the behaviour. These four things are incorporated into an assessment done by the behaviour therapist.

Most behaviour therapists use objective assessment methods like structured interviews, objective psychological tests or different behavioural rating forms. These types of assessments are used so that the behaviour therapist can determine exactly what a client's problem may be and establish a baseline for any maladaptive responses that the client may have. By having this baseline, as therapy continues this same measure can be used to check a client's progress, which can help determine if the therapy is working. Behaviour therapists do not typically ask the why questions but tend to be more focused on the how, when, where and what questions. Tests such as the Rorschach inkblot test or personality tests like the MMPI (Minnesota Multiphasic Personality Inventory) are not commonly used for behavioural assessment because they are based on personality trait theory assuming that a person's answer to these methods can predict behaviour. Behaviour assessment is more focused on the observations of a person's behaviour in their natural environment.

Behavioural assessment specifically attempts to find out what the environmental and self-imposed variables are. These variables are the things that are allowing a person to maintain their maladaptive feelings, thoughts and behaviours. In a behavioural assessment "person variables" are also considered. These "person variables" come from a person's social learning history and they affect the way in which the environment affects that person's behaviour. An example of a person variable would be behavioural competence. Behavioural competence looks at whether a person has the appropriate skills and behaviours that are necessary when performing a specific response to a certain situation or stimuli.

When making a behavioural assessment the behaviour therapist wants to answer two questions: (1) what are the different factors (environmental or psychological) that are maintaining the maladaptive behaviour and (2) what type of behaviour therapy or technique that can help the individual improve most effectively. The first question involves looking at all aspects of a person, which can be summed up by the acronym BASIC ID. This acronym stands for behaviour, affective responses, sensory reactions, imagery, cognitive processes, interpersonal relationships and drug use.

== Clinical applications ==
Behaviour therapy based its core interventions on functional analysis. Just a few of the many problems that behaviour therapy have functionally analysed include intimacy in couples relationships, forgiveness in couples, chronic pain, stress-related behaviour problems of being an adult child of a person with an alcohol use disorder, anorexia, chronic distress, substance abuse, depression, anxiety, insomnia and obesity.

Functional analysis has even been applied to problems that therapists commonly encounter like client resistance, partially engaged clients and involuntary clients. Applications to these problems have left clinicians with considerable tools for enhancing therapeutic effectiveness. One way to enhance therapeutic effectiveness is to use positive reinforcement or operant conditioning. Although behaviour therapy is based on the general learning model, it can be applied in a lot of different treatment packages that can be specifically developed to deal with problematic behaviours. Some of the more well known types of treatments are: Relaxation training, systematic desensitisation, virtual reality exposure, exposure and response prevention techniques, social skills training, modelling, behavioural rehearsal and homework, and aversion therapy and punishment.

Relaxation training involves clients learning to lower arousal to reduce their stress by tensing and releasing certain muscle groups throughout their body. Systematic desensitisation is a treatment in which the client slowly substitutes a new learned response for a maladaptive response by moving up a hierarchy of situations involving fear. Systematic desensitisation is based in part on counter conditioning. Counter conditioning is learning new ways to change one response for another and in the case of desensitisation it is substituting that maladaptive behaviour for a more relaxing behaviour. Exposure and response prevention techniques (also known as flooding and response prevention) is the general technique in which a therapist exposes an individual to anxiety-provoking stimuli while keeping them from having any avoidance responses.

Virtual reality therapy provides realistic, computer-based simulations of troublesome situations. The modelling process involves a person being subjected to watching other individuals who demonstrate behaviour that is considered adaptive and that should be adopted by the client. This exposure involves not only the cues of the "model person" as well as the situations of a certain behaviour that way the relationship can be seen between the appropriateness of a certain behaviour and situation in which that behaviour occurs is demonstrated. With the behavioural rehearsal and homework treatment a client gets a desired behaviour during a therapy session and then they practice and record that behaviour between their sessions. Aversion therapy and punishment is a technique in which an aversive (painful or unpleasant) stimulus is used to decrease unwanted behaviours from occurring. It is concerned with two procedures: 1) the procedures are used to decrease the likelihood of the frequency of a certain behaviour and 2) procedures that will reduce the attractiveness of certain behaviours and the stimuli that elicit them. The punishment side of aversion therapy is when an aversive stimulus is presented at the same time that a negative stimulus and then they are stopped at the same time when a positive stimulus or response is presented. Examples of the type of negative stimulus or punishment that can be used is shock therapy treatments, aversive drug treatments as well as response cost contingent punishment which involves taking away a reward.

Applied behaviour analysis is using behavioural methods to modify certain behaviours that are seen as being important socially or personally. There are four main characteristics of applied behaviour analysis. First behaviour analysis is focused mainly on overt behaviours in an applied setting. Treatments are developed as a way to alter the relationship between those overt behaviours and their consequences.

Another characteristic of applied behaviour analysis is how it (behaviour analysis) goes about evaluating treatment effects. The individual subject is where the focus of study is on, the investigation is centred on the one individual being treated. A third characteristic is that it focuses on what the environment does to cause significant behaviour changes. Finally the last characteristic of applied behaviour analysis is the use of those techniques that stem from operant and classical conditioning such as providing reinforcement, punishment, stimulus control and any other learning principles that may apply.

Social skills training teaches clients skills to access reinforcers and lessen life punishment. Operant conditioning procedures in meta-analysis had the largest effect size for training social skills, followed by modelling, coaching, and social cognitive techniques in that order. Social skills training has some empirical support particularly for schizophrenia. However, with schizophrenia, behavioural programs have generally lost favour.

Some other techniques that have been used in behaviour therapy are contingency contracting, response costs, token economies, biofeedback, and using shaping and grading task assignments.

Shaping and graded task assignments are used when behaviour that needs to be learned is complex. The complex behaviours that need to be learned are broken down into simpler steps where the person can achieve small things gradually building up to the more complex behaviour. Each step approximates the eventual goal and helps the person to expand their activities in a gradual way. This behaviour is used when a person feels that something in their lives can not be changed and life's tasks appear to be overwhelming.

Another technique of behaviour therapy involves holding a client or patient accountable of their behaviours in an effort to change them. This is called a contingency contract, which is a formal written contract between two or more people that defines the specific expected behaviours that you wish to change and the rewards and punishments that go along with that behaviour. In order for a contingency contract to be official it needs to have five elements. First it must state what each person will get if they successfully complete the desired behaviour. Secondly those people involved have to monitor the behaviours. Third, if the desired behaviour is not being performed in the way that was agreed upon in the contract the punishments that were defined in the contract must be done. Fourth if the persons involved are complying with the contract they must receive bonuses. The last element involves documenting the compliance and noncompliance while using this treatment in order to give the persons involved consistent feedback about the target behaviour and the provision of reinforcers.

Token economies is a behaviour therapy technique where clients are reinforced with tokens that are considered a type of currency that can be used to purchase desired rewards, like being able to watch television or getting a snack that they want when they perform designated behaviours. Token economies are mainly used in institutional and therapeutic settings. In order for a token economy to be effective there must be consistency in administering the program by the entire staff. Procedures must be clearly defined so that there is no confusion among the clients. Instead of looking for ways to punish the patients or to deny them of rewards, the staff has to reinforce the positive behaviours so that the clients will increase the occurrence of the desired behaviour. Over time the tokens need to be replaced with less tangible rewards such as compliments so that the client will be prepared when they leave the institution and won't expect to get something every time they perform a desired behaviour.

Closely related to token economies is a technique called response costs. This technique can either be used with or without token economies. Response costs is the punishment side of token economies where there is a loss of a reward or privilege after someone performs an undesirable behaviour. Like token economies this technique is used mainly in institutional and therapeutic settings.

Considerable policy implications have been inspired by behavioural views of various forms of psychopathology. One form of behaviour therapy, habit reversal training, has been found to be highly effective for treating tics.

=== In rehabilitation ===
Currently, there is a greater call for behavioural psychologists to be involved in rehabilitation efforts.

=== Treatment of mental disorders ===
Two large studies done by the Faculty of Health Sciences at Simon Fraser University indicate that both behaviour therapy and cognitive-behavioural therapy (CBT) are equally effective for OCD. CBT is typically considered the "first-line" treatment for OCD. CBT has also been shown to perform slightly better at treating co-occurring depression.

Considerable policy implications have been inspired by behavioural views of various forms of psychopathology. One form of behaviour therapy (habit reversal training) has been found to be highly effective for treating tics.

There has been a development towards combining techniques to treat psychiatric disorders. Cognitive interventions are used to enhance the effects of more established behavioural interventions based on operant and classical conditioning. An increased effort has also been placed to address the interpersonal context of behaviour.

Behaviour therapy can be applied to a number of mental disorders and in many cases is more effective for specific disorders as compared to others. Behaviour therapy techniques can be used to deal with any phobias that a person may have. Desensitisation has also been successfully applied to other issues such as dealing with anger, if a person has trouble sleeping and certain speech disorders. Desensitisation does not occur over night, there is a process of treatment. Desensitisation is done on a hierarchy and happens over a number of sessions. The hierarchy goes from situations that make a person less anxious or nervous up to things that are considered to be extreme for the patient.

Modelling has been used in dealing with fears and phobias. Fears are thought to develop through observational learning, and so positive modelling, when a person's behaviour is imitated, can used to counter these effects. In a systematic review of 1,677 papers, positive modelling was found to lower fear levels. Modelling has been used in the treatment of fear of snakes as well as a fear of water.

Aversive therapy techniques have been used to treat sexual deviations, as well as alcohol use disorder.

Exposure and prevention procedure techniques can be used to treat people who have anxiety problems as well as any fears or phobias. These procedures have also been used to help people dealing with any anger issues as well as pathological grievers (people who have distressing thoughts about a deceased person).

Virtual reality therapy deals with fear of heights, fear of flying, and a variety of other anxiety disorders. VRT has also been applied to help people with substance abuse problems reduce their responsiveness to certain cues that trigger their need to use drugs.

Shaping and graded task assignments has been used in dealing with suicide and depressed or inhibited individuals. This is used when a patient feel hopeless and they have no way of changing their lives. This hopelessness involves how the person reacts and responds to someone else and certain situations and their perceived powerlessness to change that situation that adds to the hopelessness. For a person with suicidal ideation, it is important to start with small steps. Because that person may perceive everything as being a big step, the smaller you start the easier it will be for the person to master each step. This technique has also been applied to people dealing with agoraphobia, or fear of being in public places or doing something embarrassing.

Contingency contracting has been used to effectively deal with behaviour problems in delinquents and when dealing with on task behaviours in students.

Token economies are used in controlled environments and are found mostly in psychiatric hospitals. They can be used to help patients with different mental illnesses but it doesn't focus on the treatment of the mental illness but instead on the behavioural aspects of a patient. The response cost technique has been used to successfully address a variety of behaviours such as smoking, overeating, stuttering, and psychotic talk.

=== Treatment outcomes ===
Systematic desensitisation has been shown to successfully treat phobias about heights, driving, insects as well as any anxiety that a person may have. Anxiety can include social anxiety, anxiety about public speaking as well as test anxiety. It has been shown that the use of systematic desensitisation is an effective technique that can be applied to a number of problems that a person may have.

When using modelling procedures this technique is often compared to another behavioural therapy technique. When compared to desensitisation, the modelling technique does appear to be less effective. However it is clear that the greater the interaction between the patient and the subject he is modelling the greater the effectiveness of the treatment.

While undergoing exposure therapy, a person typically needs five sessions to assess the treatment's effectiveness. After five sessions, exposure treatment has been shown to provide benefit to the patient. However, it is still recommended treatment continue beyond the initial five sessions.

Virtual reality therapy (VRT) has shown to be effective for a fear of heights. It has also been shown to help with the treatment of a variety of anxiety disorders. Due to the costs associated with VRT in 2007, therapists were still awaiting results of controlled trials investigating VRT, to assess which applications demonstrate the best results.

For those with suicidal ideation, treatment depends on how severe the person's depression and sense of hopelessness is. If these things are severe, the person's response to completing small steps will not be of importance to them, because they don't consider the success an accomplishment. Generally, in those without severe depression or fear, this technique has been successful, as completion of simpler activities builds their confidences and allows them to progress to more complex situations.

Contingency contracts have been seen to be effective in changing any undesired behaviours of individuals. It has been seen to be effective in treating behaviour problems in delinquents regardless of the specific characteristics of the contract.

Token economies have been shown to be effective when treating patients in psychiatric wards who had chronic schizophrenia. The results showed that the contingent tokens were controlling the behaviour of the patients.

Response costs has been shown to work in suppressing a variety of behaviours such as smoking, overeating or stuttering with a diverse group of clinical populations ranging from sociopaths to school children. These behaviours that have been suppressed using this technique often do not recover when the punishment contingency is withdrawn. Also undesirable side effects that are usually seen with punishment are not typically found when using the response cost technique.

== "Third generation" ==
Since the 1980s, a series of new behavioural therapies have been developed. These have been later labeled by Steven C. Hayes as "the third-generation" of behavioural therapy. Under this classification, the first generation of behavioural therapy is that independently developed in the 1950s by Joseph Wolpe, Ogden Lindsley and Hans Eysenck, while the second generation is the cognitive therapy developed by Aaron Beck in the 1970s.

Other authors object to the term "third generation" or "third wave" and incorporate many of the "third wave" therapeutic techniques under the general umbrella term of modern cognitive behavioural therapies.

This "third wave" of behavioural therapy has sometimes been called clinical behaviour analysis because it has been claimed that it represents a movement away from cognitivism and back toward radical behaviourism and other forms of behaviourism, in particular functional analysis and behavioural models of verbal behaviour. This area includes acceptance and commitment therapy (ACT), cognitive behavioural analysis system of psychotherapy (CBASP) (McCullough, 2000), behavioural activation (BA), dialectical behaviour therapy, functional analytic psychotherapy (FAP), integrative behavioural couples therapy, metacognitive therapy and metacognitive training. These approaches are squarely within the applied behaviour analysis tradition of behaviour therapy.

Acceptance and Commitment Therapy (ACT) may be the most well-researched of all the third-generation behaviour therapy models. It is based on relational frame theory. As of March 2022, there are over 900 randomised trials of Acceptance and Commitment Therapy and 60 mediational studies of the ACT literature. ACT has been included in over 275 meta-analyses and systematic reviews. As the result of multiple randomised trials of ACT by the World Health Organization, WHO now distribute ACT-based self-help for "anyone who experiences stress, wherever they live, and whatever their circumstances." As of March 2022, a number of different organisations have stated that Acceptance and Commitment Therapy is empirically supported in certain areas or as a whole according to their standards. These include: American Psychological Association, Society of Clinical Psychology (Div. 12), The World Health Organization, The United Kingdom National Institute for Health and Care Excellence (NICE), Australian Psychological Society, Netherlands Institute of Psychologists: Sections of Neuropsychology and Rehabilitation, Sweden Association of Physiotherapists, SAMHSA's National Registry of Evidence-based Programs and Practices, California Evidence-Based Clearinghouse for Child Welfare, and the U.S. Veterans Affairs/DoD.

Functional analytic psychotherapy is based on a functional analysis of the therapeutic relationship. It places a greater emphasis on the therapeutic context and returns to the use of in-session reinforcement. In general, 40 years of research supports the idea that in-session reinforcement of behaviour can lead to behavioural change.

Behavioural activation emerged from a component analysis of cognitive behaviour therapy. Researchers hope to prove that it can be complete treatment in its own right. Behavioural activation is based on a matching model of reinforcement. A recent review of the research, supports the notion that the use of behavioural activation is clinically important for the treatment of depression.

Integrative behavioural couples therapy developed from dissatisfaction with traditional behavioural couples therapy. Integrative behavioural couples therapy looks to Skinner (1966) for the difference between contingency-shaped and rule-governed behaviour. It couples this analysis with a thorough functional assessment of the couple's relationship. Recent efforts have used radical behavioural concepts to interpret a number of clinical phenomena including forgiveness.

A review study published in 2008, concluded that at the time, third-generation behavioural psychotherapies did not meet the criteria for empirically supported treatments.

== Organisations ==
Many organisations exist for behaviour therapists around the world. In the United States, the American Psychological Association's Division 25 is the division for behaviour analysis. The Association for Contextual Behavioral Science is another professional organisation. ACBS is home to many clinicians with specific interest in third generation behaviour therapy. Doctoral-level behaviour analysts who are psychologists belong to American Psychological Association's Division 25 – behaviour analysis. APA offers a diploma in behavioural psychology.

The Association for Behavioral and Cognitive Therapies (formerly the Association for the Advancement of Behavior Therapy) is for those with a more cognitive orientation. The ABCT also has an interest group in behaviour analysis, which focuses on clinical behaviour analysis. In addition, the Association for Behavioral and Cognitive Therapies has a special interest group on addictions.

== Characteristics ==
By nature, behavioural therapies are empirical (data-driven), contextual (focused on the environment and context), functional (interested in the effect or consequence a behaviour ultimately has), probabilistic (viewing behaviour as statistically predictable), monistic (rejecting mind–body dualism and treating the person as a unit), and relational (analysing bidirectional interactions).

Behavioural therapy develops, adds and provides behavioural intervention strategies and programs for clients, and training to people who care to facilitate successful lives in various communities.

== Training ==
Recent efforts in behavioural psychotherapy have focused on the supervision process. A key point of behavioural models of supervision is that the supervisory process parallels the behavioural psychotherapy provided.

== See also ==
- Behaviour management
- Covert conditioning
- Decoupling
- Matching law
- Observational learning
- Professional practice of behaviour analysis

== Sources ==
- Bellack, A.S.; Hersen, M. (1985). Dictionary of Behavior Therapy Techniques. General Psychology Series. Pergamon Press. ISBN 978-0-08-030168-6.
- Boyle, S.W. (2006). "Knowledge and Skills for Intervention". Direct Practice in Social Work (1st ed.). Pearson/Allyn & Bacon. ISBN 978-0-205-40162-8.
- O'Leary, K.D.; Wilson, G.T. (1975). Behavior Therapy: Application and Outcome. Prentice-Hall series on social learning theory. Prentice-Hall. ISBN 978-0-13-073890-5.
- Rimm, David; Masters, John C. (1974). Behavior therapy: techniques and empirical findings. New York: Academic Press. ISBN 0-12-588850-3. OCLC 793562.
- Schaefer, H.H.; Martin, P.L. (1969). Behavioral Therapy. Blakiston Division, McGraw-Hill.
