= Behavior analysis (disambiguation) =

Behavior analysis or behavior analytics may refer to:

- Applied behavior analysis
- Behavior analysis of child development
- Behavioral analytics, in business analytics
- Behaviorism, where behavior analysis is practiced
- Clinical behavior analysis
- Licensed behavior analyst
- Professional practice of behavior analysis
- Quantitative analysis of behavior
- User behavior analytics, in cybersecurity
