= Clinical formulation =

Explanation of information obtained from a clinical assessment

A clinical formulation, also known as case formulation, case conceptualisation, and problem formulation, is a theoretically based explanation or conceptualisation of the information obtained from a clinical assessment. It offers a hypothesis about the cause and nature of the presenting problems and is considered an adjunct or alternative approach to the more categorical approach of psychiatric diagnosis. In clinical practice, formulations are used to communicate a hypothesis and provide a framework for developing the most suitable treatment approach. It is most commonly used by mental health professionals and is deemed to be a core component of that profession. Clinical psychologists, mental health nurses, social workers, and some psychiatrists use this formulation based on specific psychological frameworks.

== Types of formulation ==
Different psychological schools or models utilize clinical formulations, including cognitive behavioral therapy (CBT) and related therapies: systemic therapy, psychodynamic therapy, and applied behavior analysis. The structure and content of a clinical formulation is determined by the psychological model. Most systems of formulation contain the following broad categories of information: symptoms and problems; precipitating stressors or events; predisposing life events or stressors; and an explanatory mechanism that links the preceding categories together and offers a description of the precipitants and maintaining influences of the person's problems.

Behavioral case formulations used in applied behavior analysis and behavior therapy are built on a rank list of problem behaviors, from which a functional analysis is conducted, sometimes based on relational frame theory. Such functional analysis is also used in third-generation behavior therapy or clinical behavior analysis such as acceptance and commitment therapy and functional analytic psychotherapy. Functional analysis looks at setting events (ecological variables, history effects, and motivating operations), antecedents, behavior chains, the problem behavior, and the consequences, short- and long-term, for the behavior.

A model of formulation that is more specific to CBT is described by Jacqueline Persons. This has seven components: problem list, core beliefs, precipitants and activating situations, origins, working hypothesis, treatment plan, and predicted obstacles to treatment.

A psychodynamic formulation would consist of a summarizing statement, a description of nondynamic factors, description of core psychodynamics using a specific model (such as ego psychology, object relations or self psychology), and a prognostic assessment which identifies the potential areas of resistance in therapy.

One school of psychotherapy which relies heavily on the formulation is cognitive analytic therapy (CAT). CAT is a fixed-term therapy, typically of around 16 sessions. At around session four, a formal written reformulation letter is offered to the patient which forms the basis for the rest of the treatment. This is usually followed by a diagrammatic reformulation to amplify and reinforce the letter.

Many psychologists use an integrative psychotherapy approach to formulation. This is to take advantage of the benefits of resources from each model the psychologist is trained in, according to the patient's needs.

== Critical evaluation of formulations ==
The quality of specific clinical formulations, and the quality of the general theoretical models used in those formulations, can be evaluated with criteria such as:

- Clarity and parsimony: Is the model understandable and internally consistent, and are key concepts discrete, specific, and non-redundant?
- Precision and testability: Does the model produce testable hypotheses, with operationally defined and measurable concepts?
- Empirical adequacy: Are the posited mechanisms within the model empirically validated?
- Comprehensiveness and generalizability: Is the model holistic enough to apply across a range of clinical phenomena?
- Utility and applied value: Does it facilitate shared meaning-making between clinician and client, and are interventions based on the model shown to be effective?

Formulations can vary in temporal scope from case-based to episode-based or moment-based, and formulations may evolve during the course of treatment. Therefore, ongoing monitoring, testing, and assessment during treatment are necessary: monitoring can take the form of session-by-session progress reviews using quantitative measures, and formulations can be modified if an intervention is not as effective as hoped.

== History ==
Psychologist George Kelly, who developed personal construct theory in the 1950s, noted his complaint against traditional diagnosis in his book The Psychology of Personal Constructs (1955): "Much of the reform proposed by the psychology of personal constructs is directed towards the tendency for psychologists to impose preemptive constructions upon human behaviour. Diagnosis is all too frequently an attempt to cram a whole live struggling client into a nosological category." In place of nosological categories, Kelly used the word "formulation" and mentioned two types of formulation: a first stage of structuralization, in which the clinician tentatively organizes clinical case information "in terms of dimensions rather than in terms of disease entities" while focusing on "the more important ways in which the client can change, and not merely ways in which the psychologist can distinguish him from other persons", and a second stage of construction, in which the clinician seeks a kind of negotiated integration of the clinician's organization of the case information with the client's personal meanings.

Psychologists Hans Eysenck, Monte B. Shapiro, Vic Meyer, and Ira Turkat were also among the early developers of systematic individualized alternatives to diagnosis. Meyer has been credited with providing perhaps the first training course of behaviour therapy based on a case formulation model, at the Middlesex Hospital Medical School in London in 1970. Meyer's original choice of words for clinical formulation were "behavioural formulation" or "problem formulation".

== Data-Informed Clinical Formulation ==
Modern approaches to clinical formulation increasingly emphasize the use of routine outcome measurement (ROM) to validate and refine case conceptualizations. By integrating Feedback-Informed Treatment (FIT) into the formulation process, supervisors can help trainees use self-report inventories (such as the Outcome Rating Scale) to test their clinical hypotheses and measure clinical progress. This iterative process allows for a more responsive treatment plan that can be adjusted if the client's progress deviates from the formulated trajectory. Some clinical supervisor training programs integrate data-informed clinical formulation protocols, leading to more accurate and effective clinical formulations.

== See also ==
- Clinical decision support system
- Clinical guideline
- Clinical pathway
- Common factors theory
- Problem structuring methods
- SOAP note
- Therapeutic assessment
- Treatment decision support (tools for clients)
