= Behavioral experiment =

Technically, all scientific experiments measure a change in hypothesized causal behavior, and may drop the behavioral prefix.

Behavioral experiment may refer to:

- Behavioral experiment (analysis)
- Behavioral experiment (animals), for controlling variables (vs. field studies)
- Behavioral experiment (cognitive science), for determining what constitutes intelligent behavior
- Behavioral experiment (cognitive therapy), method for cognitive restructuring
- Behavioral experiment (cognitive behavioral therapy), for testing the validity of negative and alternative thoughts in real-life situations
- Behavioral experiment (computational modeling), of computational model for comparison with human data
- Behavioral experiment (experimental psychology), for measuring reaction time, choices among alternatives, and/or response rate or strength
- Behavioral experiment (human reasoning), for studying human reasoning
- Behavioral experiment (conditional reasoning), on conditionals in the psychology of reasoning
- Behavioral experiment (psychotherapy), for identifying potentially negative or harmful beliefs

== See also ==
- Behaviorism, which is based on such experiments
- Experiment
  - Category:Science experiments
- Behavior
