= Behavioral cusp =

Psychological concept

A behavioral cusp is any behavior change that brings an organism's behavior into contact with new contingencies that have far-reaching consequences. A behavioral cusp is a special type of behavior change because it provides the learner with opportunities to access new reinforcers, new contingencies, new environments, new related behaviors (generativeness) and competition with archaic or problem behaviors. It affects the people around the learner, and these people agree to the behavior change and support its development after the intervention is removed.

The concept has far reaching implications for every individual, and for the field of developmental psychology, because it provides a behavioral alternative to the concept of maturation and change due to the simple passage of time, such as developmental milestones. The cusp is a behavior change that presents special features when compared to other behavior changes.

== History ==
The concept was first proposed by Sidney W. Bijou, an American developmental psychologist. The idea of the cusp was to link behavioral principles to rapid spurts in development (see Behavior analysis of child development).

A behavioral cusp as conceptualized by Jesus Rosales-Ruiz and Donald Baer in 1997 is an important behavior change that affects future behavior changes. The behavioral cusp, like the reinforcer, is apprehended by its effects. Whereas a reinforcer acts on a single response or a group of related responses, the effects of a behavioral cusp regulate a large number of responses in a more distant future.

The concept has been compared to a developmental milestone; however, not all cusps are milestones. For example, learning to play soccer is not a milestone, but it was life-changing for Pelé. As a result of learning to kick grapefruits (the initial important change or cusp), Pelé accessed (1) new environments, (2) new reinforcers, (3) new soccer moves, (4) dropped competing behaviors (smoking), and (5) gained international acclaims for his skill. Soccer is not a developmental milestone because it is not a necessary skill in most environments.

== Properties ==
The following properties are special features of a behavioral change that lead to more change, and an increased likelihood of social adaptation, independence, and cultural fitness.

=== New reinforcers ===
New reinforcers are accessible and enrich the perspective of the learner. Additionally these reinforcers may lead to an increase in the variety of behaviors. If the reinforcers are promoting health and social behaviors, they will lead to an improved quality of life.

==== Case example ====
A child who learns to open a door may access the swing for the first time and learns to use the swing. Here, the new skill (swinging motion is the reinforcer) may lead to more complex and social activities such as (1) turn taking, (2) asking someone to share the swing, (3) taking turns pushing someone, which in turn (4) may provide more social opportunities to speak and (5) interact with the play partners, etc.

==== Case non-example ====
A child learns to open a door and walks outside. He finds some ants behind a shrubbery and watches the ants. His parents are looking for him, they get worried and are calling him. The child is unusually mesmerized by columns of ants on the ground and does not hear the calls. His parents find him shortly after, but they are frantic from their 5-minute search and accidentally scare him from going outside. In this non-example, learning to open doors that lead outside resulted in consequences that did not directly benefit the child and maybe decrease important skills related to exploration and search. In this case, no new reinforcers were contacted and learning to open the backyard door (that has a special latch) was effectively a waste of time because the child's parents don't usually approve being alone in the backyard.

=== New contingencies of reinforcement ===
New contingencies are responsible for the selection of novel and more adaptive behaviors while decreasing problematic or archaic behaviors. Contingencies of reinforcement (before > R > Reinforcer) produce and maintain each and every learned behavior. New contingencies establish the control of new stimuli over our behaviors, and therefore make us more sensitive and aware of our surrounding.

=== New environments ===
New environments are geographical and/or virtual areas of potential change (receiving environments). New environments regulate, maintain, and set the micro-cultural boundaries for reinforcers (and punishers), and their antecedents. They include tools and stakeholders controlling the pace and content of instruction and, as a result, they regulate boundary of what the learner learns (e.g., school curriculum). Practitioners are confident that their cusp will lead to the desired behavior and open the door to new environments. New environments must contain some of the stakeholders' preferences and reinforcers to create lasting positive reinforcement practices for the learner. An important consideration is the time (and timing) of cusp events and ensuing behaviors in the context of historical events--history.

=== Generativeness ===
Generativeness describes the ability of the receiving environment to regulate novel responses, functions, values or response products derived from the original cusp response. Some proposals have been put forward to explain how conscious organisms achieve passing into new frames of reference. Semiotic Matrix Theory (SMT), its pansemiosis, describes falsifiable existential and cognitive heuristics of recognizing Energy requirements, Safety concerns and Possibility or Opportunity as “passing” functions. For a behavior, it is the ability to recombine or merge into more complex units, or the ability to contact environments.

=== Competition with archaic behaviors ===
Behavior competition is the ability of cusp behaviors to displace previously established behaviors on a continuum of intensity and rate, across repertoires, and environments. Competing archaic behaviors occur on a corresponding continuum of severity. An example of this was illustrated in Frank Sulloway's research dealing, among other findings, with the likelihood that first versus second borns would embrace new ideas and act upon them. In the context of behavioral cusps, second-borns possessed and understood information that could allow them to 'see beyond' the limitations of archaic notions of "evolution" or the ideological reprimands of organized and conservative religion. From a semiotic perspective, everyday communication provide us with important cues about how interlocutors reveal the degree to which behavioral cusps are or have taken place.

=== Effect on stakeholders ===
Effect on others comes from the learner's behavior affecting the stakeholders who control reinforcers and punishers in a specific environment. It is important to identify these stakeholders' motivations and reinforcers in selecting potential cusps. Effect refers to the changes in values and behaviors of the stakeholder resulting from a cusp in the learner. The initial and gradually more complex behaviors that constituted the entry point for an important behavior change that, once initiated, so profoundly alters, displaces, or transforms one's behavioral repertoire that it renders preexisting behavioral repertoires obsolete. A behavioral cusp is an important behavior change that alters the probability of the learner's future repertoires and interactions with stakeholders' repertoires.

=== Social validity ===
Social validity is an indicator of social acceptability of a behavior and its consequences for the stakeholders representing the communities which the learner is accessing or will access. Some seemingly insignificant changes in a stakeholder may dramatically affect the learner. All stakeholders (e.g., government officials, teachers, parents, and other interventionists) should agree to the goals, methods, and tools for the intervention and the norms from the local community suggest the boundaries of what should be learned.

== Applications ==
=== Life span/development guidelines ===
The behavioral cusp has implications for the selection and sequencing of skills during the life span. While milestones are mainly concerned with the chronology of behaviors, the concept of behavioral cusp is concerned with the fitness of the behavior within a context or a receiving environment. As Rosales-Ruiz and Baer (1997) stated, "One child's cusp may be another child's waste of time." Thus, there is a great need for empirically-based guidelines in making decisions related to the initial selection of skills.

=== Prediction and control of development over longer periods of time ===
The applications of the concepts are related to the prediction, selection, and retention of successful and adaptive behaviors to the treatment of childhood autism, Down syndrome, and other developmental disabilities – they are also humane and based on evidence from the field of behavior analysis. The first applications of the concept derive from a set of guidelines proposed by Bosch and Fuqua in The Journal of Applied Behavior Analysis.

=== Development of new technology ===
A new technology and methodology, necessary to measure the effects of a small change over time, will reveal a strong dependence on the initial conditions selected by a cusp specialist (butterfly effect).

Cusp Applications
Education	Teacher Training	Post-Curriculum/instructional Design	Job Placement and Retention
Industry	Performance Management	Job Satisfaction	Products Analysis
Behavioral Medicine	Disease Prevention	Healthy Life Style	Cost Analysis

== Future research ==
Future research will elucidate the nature and parameters of the criteria and the tools used in the selection and sequencing of skills.

As importantly, the existing parameters (proposed by Rosales-Ruiz, Baer, Bosch, & Fuqua) provides justifications for behavioral interventions.

== See also ==
- Applied behavior analysis
- Attachment in children
- Behavior analysis of child development
- Behaviorism
- Child development
- Child development stages
- Child psychology
- Critical period
- Early childhood education
- Face validity
- Feral child
- Functional analysis (psychology)
- Pedagogy
- Play (activity)
- Professional practice of behavior analysis
- Psychological behaviorism
