= Mavis Tsai =

American psychologist and author

- Education: University of California, Los Angeles, University of Washington
- Known for: Functional analytic psychotherapy
- Medical career
- Field: Clinical psychology Social psychology Psychotherapy
- Institutions: University of Washington

Mavis Tsai is a psychologist and author. She is a senior research scientist at the University of Washington. She is one of the creators of functional analytic psychotherapy (FAP). Tsai is the director specializing in FAP at the University of Washington's Psychological Services and Training Center. Her books have been translated to Korean, Japanese, Portuguese, Spanish, Italian and Persian.

== Education ==
Tsai earned a bachelor's degree in psychology from the UCLA. In 1982, she obtained her PhD in clinical psychology from the University of Washington.

== Career ==
Tsai began working as a senior research scientist at the University of Washington in 2014. In 2015, she co-founded Awareness, Courage and Love Global Project. Tsai became the director of UW Psychological Services and Training Center FAP Clinic in 2018.

Tsai practices clinical psychology independently. Her areas of interests are social connections, personal development and healing. She believes in a multifaceted approach to growth and healing by integrating the emotions, mind, body and spirit. Tsai has implemented Eastern philosophy into psychotherapy.

=== Awareness, Courage and Love Global Project ===
It is a global, nonprofit organization that aims to address loneliness as a major health issue. Social isolation leads to a variety of psychological and health risks and the organization aims to alleviate it. The organization focuses on fostering authentic and meaningful connections. Tsai serves as its director.

== Research ==
Tsai has co-authored over 60 publications concerning trauma, relationships, behavior and therapy.

=== Functional analytic psychotherapy ===
Tsai and Robert Kohlenberg first conceptualized functional analytic therapy after noticing the influence of relationships in patient outcomes. It has been refined throughout the years.

== Selected works ==
=== Books ===
- Functional Analytic Psychotherapy: Creating Intense and Curative Therapeutic Relationships (1991) with Robert Kohlenberg
- A Guide to Functional Analytic Psychotherapy: Awareness, Courage, Love, and Behaviorism (2009), with Robert Kohlenberg, Jonathan Kanter, Barbara Kohlenberg, William C. Folette and Glenn M. Calaghan
- The Practice of Functional Analytic Psychotherapy (2010), with Jonathan Kanter and Robert Kohlenberg
- Functional Analytic Psychotherapy: Distinctive Features (2012), with Robert Kohlenberg, Jonathan Kanter, Gareth Holman and Mary Plummer Loudon
- Functional Analytic Psychotherapy Made Simple: A Practical Guide to Therapeutic Relationships (2017), with Gareth Holman, Jonathan Kanter and Robert Kohlenberg.
