= Ogden Lindsley =

American psychologist

Ogden R. Lindsley (August 11, 1922, in Providence, Rhode Island – October 10, 2004) was an American psychologist. He is best known for developing precision teaching (including the Standard Celeration Chart).

In 1948, he obtained an A.B. in Psychology from Brown University and two years later in 1950 a Sc.M. in Experimental Psychology. At Harvard University he studied Psychology under B. F. Skinner, earning his Ph.D. in 1957.

In 1953, Lindsley started the Behavior Research Laboratory at Harvard Medical School (Massachusetts Mental Health Center). There he analyzed the behavior of persons with schizophrenia. This was the first human operant laboratory. He invented the term "behavior therapy".

During the time O. R. Lindsley was Director of the Behavior Research Laboratory (from 1956 to 1961), Lindsley was a Research Associate in Psychiatry at Harvard Medical School. From 1961 to 1965, he was an Associate in Psychology. In 1962, Lindsley was awarded the Hofheimer Research Prize by the American Psychiatric Association.

In 1965, Lindsley gave up the laboratory and moved into special education teacher training at the University of Kansas. From 1965 to 1971, he was Director of Educational Research in the Medical Center and a Research Associate in the Bureau of Child Research. In 1971 he was appointed a professor in education at the University of Kansas until he retired in 1990. He was an active emeritus professor until his death. Ogden Lindsley died of bile duct cancer on October 10, 2004, aged 82, at the Kansas University Medical Center with his wife, Nancy, at his side.

== Selected works ==
- Lindsley, Ogden R. (1990). "Precision Teaching: By Teachers for Children". Teaching Exceptional Children. 22 (3): 10–15. doi:10.1177/004005999002200302. S2CID 146504511.
- Lindsley, Ogden R. (1991). "Precision teaching's unique legacy from B. F. Skinner". Journal of Behavioral Education. 1 (2): 253–266. doi:10.1007/BF00957007. S2CID 144257248.
- Lindsley, Ogden R. (1992). "Precision Teaching: Discoveries and Effects". Journal of Applied Behavior Analysis. 25: 51–57. doi:10.1901/jaba.1992.25-51. PMC 1279649. PMID 16795771.
- Lindsley, Ogden R. (1992). "Why Aren't Effective Teaching Tools Widely Adopted?". Journal of Applied Behavior Analysis. 25 (1): 21–26. doi:10.1901/jaba.1992.25-21. PMC 1279644. PMID 16795766.
