= Behavioral activation =

Type of behavior therapy

Behavioral activation is a form of psychotherapy that emphasizes engaging in potentially mood-boosting activities. It involves the understanding of an individual's specific behaviors and the use of methods, such as planning, to enable them to overcome avoidance.

As a psychotherapeutic modality, it is considered a form of clinical behavior analysis, or third-generation behavior therapy. It owes its basis to Charles Ferster's Functional Analysis of Depression (1973), which developed B. F. Skinner's idea of depression. The theory holds that not enough environmental reinforcement or too much environmental punishment can contribute to depression. The goal of the intervention is to increase environmental reinforcement and reduce punishment.

Behavioral activation is often used in cognitive behavioral therapy. It is also used in applied behavior analysis, clinical behavior analysis, and functional analytic psychotherapy.

== Theory ==
Behavioral activation is a form of clinical behavior analysis, or third-generation behavior therapy. Other behavior therapies include acceptance and commitment therapy and dialectical behavior therapy. Behavioral activation is generally regarded as a versatile and effective tool in addressing psychological challenges from different angles, often being can be integrated into other psychotherapies. Behavioral activation owes its basis to Charles Ferster's Functional Analysis of Depression (1973), which developed B. F. Skinner's idea of depression as a lack of reinforcement within his theory of motivation.

Ferster's basic model has been strengthened by further development in the study of reinforcement principles, which has led to the matching law and continuing theoretical advances in the possible functions of depression. Research has also examined behavior analysis of child development in order to determine long-term patterns which may lead to dysthymia. Behavioral activation utilizes positive reinforcements to increase good behavior and reduces negative outcomes from avoidance in order to increase an individual's self-control and personal regulation.

Behavioral activation emerged from a component analysis of cognitive behavioral therapy, which argued that any cognitive component added little to the overall treatment of depression. The behavioral component had existed as a standalone treatment in the early work of Peter Lewinsohn, and some behaviorists believed that it might be more efficient to pursue a purer behavioral treatment for the disorder.

The theory holds that not enough environmental reinforcement or too much environmental punishment can contribute to depression. The goal of the intervention is to increase environmental reinforcement and reduce punishment.

== Methods ==
One behavioral activation approach to depression has participants create a hierarchy of reinforcing activities, rank-ordered by difficulty. Participants then tracked goals along with clinicians who used a token economy to reinforce success in moving through the hierarchy of activities, being measured before and after by the Beck Depression Inventory. A markedly greater effect on their depression was found as a result of their treatment, as compared to a control group who did not receive the same treatment. Multiple clinics have since piloted and developed the method of treatment.

=== ACTION ===
Another behavioral activation approach is known as ACTION (Assess behavior/mood, Choose alternate responses, Try out those alternate responses, Integrate these alternatives, Observe results and (Now) evaluate). The goal of ACTION is the understanding of the relationship between actions and emotional consequences and a systematic replacement of dysfunctional patterns with adaptive ones. Additionally, focus is given to quality sleep, and improving social functioning.

The ACTION method aims to have clients develop an understanding of the relationship between actions and emotions, with actions being seen as the cause of emotions. An hourly self-monitoring chart is created to track activities and the impact on the mood they create for a full week, with the intention of identifying depression loops.

When patterns of dysfunctional responding, or loops, are identified, alternative coping responses are attempted to break the loop. This method is described with the acronyms "TRAP" (Trigger, Response, Avoidance Pattern) and "TRAC" (Trigger, Response, Alternate Coping response).

When rumination is identified as a particularly common avoidance behavior that worsens mood, another common acronym is RCA (Rumination Cues Action). The RCA mnemonic aims to have the client evaluate the rumination in terms of whether it has improved the thing being ruminated about, provided understanding, and had positive emotional effects. Attending to experience, as well as other possible distracting or mood improving actions, may be suggested as an alternative to rumination.

== Research support ==
=== Depression ===
Reviews of behavioral activation studies for depression found that it had a positive measurable effect and that policy makers should consider it an effective treatment. A large-scale treatment study found behavioral activation to be more effective than cognitive therapy and on par with medication for treating depression. A meta-analysis study comprising 34 randomized controlled trials found that while behavioral activation treatment of adults with depression showed significantly greater beneficial effect compared with control participants, compared to participants treated with CT/CBT, at post treatment there were no statistically significant differences between treatment groups. Another meta-analysis comprising 25 randomized controlled trials found a large effect size for behavioral activation compared to controls at post-treatment. A 2009 meta-analysis showed a medium post-treatment effect size compared to psychotherapy and other treatments. In a 2020 Cochrane review covering fifty-three studies and 5495 subjects it was suggested (limited confidence) that behavioral activation was more effective than treatment as usual and medication and no less effective than CBT, psychodynamic therapy or being placed on a waiting list. A meta-analysis from 2017 showed that behavioral activation can reduce depressive symptoms in older adults.

=== Anxiety ===
Behavioral activation strategies are utilized for clients who primarily experience anxiety. The core focus of these strategies is to address and disrupt patterns of anxious avoidance, which can often manifest as excessive worry. The ultimate goal is to motivate and encourage clients to actively engage in rewarding experiences and positive behaviors. A 2006 study of behavioral activation being applied to anxiety appeared to give promising results. One study found it to be effective with fibromyalgia-related pain anxiety. In another, researchers observed a notable improvement in the quality of life and a reduction in anxiety levels as a result of behavioral activation treatment.

== Virtual reality use ==
Due to a lack of access to trained providers, physical constraints or financial reasons, many patients are not able to attend behavioral activation therapy. Researchers are trying to overcome these challenges by providing behavioral activation via virtual reality. The idea of the concept is to enable especially elderly adults to participate in engaging activities that they would otherwise not attend without VR. Possibly, behavioral activation-inspired VR protocols will mitigate the lower mood, life satisfaction, and likelihood of depression.

Through exposure therapy, for example, VR can be utilized to create realistic and controlled environments where individuals can gradually confront situations that trigger anxiety or avoidance. By exposing individuals to these situations in a virtual setting, therapists can help clients develop more adaptive coping strategies and reduce anxiety. Another strategy is through role-playing and social skills training; VR environments can be used to facilitate role-playing exercises, helping individuals practice and improve social skills and interactions in a safe and non-threatening space.
