= Licensed behavior analyst =

Licensed behavioral health professional in the United States

A licensed behavior analyst is a type of applied behavior analysis practitioner in the United States. They have at least a master's degree, and sometimes a doctorate, in behavior analysis or a related field. Behavior analysts apply radical behaviorism to people. To become licensed, behavior analysts must not only complete graduate education, but also finish supervised fieldwork and pass a certification exam typically overseen by the Behavior Analyst Certification Board (BACB) or the Qualified Applied Behavior Analysis Credentialing Board (QABA).

== Defining the scope of practice ==
According to the Behavior Analyst Certification Board (BACB), behavior analysis is a scientific discipline concerned with understanding and improving behavior. Rooted in the philosophy of behaviorism, it emphasizes that efforts to improve the human condition are most effective when behavior itself is the focus of study and intervention. Research in this field has identified consistent relationships between behavior and environmental events, providing the foundation for applied behavior analysis (ABA). ABA practitioners use these principles to teach new skills and modify socially significant behaviors—such as communication, learning, and adaptive functioning—through evidence-based methods like positive reinforcement.

As the above suggests, behavior analysis is based on the principles of operant and respondent conditioning. This places behavior analysis as one of the dominant models of behavior management, behavioral engineering and behavior therapy. Behavior analysis is an active, environmental based approach and some behavior analytic procedures are considered highly restrictive (see least restrictive environment). For example, these service may make access to preferred items contingent on performance. This has led to abuses in the past, in particular where punishment programs have been involved. In addition, failure to be an independent profession often leads behavior analysts and other behavior modifiers to have their ethical codes supplanted by those of other professions. For example, a behavior analyst working in the hospital setting might design a token economy, a form of contingency management. He may desire to meet his ethical obligation to make the program habilitative and in the clients' best long-term interest. The physicians and nurses in the hospital who supervise him may decide that the token economy should instead create order in the nursing routines so clients get their medication quickly and efficiently. Instead of the ethical code of the BACB and the Association for Behavior Analysis International's position that those receiving treatment have a right to effective treatment and a right to effective education. In addition, failure on the part of a behavior analyst to adequately supervise their workers could lead to abuse. Finally, misrepresentations of the field and historical problems between academics has led to frequent calls to professionalize behavior analysis.

There is wide support within the profession for licensure.

=== Range of populations worked with ===
The professional practice of behavior analysis ranges from treatment of autistic and other developmentally disabled individuals to behavioral coaching and therapy. In addition to treatment of behavioral problems and corrections, the professional practice of behavior analysis includes organizational behavioral management, behavioral safety and even maintaining the behavioral health of astronauts while within and beyond Earth's orbit.

=== Certification ===
The BACB and QABA offers a technical certificate in behavior analysis. This certification is internationally recognized. This certification states the level of training and requires an exam to show a minimum level of competence to call oneself a board certified behavior analyst (BCBA). Certification came about because of many ethical issues with behavioral interventions being delivered including the use of aversive and humiliating treatments in the name of behavior modification. As of 2001, the American Board of Behavioral Psychology offered a diplomate (post PhD and licensed certification) in behavioral psychology.

=== The meaning of certification ===
BACB and the QABA are private organizations without governmental powers to regulate behavior analytic practice. While the BACB and QABA certifications mean that candidates have satisfied entry-level requirements in behavior analytic training, certificants may require a government license for independent practice when treating behavioral health or medical problems. Licensed certificants must operate within the scope of their license and must practice within their areas of expertise. Where the government regulates behavior analytic services unlicensed certificants must be supervised by a licensed professional and operate within the scope of their supervisor's license when treating disorders. Unlicensed certificants who provide behavior analytic training for educational or optimal performance purposes do not require licensed supervision. Where the government does not regulate the treatment of medical or psychological disorders certificants should practice in accord with the laws of their state, province, or country. All certificants must practice within their personal areas of expertise.

=== Licensure ===
Licensure's purpose is to protect the public from employing unqualified practitioners.

The model licensing act states that a person is a behavior analyst by training and experience. The person seeking licensure must have mastered behavior analysis by achieving a master's degree in behavior analysis or related subject matter. Like all other master level licensed professions (see counseling and licensed professional counselor) the model act sets the standard for a master's degree. This requirement states that the person has achieved textbook knowledge of behavior analysis which can be then tested through the exam offered by the Behavior Analyst Certification Board or the one offered by the QABA. It also requires an internship in which a behavior analysts works under another master or PhD level behavior analyst for a period of one year (750 hours) with at least two hours/week of supervision. Finally, those 750 hours are considered tutelage time. After that, the behavior analyst must engage in supervised practice under a behavior analyst for a period of another 2 years (2,000 hours).

Once this process is complete, the person applies to a state board who ensures that he or she has indeed met the above conditions. Once the person is licensed public protection is still monitored by the licensing board, which makes sure that the person receives sufficient ongoing education, and the licensing board investigates ethical complaints. A licensed behavior analyst would have equal training, knowledge, skills and abilities in their discipline as would a mental health counselor or marriage and family therapist in their discipline. In February 2008, Indiana, Arizona, Massachusetts, Vermont, Oklahoma and other states now have legislation pending to create licensure for behavior analysts. Pennsylvania was the first state in 2008 to license "behavior specialists" to cover behavior analysts. Arizona, less than three weeks later, became the first state to license "behavior analysts." Other states such as New York, Nevada and Wisconsin also have passed behavior analytic licensure.

== See also ==
- Professional practice of behavior analysis
