= Routine outcome measurement =

Approach for evaluating the effectiveness of psychotherapy

Routine outcome measurement (ROM), also known as routine outcome monitoring, refers to the systematic tracking of client progress during psychotherapy using a standardized self-report inventory or rating scale. Therapists administer brief outcome measures at regular intervals (e.g. each session or monthly) to quantify symptoms, functioning, or well-being. The goal is to use this feedback to inform treatment decisions, tailor interventions, and promptly address issues if a patient is not improving as expected.

== Effects on treatment ==
Research studies and literature reviews have examined the impact of routine outcome measurement on psychotherapy effectiveness. Overall, the evidence from literature reviews suggests that integrating ROM with feedback to clinicians can modestly improve treatment outcomes, with especially notable benefits for clients at risk of poor outcomes. For example, a 2012 systematic review of 45 randomized controlled trials covering psychotherapy in mental health settings reported generally positive effects of ROM with feedback.

== Frequently used outcome measures ==
A variety of standardized questionnaires are used for routine outcome measurement in psychotherapy. Five of the most frequently cited outcome measures include:

- Back Depression Inventory (BDI-II) – a 21-item self-report questionnaire assessing the severity of depressive symptoms. The BDI-II is often administered at intake and throughout therapy to gauge changes in mood. It is one of the most widely used instruments in both clinical practice and research for measuring depression.
- Symptom Checklist-90-R (SCL-90-R) – a broad-spectrum self-report inventory of 90 symptoms covering multiple psychological domains (such as depression, anxiety, paranoia, and somatic complaints). The SCL-90-R provides an overall index of psychological distress and several subscale scores. It is a widely used measure of general psychopathology to track overall symptom levels during treatment.
- Inventory of Interpersonal Problems (IIP) – a self-report instrument that identifies a person's predominant interpersonal difficulties (e.g. being too socially inhibited, too controlling, too self-sacrificing, etc.). The IIP is widely studied in the mental health field and commonly used in psychotherapy outcome research, especially for therapies focusing on relationship or personality issues. Changes in IIP scores can indicate improved interpersonal functioning as therapy progresses.
- Outcome Questionnaire 45 (OQ-45) – a 45-item self-report measure designed specifically for routine outcome tracking in psychotherapy. It assesses three domains: symptom distress, interpersonal relationships, and social role performance. The OQ-45 is intended to be administered at each session; software-assisted systems using the OQ-45 (such as OQ-Analyst) can graph client progress and signal when a client is off-track. A study published in 2025 analyzed data from 456 clients who took 5,917 sessions of low-fee online counseling at the Sentio Counseling Center and found "sessions where the therapist reviewed the client's OQ score beforehand (rather than after hand) showed significantly larger symptom improvement by the next session than sessions without such a review" and therapists "who reviewed client OQ scores more frequently before (rather than after) therapy sessions achieved faster client symptom recovery across all clients."
- Clinical Outcomes in Routine Evaluation – Outcome Measure (CORE-OM) – a 34-item self-report questionnaire measuring global distress and functioning. It was developed in the UK as a generic outcome measure for routine clinical use, covering well-being, problems/symptoms, life functioning, and risk. The CORE-OM is used both as an initial assessment and to track changes over the course of therapy. It has seen widespread adoption internationally, with translations in over 30 languages, reflecting its popularity as a routine outcome tool in various services.
