= Integrative behavioral couples therapy =

Behavioral marital therapy, sometimes called behavioral couples therapy, has its origins in behaviorism and is a form of behavior therapy. The theory is rooted in social learning theory and behavior analysis. As a model, it is constantly being revised as new research presents.

== History ==
Behavioral marital therapy started with simple research conducted on couples in the 1960s. Robert Weiss and Richard Stuart were the original authors of such research. In early 1970s Nathan Azrin published his concept of mutual reinforcement and reciprocity. Azrin stated that (1) human behavior is maintained by reinforcement on the person who performed the behavior (2) people have a tendency to treat others as they are treated and (3) mutual reinforcement accounts at least partially for concepts like friendships, joy, and love. Neil Jacobson pioneered the behavioral marital therapy approach. He published a book with Gayla Margolin, which launched a social learning model of couples therapy. In this model of therapy, partners learn to be nicer to each other through behavioral exchange (contingency contracts), communicate better and improve their conflict-resolution skills. Early support came when John Gottman found that as long as the ratio of positive to negative interactions remains at least five to one, the relationship is sturdy. When the ratio dips below there is a 94 percent chance that a couple will divorce. Other authors have found a role for exchanges as well. Behavioral marital therapy model remains the most researched model of family therapy and was found to be effective for treating marital discord and depression in women. Parts of the behavioral couples therapy model, in particular strategic use of the communication skills to reinforce drug abstinence and open dialogue about treatment, were introduced as a method for getting drug abusing partners into treatment, a method known as Community reinforcement approach and family training.

Early research suggested that the components of behavioral marital therapy worked as predicted. The social exchange component led to increases in marital satisfaction in the short run. The communication training program led couples to communicate better and produced more long term changes in contingencies between couple members.

Disillusionment with the traditional model began with a study in which it was found that only 50% of couples responded to the therapy. In addition, traditional couple therapy did not produce more significant outcomes compared to insight-oriented couple therapy.

== Development ==
Integrative behavioral couple therapy (IBCT) was developed by Neil S. Jacobson and Andrew Christensen. The model represents a return to contextualism, functional analysis and Skinner's distinction between contingency shaped and rule governed behavior. Integrative Behavioral Couple Therapy is "integrative" in at least two senses: First, it integrates the twin goals of acceptance and change as positive outcomes for couples in therapy. Couples who succeed in therapy usually make some concrete changes to accommodate the needs of the other but they also show greater emotional acceptance of the other. Second, IBCT integrates a variety of treatment strategies under a consistent behavioral theoretical framework. It is considered a third generation behavior therapy or sometimes called clinical behavior analysis.

Both the integrative and traditional behavioral couples therapy models have origins primarily in behaviorism. While traditional behavioral couples therapy has more roots in social learning principles and the later model in Skinnerian behaviorism. The latter model draws heavily on the use of functional analysis (psychology) and the Skinnerian distinction between contingency shaped and rule governed behavior to balance acceptance and change in the relationship.

== Overview ==
IBCT consists of two major phases, an evaluation/feedback phase and an active treatment phase. The first three sessions consist of an evaluation period where the therapist learns about the concerns of the couple. In the first session, the therapist usually sees both partners together, learns what brings the couple to therapy, and obtains a brief history of their relationship. The therapist may suggest couples read a self-help book during treatment that serves as a guideline for IBCT therapy. Also during this first session, the therapist normally gives each partner some questionnaires to complete and bring to their individual sessions, which are the next two sessions. In these individual sessions, the therapist explores each partner's relationship concerns and individual history. In the fourth session, the therapist sees both partners together for the "feedback session". The therapist may gather some final information in the beginning of the session, but most of the session is devoted to feedback from the therapist. In the fourth session, the therapist describes the couple's difficulties and strengths and how therapy will try to assist the couple. A major part of the feedback session is the therapist's formulation of the couple's problems, a conceptualization of the major themes in the couple's struggles, the understandable reasons why the couple has these struggles, how their efforts to resolve the struggles so often fail, and how therapy can help. The couple actively participates in this feedback, giving their reactions, adding information, and correcting the therapist's impressions as needed.

After the feedback session, the couple can make an informed decision about whether the therapist and treatment seem right for them. Assuming they decide positively, then the active phase of treatment begins. Sessions at this point are almost always done jointly, with both members of the couple and the therapist. The focus is often on important recent incidents, positive or negative, that reflect their major theme or themes. For example, if a major theme concerned partners' difficulties in achieving emotional intimacy, the couple might discuss a recent incident in which they were able to achieve a sense of closeness with each other or an incident in which one or both reached out to the other but felt rebuffed. Similarly, if a major theme involved frequent struggles over decision-making, they might discuss a recent incident where they were able to reach agreement on a matter or an incident where they got into a negative, escalating conflict about an issue on which they disagreed. Upcoming incidents related to a couple's theme, such as a difficult, upcoming decision that the couple must make, and broader issues related to a couple's theme, such as how partners in a couple who struggles to achieve emotional intimacy react when their feelings are hurt, are also a focus of discussion. In these discussions, the therapist is often quite active, helping the partners communicate more openly, directly, and clearly, helping them identify the patterns that get them stuck, and assisting them in finding alternative ways of interacting.

The standard protocol for IBCT therapy is described in a treatment manual written for therapists. This protocol includes 4 sessions for the assessment/feedback phase and an additional 20–22 sessions of active treatment. Typically, sessions are conducted every week and last just short of an hour. Toward the end of therapy, sessions are often spaced more widely; the typical course of therapy lasts between 6 and 12 months.

== Topics addressed ==
While traditional behavioral couples therapy focused heavily on change, integrative couples therapy attempted to balance change and acceptance. This is achieved through helping couples to better understand each other's learning history and to produce more contingency shaped changes in session and less rule governed changes for the couple. This is accomplished through therapist interventions such as turning the problem into something that happens to the couple. Some of the current research suggests that contingency shaped behavior is easier to maintain then rule governed behavior for couples. As to behavioral function, the greater the amount of escape /withdrawal behavior a couples members displays during demand situations the higher the amount of distress.

Integrative behavioral couples therapy addresses topics such as intimacy in couples relationships and forgiveness in couples.

A growing number of researchers are interested in the concept of behavioral momentum with couples. Couples seem to go through periods of ongoing improvement and other couples seem to go through periods of negative momentum. Theoretically, behaviorism has begun to focus more on romantic love.

== Efficacy compared to traditional behavioral couple therapy ==
Integrative behavioral couples therapy seems to work slower in producing change initially but has led to a 71% improvement rate in couples. In addition, Integrative behavioral couples therapy does not produce as much change as traditional behavioral couples therapy but it does produce more acceptance. At two years 69% of the Integrative behavioral couples therapy group appears to be doing better, while only 60% of the traditional group does better, while marital satisfaction was also in greater favor for the integrative behavioral couples therapy group. However, the traditional behavioral couples therapy group had a larger decline in negativity toward each other than did the integrative behavioral couples therapy group.

== Behavioral couples therapy after an affair ==
Overall the state of the research of couples being treated specifically for marital infidelity is in its infancy. One study, looked at 19 couples who had an affair. This study found that both traditional behavioral couples therapy and integrative behavioral couples therapy were effective in increasing intimacy after the affair was disclosed. The authors suggested that this is good news for couples. A greater reliance on behavioral conceptualizations of romantic love intimacy and forgiveness may be helpful in easing the pain of such difficult situations.

== Behavioral assessment of couples ==
Behavior analysis uses direct observation to determine the areas for intervention.

== Professional organizations ==
The Association for Behavioral and Cognitive Therapies (ABCT) has an annual conference where couple researchers and therapists can present their recent work in the field. The ABCT Couples Special Interest Group is part of ABCT and is composed of researchers whose focus is intimate relationships or clinicians whose focus is couple therapy.

The Association for Behavior Analysis International (ABA:I) has a special interest group in Behavioral Counseling which has many couples therapists. ABA:I has two conventions per year on in the U.S. and one Internationally. Couples researchers and therapists often present at these conferences.

The World Center for Behavior Analysis offers a certification in behavior therapy that covers Integrative Behavioral Couples Therapy.
