= Homework in psychotherapy =

Part of psychotherapy treatment

Homework in psychotherapy is sometimes assigned to patients as part of their treatment. In this context, homework assignments are introduced to practice skills taught in therapy, encourage patients to apply the skills they learned in therapy to real life situations, and to improve on specific problems encountered in treatment. For example, a patient with deficits in social skills may learn and rehearse proper social skills in one treatment session, then be asked to complete homework assignments before the next session that apply those newly learned skills (e.g., going to a social engagement or greeting five people each day).

Homework is most often used in cognitive behavioral therapy (CBT) for the treatment of mood and anxiety disorders, although other theoretical frameworks may also incorporate homework. Some of the types of homework used in CBT include thought records and behavioral experiments. Patients using thought records are instructed to write down negative cognitions on the thought record form and weigh the evidence both for and against the negative thoughts, with the goal being to come up with new, balanced thoughts in the process. Behavioral experiments are used as homework to help patients test out thoughts and beliefs directly. Studies have shown that homework completion and accuracy predict favorable outcomes in psychotherapy and may help patients stay in remission. However, some therapists are concerned that assigning homework makes therapy too formal and reduces the impact of the individual sessions.

== Approaches ==
Most of the literature published on homework in psychotherapy to date focuses on homework use during CBT, which involves changing patients' thoughts and behaviors to reduce the symptoms of the mental disorders from which they are suffering. A variety of homework assignments exist in CBT. These tasks can range from scheduling a daily exercise routine to practicing progressive muscle relaxation five times a day to monitoring and recording one's negative automatic thoughts throughout the day. In practice, these homework assignments are meant to help patients lift their mood, practice and master skills they developed in therapy, and progressively improve between treatment sessions. Research has found that homework compliance positively predicts successful outcomes in therapy, and therapists are now looking for better ways to implement homework, so that more individuals may receive its benefits.

CBT is not the only type of therapy to incorporate homework. Although each therapist makes his or her own choices regarding homework assignments, some of the other therapies that may assign homework include exposure therapy, psychodynamic therapy, and problem solving therapy. Homework can also be assigned even if therapists are not physically present with the patients being treated. Such cases include therapy delivered over the phone, over video, or over the Internet. Treatment of some disorders, such as major depression, may also be done without therapists at all. Although the efficacy of this self-help-like treatment is still under scrutiny, preliminary data suggest that completion of homework is one factor predicting positive treatment outcomes for patients who receive treatment over the Internet.

== Thought records ==
Thought records (or thought diaries) are among the most commonly used cognitive assignments in CBT. They allow patients in various situations to closely examine "hot thoughts" and cognitive distortions and, after having done so, arrive at a newly synthesized alternative thought that more closely fits the situation. Many thought records accomplish this task by having patients list out in order: the situation they are in; the emotions they are feeling and with what intensity those emotions are felt; what thoughts they are having and what the "hot thought" is; evidence for the hot thought; evidence against the "hot thought"; balanced alternative thoughts; and the emotions they feel after having completed the thought record and the intensity of those emotions.

=== Example ===
Jane has social anxiety disorder and was just told at work that she would be giving a presentation in front of an audience of 200 people the following week. This produces a large amount of anxiety for Jane, and she starts filling out a thought record to try to calm herself down. To begin, she fills in the column about the situation she is in with: "I was told that I am going to give a speech in front of a large audience next week." In the next column, Jane writes what emotions she is feeling and with what intensity she is feeling them: "Anxious – 100. Afraid – 90. Sad – 40." She then starts identifying some thoughts that immediately ran through her head when she heard that she would be giving the presentation: "Oh no, I'm going to mess up and choke. Everyone will laugh at me. My boss will fire me. I will never be able to hold a job at this rate. I'm worthless and a failure." Jane identifies "I'm worthless and a failure" as the hot thought, the thought that invokes the greatest amount of negative emotion in her situation.

After that, Jane starts writing in the next column the pieces of evidence that support the hot thought: "I've done terribly on presentations in the past. I remember one time in high school when I had to give a speech in front of my class and I ended up crying in front of everyone instead. I got a C on that speech and barely scraped by in the class. My high school friends and I don't talk as much anymore. They must be starting to get sick of me too. My co-workers don't try to talk to me either." Jane jots down in the next column pieces of evidence against her hot thought: "I think my boss might have meant well when he gave me this presentation assignment. I did one of these presentations on a smaller scale last week and I think I did just fine. Almost everyone who was there even came up to me and told me so afterwards. I think that those audience members do care about me and would be willing to support me if I asked. Also, I'm filling out this thought record just like my therapist told me to. I think that's what she would have wanted from me."

In the next column, Jane writes down her alternative thought: "The presentation ahead may be scary and making me feel anxious, but I think I can handle it as long as I know that there are people who support me." After that, Jane writes the emotions she is now feeling and their intensities: "Anxious – 50. Afraid – 40. Sad – 10. Relieved – 50."

=== Efficacy ===
Both the quality and quantity of thought records completed during therapy have been found to be predictive of treatment outcomes for patients with depression and/or an anxiety disorder. Furthermore, Rees, McEvoy, & Nathan (2005) found that accuracy ratings of patients' thought records mid-treatment was positively correlated with post-treatment outcomes, and that doing homework in CBT was overall preferable to not doing homework in CBT. Completing thought records accurately may also be indicative of overall skill gain in treatment; Neimeyer and Feixas (1990) found that patients with depression who completed thought records accurately were less likely to relapse six months after treatment termination. The researchers hypothesized that this was because the patients who completed thought records accurately had acquired the skills taught in CBT, and that these skills served as valuable coping strategies when the patients were faced with future stressors and needed to act as their own therapists.

== Behavioral experiments ==
Behavioral experiments are collaborative endeavors in which therapists and patients work together to identify a potentially negative or harmful belief, then to either confirm or disprove it by designing an experiment that tests the belief. Like thought records, they are most often used in CBT.

=== Example ===
Patients with panic disorder tend to interpret normal bodily sensations as signs of impending catastrophe. An individual with panic disorder may then believe that hyperventilation is a sign of an upcoming heart attack. A therapist who identifies this maladaptive thought can then work with the patient to test the belief with a behavioral experiment. To begin, the therapist and the patient would agree on a thought to test. In this case, it might be something like, "When I start hyperventilating, I will have a heart attack."

Then, the therapist may start giving suggestions on how to test the belief. She may suggest, "Why don't you try hyperventilating? If you show signs of having a heart attack, I have training in CPR and I'll be able to help you while waiting for the authorities." After some initial apprehension, the patient may agree with the experiment and start breathing in a hyperventilating pattern while the therapist watches. Since the patient with panic disorder most likely will not have a heart attack while hyperventilating, he will be less likely to believe in the original thought, even though he may have been scared of testing the belief at first.

=== Efficacy ===
Relative to thought records, behavioral experiments are thought to be better at changing an individual's beliefs and behaviors. To test this hypothesis, researchers conducted an experiment comparing the degree of belief and behavioral change in participants who were given either a thought record or a behavioral experiment intervention. Specifically, this study tested participants who endorsed the commonly held belief, "If I don't wash my hands after going to the restroom, I'll get sick." Participants in the thought record condition were given a "normal" thought record not unlike the one described in the "Thought Record" section of this article and asked to come up with evidence for and against the following belief: "Not washing your hands after going to the toilet will make you ill." After this, they were asked to reflect on their own experiences of washing or not washing their hands after going to the toilet and to come up with a balanced alternative belief.

In the behavioral experiment condition, participants worked with the experimenter to come up with a study to test the validity of the same belief used in the thought record condition. For example, one study could involve having the participant void without washing her hands afterwards to see if she would become ill. The participant was encouraged to concretely define how she would tell whether she became ill or not (e.g., check for fever, coughing, aches, or other common symptoms of illness) and to test her belief as thoroughly as possible (e.g., if the participant believed she was more likely to get ill after touching the toilet seat and not washing her hands, she was encouraged to test this hypothesis as well).

The researchers found that, compared to a no-treatment control, both thought records and behavioral experiments were effective in reducing the belief that not washing one's hands after going to the toilet would make oneself ill. However, behavioral experiments were found to be able to change the individuals' beliefs immediately following the intervention, while thought records demonstrated this ability to change belief only at follow-up one week after the intervention. On the other hand, the researchers found that neither thought records nor behavioral experiments were effective at reducing how often individuals actually washed their hands after using the toilet, even if they no longer believed that they would become ill for not washing their hands. Since the sample being studied was drawn from a normal population (as opposed to the population of individuals seeking treatment for psychological disorders), this lack of an effect on behavior may be due to the possibility that the people being studied were not under any motivation to actually change their behavior.

== Problems and uncertainties ==
Homework is generally associated with improved patient outcomes, but it is still uncertain what other factors may moderate or mediate the effects that homework has on how much patients improve. That is, some researchers have hypothesized that patients who are more motivated to complete homework are also more likely to improve; other researchers have suggested that only individuals with less severe psychopathologies are even capable of completing homework, so it would be effective only for a subset of individuals. To test these possibilities, Burns and Spengler (2000) used structural equation modeling to estimate the causal relations between homework compliance and depressive symptomatology before and after psychotherapy. These researchers found that "the data were consistent with the hypothesis that HW compliance had a causal effect on changes in depression, and the magnitude of this effect was large" (p. 46). Still, there may exist factors that improve homework compliance during therapy, such as general therapist competency and therapists' reviewing homework completed since the previous session.

The types of homework used in psychotherapy are not limited to thought records and behavioral experiments, which tend to be relatively structured in their implementation. In fact, even though researchers have found that psychotherapy with homework is generally more effective than psychotherapy without homework, there have not been many efforts to research if specific types of homework are better at effecting positive treatment outcomes than others, or if certain environments help promote the positive effects of homework. For example, Helbig-Lang and colleagues found that, in an environment where systematic homework assignment procedures were rare but where overall homework compliance remained high, homework compliance was not positively related to treatment outcomes. Another group of researchers looked at patients with depression who were in remission and undergoing maintenance therapy and found that homework compliance did not correlate with treatment outcomes in this sample, either. More research can help elucidate the relations among the types of homework used in psychotherapy, the environments in which they are incorporated, and treatment outcomes for patients with the various disorders for which the homework is being assigned.

== Future directions ==
Both clinicians and patients encounter difficulties in incorporating and complying to homework procedures throughout a treatment. Factors that have been found to be associated with homework compliance during treatment include having the therapist set concrete goals for completing the homework and involving the patient in discussions surrounding the assigned homework. If homework compliance is as important to treatment outcomes as most research suggest, however, then there is room for improvement and future studies could focus on how to improve compliance more effectively.

Like the psychotherapies in which they are incorporated, homework may not be effective at helping all people with all different kinds of psychological disorders. It is thus important to research for which disorders and in which general situations homework would enhance a therapy. This would ostensibly help patients being treated for psychological disorders receive more individualized care and support, and hopefully improve overall treatment outcomes for all disorders.

An example of a specific situation in which homework may be helpful is the mitigation of safety-seeking behaviors with behavioral experiments. Safety seeking behaviors are undertaken by individuals to prevent anticipated future catastrophes, but may end up being more harmful for these individuals in the long run. For example, a patient with panic disorder may avoid exercising because he believes that breathing heavily will make him have a panic attack. Because of the apparently preventative function of safety seeking behaviors, people who carry out these behaviors are unlikely to test their actual effectiveness in preventing catastrophes. So, designing behavioral experiments in therapy to test these behaviors could potentially be a helpful means for reducing their occurrence.

== See also ==
- Cognitive restructuring
