= Clinical behavior analysis =

Clinical application of behavior

Clinical behavior analysis (CBA; also called clinical behaviour analysis or third-generation behavior therapy) is the clinical application of applied behavior analysis (ABA). CBA represents a movement in behavior therapy away from methodological behaviorism and back toward radical behaviorism and the use of functional analytic models of verbal behavior—particularly, relational frame theory (RFT).

== Current models ==
Clinical behavior analysis (CBA) therapies include acceptance and commitment therapy (ACT), behavioral medicine (such as behavioral gerontology and pediatric feeding therapy), community reinforcement approach and family training (CRAFT), exposure therapies/desensitization (such as systematic desensitization), functional analytic psychotherapy (FAP, such as behavioral activation (BA) and integrative behavioral couples therapy), and voucher-based contingency management.

=== Acceptance and commitment therapy ===
Acceptance and commitment therapy is probably the most well-researched of all the third-generation behavior therapy models. Its development co-occurred with that of relational frame theory, with several researchers such as Steven C Hayes being involved with both. ACT has been argued to be based on relational frame theory. Although this is a matter of some debate within the community, Originally, this approach was referred to as comprehensive distancing. Every practitioner mixes acceptance with a commitment to one's values. These ingredients become enmeshed into the treatment in different ways which leads to ACT being either more on the mindfulness side, or more on the behavior-changing side. ACT has, as of May 2022, been evaluated in over 900 randomized clinical trials for a variety of client problems. Overall, when compared to other active treatments designed or known to be helpful, the effect size for ACT is a Cohen's d of around 0.6, which is considered a medium effect size.

=== Behavioral activation ===
Behavioral activation emerged from a component analysis of cognitive behavior therapy. Cognitive behavior therapy focuses on trying to reverse those negative thoughts that contribute to emotional difficulties such as depression and anxiety. This research found no additive effect for the cognitive component. Behavioral activation is based on a matching law model of reinforcement. A recent review of the research supports the notion that the use of behavioral activation is clinically important for the treatment of depression.

=== Community reinforcement approach and family training ===
Community reinforcement approach and family training (CRAFT) is a model developed by Robert Meyer and based on the community reinforcement approach (CRA) first developed by Nathan Azrin and Hunt. The model focuses on the use of functional behavioral assessment to reduce drinking behavior. CRAFT combines CRA with family therapy.

=== Functional analytic psychotherapy ===
Functional analytic psychotherapy is based on a functional analysis of the therapeutic relationship. It places a greater emphasis on the therapeutic context and returns to the use of in-session reinforcement. The basic FAP analysis utilizes what is called the clinically relevant behavior (CRB1), which is the client's presenting problem as presented in-session. Client in-session actions that improve their CRB1s are referred to as CRB2s. Client statements, or verbal behavior, about CRBs are referred to as CRB3s. In general, 40 years of research supports the idea that in-session reinforcement of behavior can lead to behavioral change.

=== Integrative behavioral couples therapy ===
Integrative behavioral couples therapy developed from dissatisfaction with traditional behavioral couples therapy. Integrative behavioral couples therapy looks to Skinner (1966) for the difference between contingency shaped and rule-governed behavior. It couples this analysis with a thorough functional assessment of the couples relationship. Recent efforts have used radical behavioral concepts to interpret a number of clinical phenomena including forgiveness.

== Clinical formulation ==
As with all behavior therapy, clinical behavior analysis relies on a functional analysis of problem behavior. Depending on the clinical model this analysis draws on B. F. Skinner's model of verbal behavior or relational frame theory.

== Professional organizations ==
The Association for Behavior Analysis International (ABAI) has a special interest group in clinical behavior analysis.

The Association for Behavioral and Cognitive Therapies (ABCT) also has an interest group in behavior analysis, which focuses on clinical behavior analysis.

The Association for Contextual Behavioral Science (ACBS) is devoted to third-generation therapies and basic research on derived relational responding and relational frame theory.

The Behavior Analyst Certification Board (BACB), in partnership with subject-matter experts, has produced a "Clinical Behavior Analysis" fact sheet.

== See also ==
- Behavioral psychotherapy
