= Matching law =

Quantitative relationship

In operant conditioning, the matching law is a quantitative relationship that holds between the relative rates of response and the relative rates of reinforcement in concurrent schedules of reinforcement. For example, if two response alternatives A and B are offered to an organism, the ratio of response rates to A and B equals the ratio of reinforcements yielded by each response. This law applies fairly well when non-human subjects are exposed to concurrent variable interval schedules (but see below); its applicability in other situations is less clear, depending on the assumptions made and the details of the experimental situation. The generality of applicability of the matching law is subject of current debate.

The matching law can be applied to situations involving a single response maintained by a single schedule of reinforcement if one assumes that alternative responses are always available to an organism, maintained by uncontrolled "extraneous" reinforcers. For example, an animal pressing a lever for food might pause for a drink of water.

The matching law was first formulated by R.J. Herrnstein (1961) following an experiment with pigeons on concurrent variable interval schedules. Pigeons were presented with two buttons in a Skinner box, each of which led to varying rates of food reward. The pigeons tended to peck the button that yielded the greater food reward more often than the other button, and the ratio of their rates to the two buttons matched the ratio of their rates of reward on the two buttons.

== Mathematical statement ==
If R_{1} and R_{2} are the rate of responses on two schedules that yield obtained (as distinct from programmed) rates of reinforcement Rf_{1} and Rf_{2}, the strict matching law holds that the relative response rate R_{1} / (R_{1} + R_{2}) matches, that is, equals, the relative reinforcement rate Rf_{1} / (Rf_{1} + Rf_{2}). That is,

$$\frac{R_1}{R_1+R_2}=\frac{Rf_1}{Rf_1+Rf_2}$$

This relationship can also be stated in terms of response and reinforcement ratios:

$$\frac{R_1}{R_2}=\frac{Rf_1}{Rf_2}$$

Alternatively stated, it states that there exists a constant $C$ for an individual animal, such that
$$\frac{R_i}{Rf_i}=C$$
for any $i$. That is, for an individual animal, the rate of response is proportional to rate of reinforcement for any task.

== Deviations from matching, and the generalized matching law ==
A recent review by McDowell reveals that Herrnstein's original equation fails to accurately describe concurrent-schedule data under a substantial range of conditions. Three deviations from matching have been observed: undermatching, overmatching, and bias. Undermatching means that the response proportions are less extreme than the law predicts. Undermatching can happen if subjects too often switch between the two response options, a tendency that may be strengthened by reinforcers that happen to occur just after a subject switches. A changeover delay may be used to reduce the effectiveness of such post-switch reinforcers; typically, this is a 1.5 second interval after a switch when no reinforcer is presented. Overmatching is the opposite of undermatching, and is less common. Here the subjects response proportions are more extreme than reinforcement proportions. Overmatching may occur if there is a penalty for switching. A final deviation is bias, which occurs when subjects spend more time on one alternative than the matching equation predicts. This may happen if a subject prefers a certain environment, area in a laboratory, or method of responding.

These failures of the matching law have led to the development of the "generalized matching law", which has parameters that reflect the deviations just described. This law is a power function generalization of the strict matching (Baum, 1974), and it has been found to fit a wide variety of matching data.

$$\frac{R_1}{R_2}=b\left(\frac{Rf_1}{Rf_2}\right)^s$$

This is more conveniently expressed in logarithmic form

$$\log\left(\frac{R_1}{R_2}\right)=\log\left(b\right)+s\cdot\log\left(\frac{Rf_1}{Rf_2}\right)$$

The constants b and s are referred to as "bias" and "sensitivity" respectively. "Bias" reflects any tendency the subject may have to prefer one response over the other. "Sensitivity" reflects the degree to which the reinforcement ratio actually impacts the choice ratio. When this equation is plotted, the result is straight line; sensitivity changes the slope and bias changes the intercept of this line.

The generalized matching law accounts for high proportions of the variance in most experiments on concurrent variable interval schedules in non-humans. Values of b often depend on details of the experiment set up, but values of s are consistently found to be around 0.8, whereas the value required for strict matching would be 1.0. The concurrent VI VI choice situation involves strong negative feedbacks: the longer the subject refrains from responding to an alternative, the higher his probability of payoff: switching is encouraged.

== Processes underlying the distribution of responses ==
There are three ideas on how humans and animals maximize reinforcement, molecular maximizing, molar maximizing and melioration.

- molecular maximizing: organisms always choose whichever response alternative is most likely to be reinforced at the time.
- molar maximizing: organisms distribute their responses among various alternatives so as to maximize the amount of reinforcement they earn over the long run.
- melioration: literally means to "make better"; organisms respond so as to improve the local rates of reinforcement for response alternatives. behavior keeps shifting towards the better of two alternatives until ratios are equal-which makes matching.

== Theoretical importance ==
The matching law is theoretically important for several reasons. First, it offers a simple quantification of behavior that can be applied to a number of situations. Secondly, offers a lawful account of choice. As Herrnstein (1970) expressed it, under an operant analysis, choice is nothing but behavior set into the context of other behavior. The matching law thus challenges the idea that choice is an unpredictable outcome of free will, just as B.F. Skinner and others have argued. However this challenge becomes serious only if it applies to human behavior, as well as to the behavior of pigeons and other animals. When human participants perform under concurrent schedules of reinforcement, matching has been observed in some experiments, but wide deviations from matching have been found in others. Finally, if nothing else, the matching law is important because it has generated a great deal of research that has widened our understanding of operant control.

== Relevance to psychopathology ==
The matching law, and the generalized matching law, have helped behavior analysts to understand some complex human behaviors, especially the behavior of children in certain conflict situations. James Snyder and colleague have found that response matching predicts the use of conflict tactics by children and parents during conflict bouts. This matching rate predicts future arrests. Even children's use of deviant talk appears to follow a matching pattern.
