= Peggilee Wupperman =

- Occupation: Professor of Psychology
- Title: Ph.D.

Academic background
- Education: University of Texas, Dallas (BA) University of North Texas (MS, PhD)

Academic work
- Discipline: Clinical Psychology
- Institutions: John Jay College/CUNY Graduate Center & Yale University
- Website: http://www.mindfulnessandmodificationtherapy.com

Peggilee Wupperman, Ph.D., is a professor of psychology at John Jay College/CUNY Graduate Center, an assistant clinical professor at Yale University School of Medicine, and a licensed psychologist in New York. She is best known for developing Mindfulness and Modification Therapy (MMT), which seeks to address and treat dysfunctional behaviors in individuals.

== Education ==
Dr. Wupperman graduated summa cum laude with her Bachelor of Science degree in psychology from the University of Texas, Dallas, in August 2001. While there, she was under the guidance of Dr. Karen Prater in the Hobson Wildenthal Honors College and conducted research under Dr. Marion Underwood. She completed her Master of Science in psychology and Ph.D. in clinical psychology in 2003 and 2006, respectively, from the University of North Texas. During her time at the University of North Texas, Craig S. Neumann served as Dr. Wupperman's advisor and oversaw her doctoral dissertation. Her dissertation suggests the connection between mindfulness and its aid in decreasing symptoms related to borderline personality disorder. Dr. Wupperman completed a predoctoral fellowship at Yale University School of Medicine's Yale New Haven Psychiatric Hospital from July 2005 to June 2006, at which time she began her year-long post-doctoral fellowship at the University of Washington with Dr. Marsha Linehan.

== Career ==
In July 2007, Dr. Wupperman returned to the Yale University School of Medicine's Psychiatry Department for her fellowship, and after a year, was promoted to associate research scientist and supervisor. There, she taught a graduate and post-graduate course related to mindfulness-based treatments in response to trauma. In August 2009, she became an assistant professor at Yale University and also joined the faculty at John Jay College of Criminal Justice as a professor and chair of the Addiction Studies Program. Dr. Wupperman founded the Mindfulness and Modification Therapy research team at John Jay College in September 2009 and is still the director. In 2013, Dr. Wupperman became a tenured associate professor and director of practicum training for the John Jay College clinical psychology doctoral program. She also sat on both the departmental and college-wide diversity committees, ensuring that diversity, equity, and inclusion are upheld on campus. Beginning in 2022, Dr. Wupperman ended her role as director of practicum training and became a professor of psychology. She has taught courses related to substance use disorders, psychology of gender, psychopathology, therapy interventions, and mindfulness and modification therapy for students at the undergraduate, masters, and doctoral levels at John Jay College and Yale University. Dr. Wupperman also sees therapy clients at the American Institute for Cognitive Therapy and through clinical trials of Mindfulness and Modification Therapy.

== Research ==
Dr. Wupperman's main research focus is on understanding and treating emotion and behavior dysregulation, primarily through mindfulness and modification therapy (MMT). However, her broader areas of expertise include trauma and abuse, substance use, sexual violence, and aggression. MMT brings together features of acceptance and commitment therapy, dialectical behavior therapy, motivational interviewing, and other practices to help patients separate themselves from their uncontrolled and unmanaged behaviors. After the completion of four grant-funded clinical trials, MMT is showing significant results in the treatment of aggressive behaviors, substance use disorders, binge eating, trichotillomania, and anger. Based on information gathered through her research, Dr. Wupperman wrote ten articles in a series called Beyond Self-Destructive Behavior for Psychology Today between 2016 and 2020. Dr. Wupperman has also been invited to present at many conferences around the world and also to conduct workshops and seminars for mental health professionals and other groups. In the summer of 2024, Dr. Wupperman presented at the 7th Annual CEYou! conference on the time and cost saving qualities of MMT, which can specifically benefit people with impulsive and addictive behaviors that may not have engaged and participated fully with previous interventions. Wupperman has conducted research on mindfulness for the treatment of destructive behavior that has led to over 30 publications that have been cited over 5,000 times.

=== Relevant publications ===
Dr. Wupperman's first published article, "Reconstruing the 'Reconstruction' of Psychopathy: A Comment on Cooke, Michie, Hart, and Clark", was published in 2005, the year before she completed her doctorate. From 2005 to 2024, Dr. Wupperman has published a total of 36 articles and one book and been cited over 5,000 times. Her most relevant articles include "Depressive Symptoms as A Function of Sex-Role, Rumination, and Neuroticism" and "Do Deficits in Mindfulness Underlie Borderline Personality Features and Core Difficulties?", which were initially written as her master's level thesis and doctoral dissertation, respectively. Also among this list of most relevant and cited articles are those written about the use of mindfulness and modification therapy in specific populations: aggressive substance users and people with serious mental illness who use illegal drugs while on methadone

In 2019, Dr. Wupperman published a book entitled Treating Impulsive, Addictive, and Self-Destructive Behaviors: Mindfulness and Modification Therapy. This book offers time and cost-efficient ways for people to separate themselves from their dysregulated behavior and thinking, like eating disorders, aggression, anger, and unhealthy spending habits.

Emily R. Edwards graduated from John Jay College in 2019 with a Doctorate in Clinical Psychology, Master degree in Philosophy and Forensic Psychology following her Bachelor of Science in Psychology in 2013. During her time as a Doctorate student, Edwards was a co-author with Dr. Wupperman on multiple research publications. Edwards has conducted research on emotional regulation and mental health primarily in veterans. This has led to over 60 publications in the last 10 years that have been cited over 1,000 times. Many of Wuppermans publications were also co-authored by Matthias Berking who has over 400 publications and over 26,000 citations. Berking has been included in the chair of clinical psychology and psychotherapy at the Friedrich-Alexander University Erlangen-Nuremberg in Germany since 2014. Berkings research has a focus on regulation of emotion and much of this plays into Wuppermans research in their collaborative publications.

== Selected honors and recognitions ==
Dr. Wupperman joined Phi Kappa Phi Honor Society in 2002, but is no longer a member. During the 2004–2005 school year, she received the Bonney Honor Student in Psychology Award, which recognizes graduate students who perform well academically and show a strong commitment to their community through acts of service, from the University of North Texas. In 2014, Dr. Wupperman was awarded the Faculty Scholarly Excellence Award for notable scholarly contributions. The University of Texas, Dallas awarded Dr. Wupperman the Buhrmester Rising Star Alumni Award in 2016 for demonstrating "outstanding early-career accomplishment" since receiving her bachelor's degree. Dr. Wupperman's book Treating Impulsive, Addictive, and Self-Destructive Behaviors: Mindfulness and Modification Therapy was chosen Book of the Year: Psychiatric and Mental Health Nursing by the American Journal of Nursing in 2019. In 2021, Dr. Wupperman was awarded fellow status by the Association for Behavioral and Cognitive Therapy. Fellow status denotes "members who are recognized by a group of their pers for distinguished, outstanding, and sustained accomplishments that are above and beyond the expectations of their existing professional role."

== Community service ==
Outside of her career as a professor, researcher, and clinician, Dr. Wupperman is an active member of numerous social justice campaigns. From 2007 to 2013, she was a consultant for ReThink BPD, a facilitator and consultant for Family Connections, a conference committee member for Yale University's 4th and 5th Annual Borderline Personality Disorder Conferences, and a long-distance supervision faculty member at the University of Washington. Currently, Dr. Wupperman donates her time to provide therapy training and supervision to clinicians who see low-income marginalized therapy clients.
