= Self-as-context =

Principle in ACT therapy

Self-as-context, one of the core principles in acceptance and commitment therapy (ACT), is the concept that people are not the content of their thoughts or feelings, but rather are the consciousness experiencing or observing the thoughts and feelings. Self-as-context is distinguished from self-as-content, defined in ACT as the social scripts people maintain about who they are and how they operate in the world. A related concept is decentering, which is a central change strategy of mindfulness-based cognitive therapy, is defined as a process of stepping outside of one’s own mental events leading to an objective and non-judging stance towards the self.

== Buddhist influence ==
Buddhist mindfulness practices, in conjunction with functional contextualism, deeply influenced the formation of ACT and its concept of self-as-context. The approach was originally called comprehensive distancing and was developed in the late 1980s by Steven C. Hayes, Kelly G. Wilson, and Kirk D. Strosahl.

== Self-as-context vs. self-as-content ==
To differentiate self-as-context from self-as-content, ACT presents the conceptual self (participant), the thinking self (participant observer), and the observational self (observer).

=== Conceptual self ===
The conceptual self is a person's self-as-content. A personal narrative, the conceptual self includes objective facts (name, age, sex, cultural background, marital status, occupation, etc.), subjective details (likes, dislikes, hopes, fears, and perceived strengths and weaknesses), social roles (friend, spouse, parent, child), and gender roles (mother, father, daughter, son). When a person "holds" their conceptual self lightly then their identity construct is adaptable, however, should a person become unable to differentiate themselves from the rules and restrictions comprising their conceptual self then, according to ACT, they may struggle in different areas of their life. Examples include saying things like "I wish I could, but I'm not the sort of person to _____" or "I'm a strong person, I don't need any help."

=== Thinking self ===
The thinking self is the inner monologue actively assessing, questioning, judging, reasoning, and rationalizing any given moment, situation, or behavior. The relationship between the participant and participant-observer is described in Russ Harris' The Happiness Trap (2007) as being like that of an actor and director:

Out of an entire lifetime of experience—literally hundreds of thousands of hours of archival "film footage"—our thinking self selects a few dramatic memories, edits them together with some related judgments and opinions, and turns it into a powerful documentary, entitled "This Is Who I Am!" And the problem is, when we watch that documentary we forget that it's just a heavily edited video. Instead, we believe that we are that video! But in the same way that a documentary of Africa is not Africa, a documentary of you is not you.

=== Observational self ===
The observational self is defined in ACT as a transcendent state of self-awareness accessible through mindful expansion of awareness. In ACT cognitive defusion exercises are utilized to demonstrate how thoughts have no literal power over action, thereby increasing mental flexibility. If someone thinks "I am the worst," for example, a cognitive defusion exercise would observe "I am having the thought that I am the worst." Other exercises demonstrating how thoughts have no actual power include saying "I can't walk and talk" while proceeding to walk and talk, or saying "I have to stand up" while remaining seated. Experientially, the observational self is the part of consciousness that hears one's inner voice, and sees images in the mind's eye. ACT presents the idea that the more practiced a person is at accessing their observational self, the easier it is to perceive emotions within their situational context, remain mentally flexible, and commit to value congruent action.

== Additions to self-as-content ==
=== Somatic self ===
Self-as-content also includes the nonverbal sense of self experienced through physiological responses, including instinct, attraction, repulsion, and emotional affect. In ACT for Gender Identity: The Comprehensive Guide, Alex Stitt differentiates the somatic self from the thinking self and says that a person's relationship with their body begins to develop before their inner monologue. Since gender is more than just a thought, and identity is often described in "felt" terms, the somatic self accounts for the sense of "resonance" and "dissonance" either attracting or repelling people to certain aspects of gender and gender expression. Unlike the observational self, which is able to step back and see self-as-context, the somatic self can be as unreliable as the thinking self. Examples of this include when a person's physiological fear response is triggered in moments of safety, when a person is in a dissociative state, or when a person's affect is incongruent with their content of speech.

== See also ==
- Metacognitive therapy
- Metacognition
- Relational frame theory
