= Implicit Relational Assessment Procedure =

Computer-based psychological measure

- Synonyms: IRAP
- Purpose: measure of implicit attitude

The Implicit Relational Assessment Procedure (IRAP) is a computer-based psychological measure. It was heavily influenced by the implicit-association test, and is one of several tasks referred to as indirect measures of implicit attitudes. The IRAP is one of relatively few indirect measures that can includes relational or propositional rather than associative information. The IRAP was conceptualised by Dermot Barnes-Holmes, and originally published in 2006. A meta analysis of clinically-relevant criterion effects suggest that the IRAP has good validity. However, a second meta analysis suggests that it has poor reliability, like many reaction time based measures. Research using the IRAP is often linked to relational frame theory, a functional-analytic theory of language.

== Application and use ==
=== Procedure ===
A computer-based measure, the IRAP requires individuals to accurately and quickly respond to the relation between two stimuli presented on screen (e.g., to "dog" and "woof") using one of two response options (e.g., "similar" and "different"). Across pairs of blocks, individuals must respond using two contrasting response patterns, for example "dog-woof-similar" versus "dog-woof-different". Reaction times are then compared between these blocks. Any difference in response time between the two block types is defined as an IRAP effect. According to the creators, "the basic hypothesis is that average response latencies should be shorter across blocks of consistent relative to inconsistent trials. In other words, participants should respond more rapidly to relational tasks that reflect their current beliefs than to tasks that do not".

=== Implementations ===
The IRAP was first implemented in Visual Basic 6, and distributed for free for academic use but under a closed source by Dermot Barnes-Holmes. A multi-platform, open-source implementation written in PsychoPy is also available on the Open Science Framework.

== See also ==
- Implicit association test
