= J. Gayle Beck =

American clinical psychologist

- Occupation: Professor of Psychology
- Awards: Florence Halpern Award for Distinguished Professional Contributions to Clinical Psychology (2016), Distinguished Scientific Contributions to Clinical Psychology (2023)

Academic background
- Education: Brown University; State University of New York at Albany

J. Gayle Beck is a licensed clinical psychologist who specializes in trauma stress disorders and anxiety disorders. She is the Lillian and Morrie Moss Chair of Excellence Emerita in the Department of Psychology at the University of Memphis and holds a part-time research position at the University of Michigan.

Beck was President of the Society of Clinical Psychology, American Psychological Association (APA) Division 12, in 2012 and President of the Association for Behavioral and Cognitive Therapies in 2004-2005. She served as a member of the Board of the American Psychological Foundation and as Editor in Chief of Clinical Psychology: Science and Practice.

== Awards ==
Beck was elected a Fellow of the APA Division 12 (Society of Clinical Psychology), APA Division 38 (Society for Health Psychology), and APA Division 56 (Trauma Psychology). She received the APA Florence Halpern Award for Distinguished Professional Contributions to Clinical Psychology from the Society of Clinical Psychology in 2016.

== Biography ==
Beck received an A.B. in Psychology and Education from Brown University in 1979. She subsequently completed a Ph.D. in Clinical Psychology State University of New York at Albany in 1984, with support from a Presidential fellowship from the State University of New York (1979-1982). Her dissertation titled "The effect of performance demand and attentional focus on sexual responding in functional and dysfunctional men," was supervised by David H. Barlow.

Beck held faculty positions at the University of Houston (1984-1993) and the State University of New York, Buffalo (1993-2007) before moving to the University of Memphis in 2008. Beck's clinical research on post-traumatic stress disorder (PTSD) has been funded by grants from the National Institute for Mental Health. She led a multi-site randomized controlled trial evaluating the effectiveness of group cognitive behavioral therapy in the treatment of PTSD among veterans. Beck is Director of the Athena Project at the University of Memphis, which provides free services, resources, and support for victims of domestic abuse.

== Book ==
- Rosen, R. C., & Beck, J. G. (1988). Patterns of sexual arousal: Psychophysiological processes and clinical applications. Guilford Press.

== Representative research ==
- Beck, J. G., Bozman, A. W., & Qualtrough, T. (1991). The experience of sexual desire: Psychological correlates in a college sample. Journal of Sex Research, 28(3), 443-456.
- Beck, J. G., Coffey, S. F., Palyo, S. A., Gudmundsdottir, B., Miller, L. M., & Colder, C. R. (2004). Psychometric properties of the Posttraumatic Cognitions Inventory (PTCI): a replication with motor vehicle accident survivors. Psychological Assessment, 16(3), 289-298.
- Beck, J. G., Grant, D. M., Read, J. P., Clapp, J. D., Coffey, S. F., Miller, L. M., & Palyo, S. A. (2008). The Impact of Event Scale-Revised: Psychometric properties in a sample of motor vehicle accident survivors. Journal of Anxiety Disorders, 22(2), 187-198.
- Beck, J. G., McNiff, J., Clapp, J. D., Olsen, S. A., Avery, M. L., & Hagewood, J. H. (2011). Exploring negative emotion in women experiencing intimate partner violence: Shame, guilt, and PTSD. Behavior Therapy, 42(4), 740-750.
- Beck, J. G., Palyo, S. A., Winer, E. H., Schwagler, B. E., & Ang, E. J. (2007). Virtual reality exposure therapy for PTSD symptoms after a road accident: An uncontrolled case series. Behavior Therapy, 38(1), 39-48.
