= Frock Me! =

Frock Me! is an exhibition that specialises in vintage fashion. Frock Me! was created in 1997 and takes place in Chelsea, London and in Kensington, London. Frock Me! has been influential on modern fashion trends with many buyers from High Street fashion stores sourcing inspiration for their designs and patterns from this event. The name Frock Me! was coined by founder Matthew Adams, who studied theatrical costume design at Central School of Art.

== Sources ==
- Kate Finnigan - The Telegraph, Stella Magazine. "One Careful Lady Owner"
- Christa Weil - It's Vintage, Darling!: How to be a Clothes Connoisseur. Hodder & Stoughton. 21 Sep 2006. ISBN 978-0-340-92275-0
- Funmi Odulate - Shopping for Vintage Quadrille Publishing Ltd. 1 Feb 2008. ISBN 978-1-84400-590-1
