= Expressive suppression =

Willful curtailing of emotional visage

Expressive suppression is defined as the intentional reduction of the facial expression of an emotion. It is a component of emotion regulation.

Expressive suppression is a concept "based on individuals' emotion knowledge, which includes knowledge about the causes of emotion, about their bodily sensations and expressive behavior, and about the possible means of modifying them" In other words, expressive suppression signifies the act of masking facial giveaways (see facial expression) to hide an underlying emotional state (see affect). Simply suppressing the facial expressions that accompany certain emotions can affect "the individual's experience of emotion" According to a 1974 study done by Kopel and Arkowitz, repressing the facial expressions associated with pain decreased the experience of pain in participants. However, "there is little evidence that the suppression of spontaneous emotional expression leads to a decrease in emotional experience and physiological arousal apart from the manipulation of the pain expressions".

According to Gross and Levenson's 1993 study in which subjects watched a disgusting film while suppressing or not suppressing their expressions, suppression produced increased blinking. However, suppression also produced a decreased heart rate in participants and self-reports did not reflect that suppression affected the disgust experience. While it is unclear from Gross and Levenson's study whether suppression successfully diminishes the experience of emotions, it can be concluded that expressive suppression does not completely inhibit all facial movements and expressions (e.g. blinking of the eyes). Niedenthal argues that expressive suppression works to decrease the experience of positive emotions whereas it does not successfully decrease the experience of negative emotions.

It may be that expressive suppression serves more of a social purpose than it serves a purpose for the individual. In a study done by Kleck and colleagues in 1976, participants were told to suppress facial expressions of pain during the reception of electric shocks. Specifically, "in one study the subjects were induced to exaggerate or minimize their facial expressions to fool a supposed audience". This idea of covering up an internal experience in front of observers could be the true reason that expressive suppression is utilized in social situations. "In everyday life, suppression may serve to conform individuals' outward appearance to emotional norms in a given situation, and to facilitate social interaction". In this way, hiding negative emotions may cause more successful social relationships by preventing conflict, stifling the spread of negative emotions, and protecting an individual from negative judgments made by others.

== Component ==
Expressive suppression is a response-focused emotion regulation strategy. This strategy involves an individual voluntarily suppressing their outward emotional expressions. Expressive suppression has a direct relationship to our emotional experiences and is significant in communication studies. Individuals who suppress their emotions seek to control their actions and maintain a positive social image. Expressive suppression involves reducing facial expression and controlling positive and negative feelings of emotion. This type of emotion regulation strategy can have negative emotional and psychological effects on individuals. Emotional suppression reduces expressive behavior significantly. As many researchers have concluded, though emotional suppression decreases outward expressive emotions, it does not decrease our negative feelings and emotional arousal.

Different forms of emotional regulation affect our response trajectory of emotions. We target situations for regulation by the process of selecting the situations we are exposed to or by modifying the situation we are in. Emotion suppression relates to the behavioral component of emotion. Expressive suppression has physiological influences such as decreasing heart rate, increasing blood pressure, and increasing sympathetic activation.

Expressive suppression requires self-control. We use self-control when handling our emotion-based expressions in public. It is believed that the use of expressive suppression has a negative connection with a human's well-being. Expressive suppression has been found to occur late after the peripheral physiological response or emotion process is triggered. Künh et al. (2011) compare this strategy to vetoing actions. This type of emotion regulation strategy is considered a method that strongly resists various urges and voluntarily inhibits actions. Kühn et al. (2011) also posited the notion that expression suppression may be internally controlled and that emotional responses are targeted by suppression efforts.

One of the characteristics of expressive suppression, a response-based strategy, is that it occurs after an activated response. Larsen et al. (2013) claim expressive suppression to be one of the less effective emotion regulation strategies. These researchers label expressive suppression as an inhibition of the behavioral display of emotion.

== Externalizers vs. Internalizers ==
Regarding emotion regulation, specifically expressive suppression, two groups can be characterized by their different response patterns. These two groups are labeled externalizers and internalizers. Internalizers generally "show more skin conductance deflections and greater heart rate acceleration than do externalizers" when attempting to suppress facial expressions during a potentially emotional event. This signifies that internalizers can successfully employ expressive suppression while experiencing physiological arousal. However, when asked to describe their feelings, internalizers do not usually speak about themselves or specific feelings, which could be a sign of alexithymia. Alexithymia is defined as the inability to verbally explain an emotional experience or a feeling. Peter Sifneos first used this word in the realm of psychiatry in 1972 and it means "having no words for emotions". Those who can consistently suppress their facial expressions (e.g. internalizers) may be experiencing symptoms of alexithymia. On the other hand, externalizers employ less expressive suppression in response to emotional experiences or other external stimuli and do not usually struggle with alexithymia.

== Gender differences ==
Men and women do not equally utilize expressive suppression. Typically, men show less facial expression and employ more expressive suppression than women do. This behavior difference rooted in gender differences can be traced back to social norms that are taught to children at a young age. At a young age, boys are implicitly taught that having emotional reactions makes them weak, which is a lesson that encourages the suppression of emotional behavior in masculine individuals. This suppression is a result of "the punishment and consequent conditioned inhibition of all expression of a given emotion". If a masculine individual expresses an undesirable emotion and society responds by punishing that behavior, that masculine individual will learn to suppress the socially unacceptable behavior. On the other hand, feminine individuals do not experience the same societal pressure to the same extent to suppress their emotional expressions. Because feminine individuals are not as pressured to keep their emotions concealed, most do not feel the need to suppress them. However, there are exceptions.

== Vs. display rules ==
Complete expressive suppression means that no facial expressions are visible to exemplify a given emotion. However, display rules are examples of a controlled form of expression management and "involve the learned manipulation of facial expression to agree with cultural conventions and interpersonal expectations in the pursuit of tactical and/or strategic social ends" The utilization of display rules differs from expressive suppression because when display rules are enacted, the action to manage expression is voluntary, controlled, and incorporates certain types of expressive behavior. Conversely, expressive suppression is involuntary and is the result of social pressures that shape subconscious behaviors. It is not a controlled action nor does expressive suppression involve the manipulation of voluntary expressions, it is only manifested in the absence of expression. There are three ways in which facial expression displays may be influenced: modulation, qualification, and falsification. Modulation refers to the act of showing a different amount of expression than one feels. Qualification requires the addition of an extra (unfelt) emotional expression to the expression of felt emotion. Lastly, falsification has three separate components. Falsification incorporates expressing an unfelt emotion (simulation), expressing no emotion when an emotion is felt (neutralization), or concealing a felt emotion by expressing an unfelt emotion (masking).

== A response-focused strategy ==
Expressive suppression is an emotion management strategy that works to decrease positive emotional experiences. However, it has not been proven to reduce the experience of negative emotions. This strategy is a response-focused form of emotion regulation, which "refers to things we do once an emotion is underway and response tendencies have already been generated". Response-focused strategies are generally not as successful as antecedent-focused regulation strategies, which refers to "things we do, either consciously or automatically, before emotion-response tendencies have become fully activated". Srivastava and colleagues performed a study in 2009 in which the effectiveness of students' use of expressive suppression was analyzed in the transition period between high school and college. This study concluded that "suppression is an antecedent of poor social functioning" in the domains of social support, closeness, and social satisfaction.

== Psychological consequences ==
Suppressing the expression of emotion is one of the most frequent emotion-regulation strategies utilized by human beings. Clinical traditions state that a person's psychological health is based upon how affective impulses are regulated; the consequences of affective regulation have become the main focus of psychological researchers. The psychological consequences directly related to expressive suppression are frequently disputed. Some early 20th-century researchers state that suppressing a physical emotional response while emotionally aroused will increase the emotional experience due to concentration on suppressing that emotion. These researchers argue that common sense tells us emotions become more severe the longer they are bottled up. Other researchers dispute this theory, saying that emotional expression is so significant to the overall emotional response that when suppression occurs, all other responses (e.g. physiological) are weakened. These researchers solidify this argument with the tradition that people are taught to count to ten when emotionally aroused to calm themselves down. If suppressing emotions were to increase the emotional experience, this counting exercise would only intensify a person's reactions. However, it has been deemed to do the opposite. Unfortunately, few studies have been carried out to test these hypotheses. The idea that people have conflicting views on what is better - to bottle up emotions by counting to ten before acting/speaking or to release emotions as bottling them up is bad for your mental health - is of constant interest to researchers in the field of emotion. These differing views on such commonplace human behavior suggest that expressive suppression is one of the more complicated emotion-regulation techniques.

As a solution to these opposing ideas, it has been suggested (and mentioned in the Externalizers vs. Internalizers section above) that people tend to be either emotionally expressive (externalizers) or inexpressive (internalizers). The habitual use of one expressive technique over the other leads to different psychological and physiological consequences over time. Expressive behavior is directly related to emotional suppression as it is assumed that internalizers consciously choose not to express themselves. However, this assumption has gone primarily untested except for a 1979 study by Notarius and Levenson, whose research found that internalizers are more physiologically reactive to emotional stimuli than externalizers. One explanation for these findings was that when a behavioral emotional response is suppressed it must be released in other ways, in this case, physiological reactions. These findings lend themselves to the suggestion by Cannon (1927) and Jones (1935) that emotional suppression intensifies other reactions.

It has also been suggested that illness and disease are increased by continued emotional suppression, especially the suppression of intensely aggressive emotions such as anger and hostility which can lead to hypertension and coronary heart-disease. As well as physical illness, expressive suppression is said to be the cause of mental illnesses such as depression. Many psychotherapists will try to relieve their patients' illness/strain by teaching them expressive techniques in a controlled environment or within the particular relationship in which their suppressed emotions are causing problems. A counter-argument to this idea suggests that expressive suppression is an important part of emotional regulation that needs to be learned due to its beneficial use in adulthood. Adults must learn to successfully suppress certain emotional responses (e.g. those to anger which could have destructive social consequences). However, then the question is whether or not to suppress all anger-related responses or to release those less volatile ones to reduce the risk of contracting physical and mental illnesses. The Clinical Theory implies that there is an optimum level between total suppression and total expression which, during adulthood, a person must find to protect their physical and psychological being.

While expressive suppression may be socially acceptable in certain situations, it cannot be considered a healthy practice at all times. Concealing and suppressing expressions can cause stress-related physiological reactions. Stress occurs because "the social disapproval and punishment of overt emotional expression that causes suppression are itself intimidating and stressful". There are several occupations that require the suppression of positive or negative emotions, such as estate agents masking their happiness when an offer is placed on a house to maintain their professionalism, or elementary-school teachers suppressing their anger to not upset their young students when teaching them right from wrong. Only in recent studies have researchers begun looking into the effects that continual suppression of emotion in the workplace has on people. Continual suppression causes strain on those utilizing it, especially on those who may be natural externalizers. Strain elicited by such suppression can cause an elevated heart rate, increased Anxiety, low commitment, and other effects which can be detrimental to an employee. The common conception is that expressive suppression in the workplace is beneficial for the organization and dangerous for the employee over long periods. However, in a 2005 study, Cote found that factors contributing to the social dynamics of emotions determine when emotion regulation increases, decreases, or does not affect strain at all. The suppression of unpleasant emotions such as anger contributes to increasing high levels of strain.

== Expressive Suppression in Adolescents ==
While it is thought that the way that a child is parented is crucial in determining whether or not they will develop tendencies to internalize their problems, "...mechanisms linking parental practices to adolescents’ internalizing problems remain poorly understood. "A potential pathway connecting parental behaviors to internalizing problems could be through adolescent expressive suppression". As children age into adolescents, their brain structure changes in the regions and systems of the brain "that are considered pivotal for the regulation of behavior and emotion, and for the perception and evaluation of risk and reward". During adolescence, especially in mid-to-late adolescence, internalizing behavior increases. These significant changes can trigger vulnerability in adolescents, leading to mental health problems.

== Link with depression ==
Expressive suppression, as an emotion regulation strategy, serves different purposes such as supporting goal pursuits and satisfying hedonic needs. Though expressive suppression is considered a weak influence on the experience of emotion, it has other functions. Expressive suppression is a goal-oriented strategy that is guided by people's beliefs and potentially by abstract theories about emotion regulation. In a 2012 study by Larsen and colleagues, the researchers looked at the positive association between expressive suppression and depressive symptoms among adults and adolescents which are influenced by parental support and peer victimization. They found a reciprocal relationship between parental support and depressive symptoms. The same was not true for the relationship between peer victimization and depressive symptoms. Depressive symptoms followed decreased perception of parental support one year later. They found that initial suppression occurred after increases in depressive symptoms one year later, yet depression did not occur after suppression.

However, in a continuation of their original study, Larsen and colleagues found that this relationship between suppression and depression was reversed. Depressive symptoms occurred after the use of suppression, and suppression did not occur after future depressive symptoms. The authors of this study support that expressive suppression has physiological, social, and cognitive costs. Some evidence says that "depressed people judge their negative emotions as less socially acceptable" than non-depressed people. "Appraising one's emotions as unacceptable mediates the relationship between negative emotion intensity and use of suppression".

== Negative social consequences ==
An appropriate level of expressive suppression is vital for physiological and psychological health. However, excessive use of expressive suppression can negatively affect social interactions. While expressive suppression may seem like an easier way of coping with emotions in society or of becoming more likable in a social environment, it alters behavior in a way that is visible and undesirable to others. The act of suppressing facial expressions prohibits others in the social world from gaining information about a suppressor's emotional state. This can prevent a suppressor from receiving social-emotional benefits such as sympathy or sharing in collective positive and negative emotions that "facilitate social bonding". Secondly, expressive suppression is not always fully successful. If a suppressor accidentally shows signs of concealed feelings, others may perceive that the suppressor is covering up true emotions and may assume that the suppressor is insincere and uninterested in forming legitimate social relationships. Lastly, expressive suppression is hard work and therefore requires more cognitive processing than freely communicating emotions. If a suppressor is unable to devote full attention to social interactions because they are using cognitive power to suppress, the suppressor will not be able to remain engaged nor put in the work to maintain relationships.

== See also ==
- Anorectic – Drug that reduces appetite
- Apatheia – Stoic concept of being undisturbed by passions
- Ataraxia – Concept in Hellenistic philosophy
- Crystallized self
- Experiential avoidance – Attempts to avoid internal experiences
- Face (sociological concept) – Class of behaviors and customs
- Honne and tatemae – Japanese concept of true feelings vs. public behavior
- Nirodha – Renunciation of desire in Buddhism
- Repression (psychology) – Unconscious defense mechanism
- Role playing – Changing of one's behaviour to assume a role
- True self and false self – Psychological concepts often used in connection with narcissism
- Thought suppression – Conscious effort to discontinue a thought
