= Dermot Barnes-Holmes =

Irish psychologist

Dermot Barnes-Holmes (born 1963) is a Professor of psychology at the School of Psychology, Ulster University and was Foundation Professor at the Department of Psychology at National University of Ireland, Maynooth. He is known for an analysis of human language and cognition through the development of Relational Frame Theory with Steven C. Hayes, and its application in various psychological settings. He was the world's most prolific author in the experimental analysis of human behaviour between the years 1980 and 1999. He was awarded the Don Hake Basic/Applied Research Award at the 2012 American Psychological Association Conference in Orlando, Florida. He is a past president and fellow of the Association for Contextual Behavioral Science, is a recipient of the Quad-L Lecture Award from the University of New Mexico and most recently became an Odysseus laureate of the Flemish Science Foundation and a fellow of the Association for Behavior Analysis International. In 2015 he accepted a life-time senior professorship at Ghent University in Belgium. He originally conceptualized and programmed the Implicit Relational Assessment Procedure (IRAP).

== IRAP ==
The Implicit Relational Assessment Procedure (IRAP) is an implicit measure similar to the Implicit Association Test (IAT), with the key difference being that it measures specific relations between stimuli rather than general associations. It has its theoretical basis in Relational Frame Theory.

== Publications (selection) ==
- Hayes, S. C., Barnes-Holmes, D., & Roche, B. (Eds.). (2001). Relational Frame Theory: A Post-Skinnerian account of human language and cognition. New York: Plenum Press. ISBN 0-306-46600-7
- Hayes, S. C., Bond, F. W., Barnes-Holmes, D., Austin, J. (Eds.) (2006). Acceptance and mindfulness at work: Applying acceptance and commitment therapy and relational frame theory to organisational behaviour management. New York: Haworth Press.
- Carpenter, KM; Martinez, D; Vadhan, NP; Barnes-Holmes, D; Nunes, EV (March 2012). "Measures of attentional bias and relational responding are associated with behavioral treatment outcome for cocaine dependence". Am J Drug Alcohol Abuse. 38: 146–54. doi:10.3109/00952990.2011.643986. PMC 3433234. PMID 22220556.
- Vahey, N.; Boles, S.; Barnes-Holmes, D. (2010). "Measuring adolescents' smoking-related social identity preferences with the Implicit Relational Assessment Procedure (IRAP) for the first time: A starting point that explains later IRAP evolutions". International Journal of Psychology and Psychological Therapy. 10: 453–474.
- Dawson, D.L.; Barnes-Holmes, D.; Gresswell, D.M.; Hart, A.J.; Gore, N.J. (2009). "Assessing the Implicit Beliefs of Sexual Offenders Using the Implicit Relational Assessment Procedure: A First Study". Sexual Abuse: A Journal of Research and Treatment. 21: 57–75.
- Blackledge, J. T. & Barnes-Holmes, D. (2009). Core processes in acceptance and commitment therapy. In J. T. Blackledge, J. Ciarrochi, & F. P. Deane (Eds.), Acceptance and commitment therapy: Contemporary theory, research and practice (pp. 41–58). Bowen Hills, QLD, Australia: Australian Academic Press.
- Barnes-Holmes, D.; Luciano, C.; Barnes-Holmes, Y. (2004). "Relational frame theory: Definitions, controversies, and applications I.". Special issue of the International Journal of Psychology and Psychological Therapy. 4: 177–394.
- Barnes-Holmes, D.; Luciano, C.; Barnes-Holmes, Y. (2004). "Relational frame theory: Definitions, controversies, and applications II". Special issue of the International Journal of Psychology and Psychological Therapy. 4: 443–622.
- Lyddy, F.; Barnes-Holmes, D.; Hampson, P. J. (2001). "A transfer of sequence function via equivalence in a connectionist network". The Psychological Record. 51: 409–428.
- Barnes-Holmes, D.; Barnes-Holmes, Y.; Cullinan, V. (2000). "Relational frame theory and Skinner's Verbal Behavior: A possible synthesis". The Behavior Analyst. 23: 69–84.
- Barnes-Holmes, D.; Dymond, S.; Roche, B.; Grey, I. (1999). "Language and cognition". The Psychologist. 12: 500–504.
- Gomez, S.; Huerta, F.; Barnes-Holmes, D.; Luciano, C. (1999). "Breaking equivalence relations". Experimental Analysis of Human Behavior Bulletin. 17: 1–4.
- Barnes, D (1997). "Conceptual and philosophical issues in behavioral psychology. Special issue of". The Psychological Record. 47: 527–660.

== See also ==
- Relational Frame Theory
- Experimental analysis of behaviour
