= Thought suppression =

Conscious effort to discontinue a thought

Thought suppression is a psychoanalytical defense mechanism. It is a type of motivated forgetting in which an individual consciously attempts to stop thinking about a particular thought. It is often associated with obsessive–compulsive disorder (OCD). OCD is when a person will repeatedly (usually unsuccessfully) attempt to prevent or "neutralize" intrusive distressing thoughts centered on one or more obsessions. It is also thought to be a cause of memory inhibition, as shown by research using the think/no think paradigm. Thought suppression is relevant to both mental and behavioral levels, possibly leading to effects which intensify the intrusive thought, which is contrary to the intention. Ironic process theory is one cognitive model that can explain the paradoxical effect.

When an individual tries to suppress thoughts under a high cognitive load, the frequency of those thoughts increases and becomes more accessible than before. Evidence shows that people can prevent their thoughts from being translated into behavior when self-monitoring is high; this does not apply to automatic behaviors though, and may result in latent, unconscious actions. This phenomenon is made paradoxically worse by increasing the amount of distractions a person has, although the experiments in this area can be criticized for using impersonal concurrent tasks, which may or may not properly reflect natural processes or individual differences.

== Empirical work, 1980s ==
In order for thought suppression and its effectiveness to be studied, researchers have had to find methods of recording the processes going on in the mind. One experiment designed with this purpose was performed by Wegner, Schneider, Carter & White. They asked participants to avoid thinking of a specific target (e.g. a white bear) for five minutes, but if they did, they were told then to ring a bell. After this, participants were told that for the next five minutes they were to think about the target. There was evidence that unwanted thoughts occurred more frequently in those who used thought suppression compared to those who were not. Furthermore, there was also evidence that during the second stage, those who had used thought suppression had a higher frequency of target thoughts than did those who hadn't used thought suppression; later coined the rebound effect. This effect has been replicated and can even be done with implausible targets, such as the thought of a "green rabbit". From these implications, Wegner eventually developed the "ironic process theory".

== Improved methodology, 1990s ==
To better elucidate the findings of thought suppression, several studies have changed the target thought. Roemer and Borkovec found that participants who suppressed anxious or depressing thoughts showed a significant rebound effect. Furthermore, Wenzlaff, Wegner, & Roper demonstrated that anxious or depressed subjects were less likely to suppress negative, unwanted thoughts. Despite Rassin, Merkelbach and Muris reporting that this finding is moderately robust in the literature, some studies were unable to replicate results. However, this may be explained by a consideration of individual differences.

Recent research found that for individuals with low anxiety and high desirability traits (repressors), suppressed anxious autobiographical events initially intruded fewer times than in other groups (low, high, and high defensive anxious groups). However, after seven days it was found that repressors experienced more intrusive thoughts regarding those anxious autobiographical events than the other groups, thus demonstrating that repression works for the short run, but is not sustainable. This difference in coping style may account for the disparities within the literature. That said, the problem remains that the cause of the paradoxical effect may be in the thought tapping measures used (e.g. bell ringing). Evidence from Brown (1990) that showed participants were very sensitive to frequency information prompted Clarke, Ball and Pape to obtain participants' aposterio estimates of the number of intrusive target thoughts and found the same pattern of paradoxical results. However, even though such a method appears to overcome the problem, it and all the other methodologies use self-report as the primary form of data-collection. This may be problematic because of response distortion or inaccuracy in self-reporting.

== Behavioral domain ==
Thought suppression also has the capability to change human behavior. Macrae, Bodenhausen, Milne, and Jetten found that when people were asked not to think about the stereotypes of a certain group (e.g. a "skinhead"), their written descriptions about a group member's typical day contained less stereotypical thoughts. However, when they were told they were going to meet an individual they had just written about, those in the suppression group sat significantly farther away from the "skinhead" (just by virtue of his clothes being present). These results show that even though there may have been an initial enhancement of the stereotype, where participants were able to prevent this from being communicated in their writing; this was not true for their behavior.

Further experiments have documented similar findings. In one study from 1993, when participants were given cognitively demanding concurrent tasks, the results showed a paradoxical higher frequency of target thoughts than controls. However other controlled studies have not shown such effects. For example, Wenzlaff and Bates found that subjects concentrating on a positive task experienced neither paradoxical effects nor rebound effects—even when challenged with cognitive load. Wenzlaff and Bates also note that the beneficiality of concentration in their study participants was optimized when the subjects employed positive thoughts.

Some studies have shown that when test subjects are under what Wegner refers to as a "cognitive load" (for instance, using multiple external distractions to try to suppress a target thought), the effectiveness of thought suppression appears to be reduced. However, in other studies in which focused distraction is used, long term effectiveness may improve. That is, successful suppression may involve less distractors. For example, in 1987 Wegner, Schneider, Carter & White found that a single, pre-determined distracter (e.g., a red Volkswagen) was sufficient to eliminate the paradoxical effect post-testing. Evidence from Bowers and Woody in 1996 is supportive of the finding that hypnotized individuals produce no paradoxical effects. This rests on the assumption that deliberate "distracter activity" is bypassed in such an activity.

== Cognitive dynamics ==
When the cognitive load is increased, thought suppression typically becomes less effective. For example, in the white bear experiment, many general distractions in the environment (for instance a lamp, a light bulb, a desk etc.) might later serve as reminders of the object being suppressed (these are also referred to as "free distraction"). Some studies, however, are unable to find this effect for emotional thoughts in hypnotized individuals when one focused distraction is provided. In an attempt to account for these findings, a number of theorists have produced cognitive models of thought suppression. Wegner suggested in 1989 that individuals distract themselves using environmental items. Later, these items become retrieval cues for the thought attempting to be suppressed (i.e. "environmental cueing theory"). This iterative process leaves the individual surrounded by retrieval cues, ultimately causing the rebound effect. Wegner hypothesized that multiple retrieval cues not being forged explains, in part, the effectiveness of focused distraction (i.e., a reduction of mental load). This is because there may be an ideal balance between the two processes; if the cognitive demand that isn't too heavy, then the monitoring processes won't supersede it.

Individual differences may also play a role in regards to the ironic thought process.

Thought suppression has been seen as a form of "experiential avoidance". Experiential avoidance is when an individual attempts to suppress, change, or control unwanted internal experiences (thoughts, feelings, bodily sensations, memories, etc.). This line of thinking supports relational frame theory.

== Other methodologies ==
Thought suppression has been shown to be a cause of inhibition in several ways. Two commonly used methods to study this relationship are the list method and the item method. In this list method, participants study two lists of words, one after the other. After studying the first list, some participants are told to forget everything that they have just learned, while others are not given this instruction. After studying both lists, participants are asked to recall the words on both lists. These experiments typically find that participants who were told to forget the first list do not remember as many words from that list, suggesting that they have been suppressed due to the instruction to forget. In the item method, participants study individual words rather than lists. After each word is shown, participants are told to either remember or forget the word. As in experiments using the list method, the words followed by the instruction to forget are more poorly remembered. Some researchers believe that these two methods result in different types of forgetting. According to these researchers, the list method results in inhibition of the forgotten words, but the item method results in some words being remembered better than the others, without a specific relation to forgetting.

=== Think/no think paradigm ===
A paradigm from 2009 to study how suppression relates to inhibition is the think/no think paradigm. In these experiments, participants study pairs of words. An example of a possible word pair is roach-ordeal. After all the word pairs are learned, the participants see the first word of the pair and are either told to think about the second word (think phase) or not to think about the second word (no think phase). The no think phase is when suppression occurs. Some pairs were never presented after the initial study portion of the study, and these trials serve as the control group. At the end of the experiment, the participants try to remember all of the word pairs based on the first word. Studies could also use the "independent probe" method, which gives the category and first letter of the second word of the pair. Typically, regardless of the method used, results show that the no-think trials result in worse memory than the think trials, which supports the idea that suppression leads to inhibition in memory. Although this methodology was first done using word pairs, experiments have been conducted using pictures and autobiographical memories as stimuli, with the same results.

Research has also shown that doing difficult counting tasks at the same time as a think/no think task leads to less forgetting in the no think condition, which suggests that suppression takes active mental energy to be successful. Furthermore, the most forgetting during the no think phase occurs when there is a medium amount of brain activation while learning the words. The words are never learned if there is too little activation, and the association between the two words is too strong to be suppressed during the no think phase if there is too much activation. However, with medium activation, the word pairs are learned but able to be suppressed during the no think phase.

fMRI studies have shown two distinct patterns of brain activity during suppression tasks. The first is that there is less activity in the hippocampus, the brain area responsible for forming memories. The second is an increase of brain activity in the dorsolateral prefrontal cortex, especially in cases where suppression is harder. Researchers think that this region works to prevent memory formation by preventing the hippocampus from working.

This methodology can also be used to study thought substitution by adding an instruction during the no think phase for participants to think of a different word rather than the word being suppressed. This research shows that thought substitution can lead to increased levels of forgetting compared to suppression without a thought substitution instruction. This research also suggests that thought substitution, while used as a suppression strategy during the no think phase, may work differently than suppression. Some researchers argue that thinking of something different during the no think phase forms a new association with the first word than the original word pair, which results in interference when using this strategy, which is different than the inhibition that results from simply not thinking about something.

== Dream influence ==
Dreams occur mainly during the rapid eye movement (REM) sleep and are composed of images, ideas, emotions, and sensations. Although more research needs to be done on this subject, dreams are said to be linked to the unconscious mind. Thought suppression has an influence on the subject matter of the unconscious mind and by trying to restrain particular thoughts, there is a high chance of them showing up in one's dreams.

=== Ironic control theory ===
Ironic control theory, also known as "ironic process theory", states that thought suppression "leads to an increased occurrence of the suppressed content in waking states". The irony lies in the fact that although people try not to think about a particular subject, there is a high probability that it will appear in one's dreams regardless. There is a difference for individuals who have a higher tendency of suppression; they are more prone to psychopathological responses such as "intrusive thoughts, including depression, anxiety and obsessional thinking". Due to these individuals having higher instances of thought suppression, they experience dream rebound more often.

Cognitive load also plays a role in ironic control theory. Studies have shown that a greater cognitive load results in an increased possibility of dream rebound occurring. In other words, when one tries to retain a heavy load of information before going to sleep, there is a high chance of that information manifesting itself within the dream. There is a greater degree of dream rebound in those with a higher cognitive load opposed to those whose load was absent. With the enhancement of a high cognitive load, ironic control theory states thought suppression is more likely to occur and lead to dream rebound.

=== Dream rebound ===
Dream rebound is when suppressed thoughts manifest themselves in one's dreams. Self-control is a form of thought suppression and when one dreams, that suppressed item has a higher chance of appearing in the dream. For example, when an individual is attempting to quit smoking, they may dream about themselves smoking a cigarette. Emotion suppression has also been found to trigger dream rebound. Recurrence of emotional experiences act as presleep suggestions, ultimately leading to the suppressed thoughts presenting themselves within the dream. One effecting factor of dream rebound is the changes in the prefrontal lobes during rapid-eye movement sleep. Suppressed thoughts are more accessible during REM sleep, as a result of operating processes having a diminished effectiveness. This leads to presleep thoughts becoming more available "with an increased activity of searching for these suppressed thought[s]". There are other hypotheses regarding REM sleep and dream rebound. For instance, weak semantic associations, post REM sleep, are more accessible than any other time due to weak ironic monitoring processes becoming stronger. More research is needed to further understand what exactly causes dream rebound.

== See also ==
- Affect regulation
- Agnotology
- Experiential avoidance
- Expressive suppression
- Meditation
- Postponement of affect
- Psychological trauma
- Self-censorship
- The Game
- Trauma trigger
- Turning a blind eye
- Willful ignorance
