= Contempt =

Disgust and anger towards something or someone

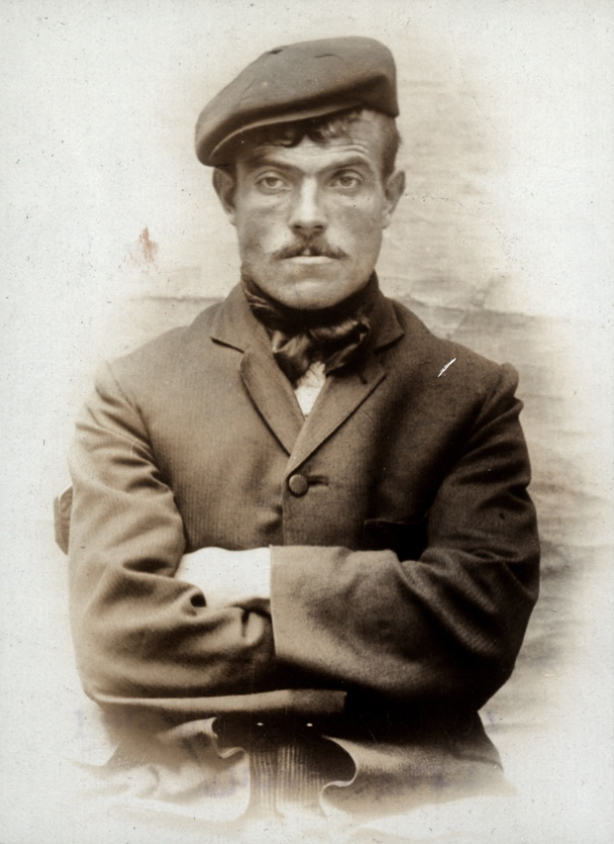
This picture of Thomas Ward, arrested for stealing a gold sovereign, can be seen as showing contempt.

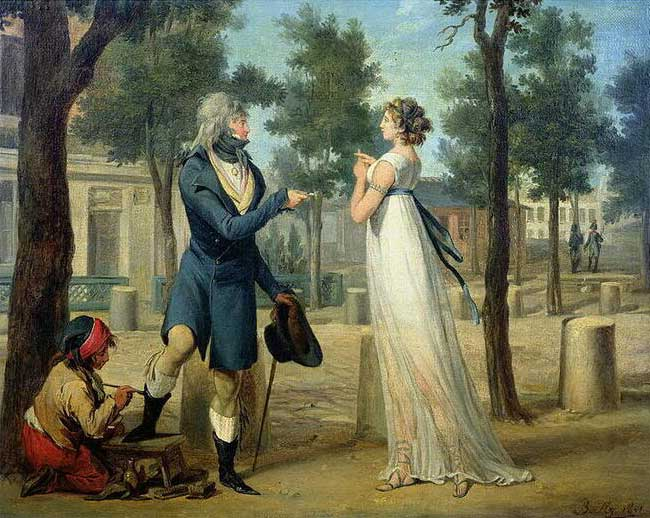
A painting by Louis-Léopold Boilly (ca. 1797). The woman has been interpreted as a prostitute (who is disdaining the inadequate coin proffered by the fashionable gentleman getting his shoes shined at left).

In colloquial usage, contempt usually refers to either the act of despising, or having a general lack of respect for something. This set of emotions generally produces maladaptive behaviour. Other authors define contempt as a negative emotion rather than the constellation of mentality and feelings that produce an attitude. Paul Ekman categorises contempt as the seventh basic emotion, along with anger, disgust, fear, happiness, sadness and surprise. Robert C. Solomon places contempt on the same emotional continuum as resentment and anger, and he argues that the differences between the three are that resentment is anger directed towards a higher-status individual; anger is directed towards an equal-status individual; and contempt is anger directed towards a lower-status individual.

== Etymology ==
The term originated in 1393 in Old French from the Latin word contemptus meaning "scorn". It is the past participle of contemnere and from con- intensive prefix + temnere "to slight, scorn"; contemptuous appeared in 1529.

== Cultural context ==
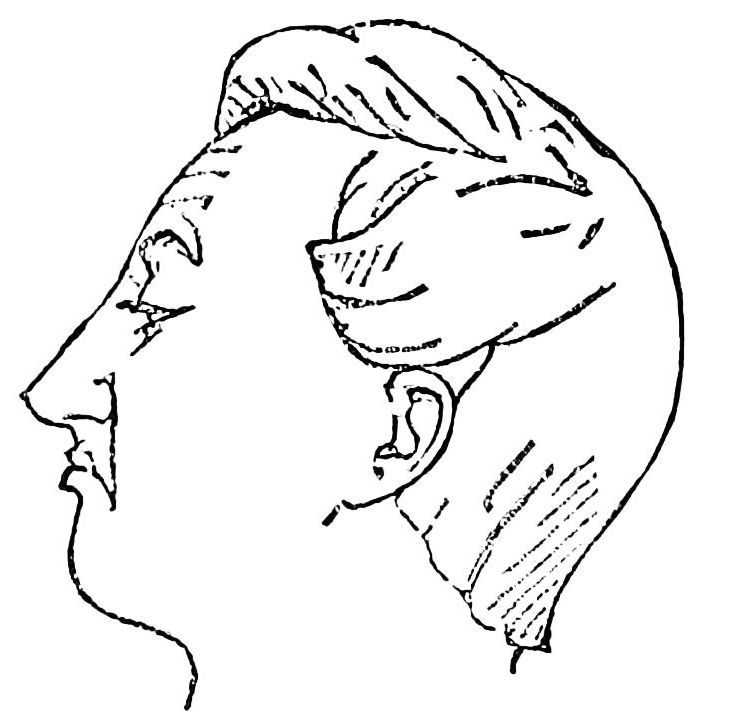
Facial expression of contempt

Ekman and Friesen (1986) identified a specific facial expression that observers in ten different cultures, both Western and non-Western, agreed signaled contempt. In this study, residents of West Sumatra, Indonesia, viewed photos of American, Japanese, and Indonesian people. Their ability to classify some facial expressions as contempt versus the primary emotions of anger, disgust, happiness, sadness, fear, or surprise showed that across cultures, general contempt is universally understood (with level of agreement equating to 75%). "An expression in which the corner of the lip is tightened and raised slightly on one side of the face (or much more strongly on one side than the other) signaled contempt." This study showed that contempt, as well as the outward expression of contempt, can be pointed out across Western and Non-Western peoples when contrasted with other primary emotions.

In American English the use of the word "contempt" has declined since the early 19th century, while in the 21st century the word "disrespect" has become relatively more common.

== Characteristics ==
Paul Ekman, a widely recognized psychologist, found six emotions that were universally recognized: anger, disgust, fear, joy, sadness, and surprise. Findings on contempt are less clear, though there is at least some preliminary evidence that this emotion and its expression are universally recognized.

In the 1990s, Ekman proposed an expanded list of emotions, this time including contempt.

== Defining features ==
Contempt has five features. Contempt requires a judgment concerning the appearance or standing of the object of contempt. In particular, contempt involves the judgment that, because of some moral or personal failing or defect, the contemned person has compromised his or her standing vis-à-vis an interpersonal standard that the contemptor treats as important. This may have not been done deliberately but by a lack of status. This lack of status may cause the contemptuous to classify the object of contempt as utterly worthless, or as not fully meeting a particular interpersonal standard. Therefore, contempt is a response to a perceived failure to meet an interpersonal standard. Contempt is also a particular way of regarding or attending to the object of contempt, and this form of regard has an unpleasant affective element. Contempt may be experienced as a highly visceral emotion similar to disgust, or as cool disregard.

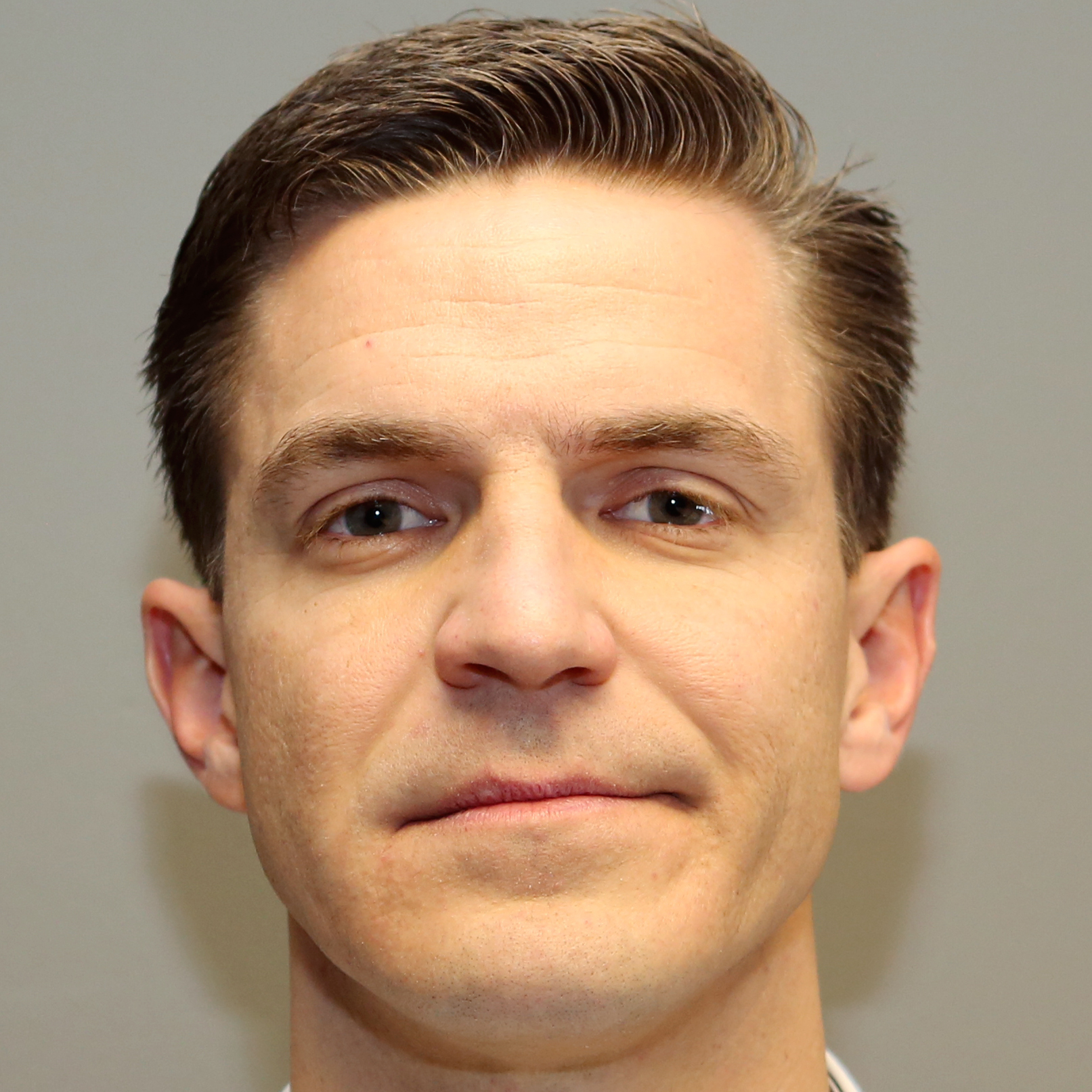
Facial expression showing subtle contempt

Contempt has a certain comparative element. In David Hume's studies of contempt, he suggests that contempt essentially requires apprehending the "bad qualities" of someone "as they really are" while simultaneously making a comparison between this person and ourselves. Because of this reflexive element, contempt also involves what we might term a "positive self-feeling" of the contemptuous. A characteristic of contempt is the psychological withdrawal or distance one typically feels regarding the object of one's contempt. This psychological distancing is an essential way of expressing one's nonidentification with the object of one's contempt and it precludes sympathetic identification with the object of contempt. (Hume, 2002, 251) Contempt for a person involves a way of negatively and comparatively regarding or attending to someone who has not fully lived up to an interpersonal standard that the person extending contempt thinks is important. This form of regard constitutes a psychological withdrawal from the object of contempt.

== Virtues ==
Contempt can serve a useful purpose in a moral community. An ethics of contempt provides a much larger breadth of answers than other competing systems of ethics, whether they be based on ethics of actions (judging actions by their rightness or wrongness) or ethics of feelings (e.g., ethics of resentment). By feeling contempt for those things which are found to be unethical, immoral, or morally unsavory, one can show that they are bad and remove them from the moral community.

== Response ==
The main response of contempt lies within "publicized expression of low regard for the objects held in contempt" (Miller, C.H., 2005). By this reasoning, a person holding contempt would not have the urge to openly confront the person with whom they are at odds, nor would they themselves try to remove the object of contempt; rather, one who holds contempt would have the tendency to hold the view that others should remove the object of contempt, or hold the view that the object of contempt should remove itself. So while one would make their feelings known to others, the person with contempt would not necessarily want to directly deal with the situation at hand. One who is experiencing contempt would exhibit negative affective behaviors that may be labeled as "cold" – this simply meaning that one who is experiencing the emotion of contempt would tend to alienate those responsible.

== Contempt in relationships ==
=== Gender differences ===
Men and women act differently when displaying contempt in same-sex relationships. Not only do girls engage in more non-verbal forms of social aggression than boys do, girls dissembled more than boys do, speaking nicely but making mean faces. In the research provided by Underwood (2004) in their laboratory observation studies where they watch girls and boys in an identical social context in which best friends respond to a provoking newcomer, gender differences emerge not for the verbal behaviours, but for the nonverbal expressions of disdain and contempt (which are so glaring that they were observed with high degrees of inter-coder reliability by both women and men, kappa's exceeding .8; Underwood et al., 2003).

There are several reasons why girls can be especially prone to conveying anger and contempt by nonverbal forms of social exclusion. One reason may be that girls are socialized from infancy onward to be overtly nice and conciliatory and do so to avoid conflict whenever possible, for fear of being excluded from relationships, disliked, or punished (for reviews, see Brown and Gilligan, 1993; Underwood, 2003; Zahn-Waxler, 2000). Non-verbal forms of social exclusion may be a highly effective way to harm someone with relatively few social consequences; the hurtful act is fleeting, can often be executed behind the victim's back and outside of the watchful eyes of adults, and, even if caught, mean faces are typically not punished. Second, girls may hurt one another via non-verbal expressions of exclusion or disdain because girls and women may gaze at others more for reasons related to their lower social status, so as to learn as much as possible about others' needs and desires (see LaFrance, 2002, for a discussion of 'Smile boycotts and other body politics', p. 319).

Because girls and women gaze at others often, perhaps mean glares are more effective as a means of wielding power. Third, non-verbal forms of social exclusion may be powerful for girls because their relationships involve high levels of intimacy and self-disclosure (see Buhrmester and Prager, 1995, for a review), thus even subtle indicators of exclusion are threatening. Fourth, non-verbal forms of social exclusion may be powerful for girls because although they fiercely desire and defend popularity with other girls, they dread being labelled as 'stuck up' (Merten, 1997).

=== Marriage ===
Research demonstrates how childhood abuse ties into maladaptive communication dynamics consisting of contempt-laden conflict and emotional withdrawal. These findings are important because maladaptive marital communication may be one mechanism by which traumatic childhood experiences translate into poor adult relationship quality. Forms of verbal aggression, such as contempt, belligerence, and defensiveness, are associated with destructive, hostile patterns of conflict resolution ([Gottman et al., 1998] and [Straus, 1979]). Couples who use such communication styles are more likely to have higher levels of marital distress (Roberts, 2000), lower levels of marital satisfaction (Holman and Jarvis, 2003), and lower levels of marital stability ([Gottman et al., 1998], [Holman and Jarvis, 2003] and [DeMaris, 2000]).

Gottman (1999) identified several behaviors that are particularly indicative of distress in relationships. One series of behaviors, which he termed the "four horsemen", includes a cascading of responses such as expressing criticism, defensiveness, contempt, sarcasm, hostility, and withdrawal, the combination of which indicates a critical state of marriage dissolution.

Carstensen, Gottman, and Levenson (1995) found that "Negative emotional behavior, such as expressed anger, sadness, contempt, and other negative emotions, appears to be the best discriminator between satisfied and dissatisfied marriages". Carstensen, Gottman, and Levenson (1995) also discovered that "In terms of speaker behaviors, wives were coded as showing more total emotion, negative emotion, anger, joy, contempt, whining, and sadness." This supports the stereotype that women express more emotion than men both in general and in relationships. It also supports the idea that men are less expressive than women and tend to be more defensive minded in conversations.

Six short self-report measures were used to assess several component communication skills (Gottman 1999). Specifically, the questionnaires assessed Repair Attempts, Accepting Influence, Harsh Start-Up, Flooding, Gridlock, and the Four Horsemen. These six measures were chosen because they were of theoretical and clinical interest to the authors, incorporated both adaptive and maladaptive communication behaviors, and included those aspects of couple communication considered by many to be most toxic, including withdrawal and contempt (Gottman 1999; Gottman et al. 1998; Johnson 2003). Finally, the Four Horsemen create a cascading sequence of responses in which one partner expresses criticism and the other partner responds with defensiveness, causing the first partner to react to the defensiveness with contempt, sarcasm, and/or hostility with their partner, eventually withdrawing from, or stonewalling, the conversation. This cascading negative sequence which occurs as a repetitive, interlocking pattern is believed to signify a critical end-stage process of relationship dissolution, representing a final common causal pathway to relationship dissolution (see Gottman 1994).

In the book Blink: The Power of Thinking Without Thinking, Canadian author Malcolm Gladwell discusses John Gottman's theories of how to predict which couples will stay married. Gottman's theory states that there are four major emotional reactions that are destructive to a marriage: defensiveness, stonewalling, criticism, and contempt. Among these four, Gottman considers contempt the most destructive of them all. For all other forms of aggression the Four Horsemen emerged as significant predictors of classification, which is expected given that this construct includes very negative, contemptuous behaviors. This is consistent with marital research, which contends that these communication behaviors are highly toxic, and erode relationship satisfaction (Cornelius et al. 2007; Gottman 1999).

=== In racism and misogyny ===
Contempt has a role in racism, misogyny, homophobia, and similar prejudices. For example, Jim Crow laws in the United States showed contempt of African Americans, as do hackneyed racist stereotypes. Jorge Garcia argues that there are two types of racism, one based on hatred or ill-will, the other on contempt and disregard. According to W. E. B. Du Bois, people who are targeted by racist contempt may internalize that contempt, leading to a conflicted self-perception called double consciousness. Internalized contempt can also result in impaired performance on tasks, which is called stereotype threat. Contempt is especially likely to be directed toward members of stigmatized groups, and tends to negatively impact stigmatized groups more than majority groups.

=== Power and distance ===
People are likely to feel contempt towards a person perceived as low-status who is at a distant proximity, with other emotions resulting from different combinations of power and distance.

	Subject is Distant	Subject is Close
Subject is perceived as Powerful	Fear	Envy
Subject is perceived as Powerless	Contempt	Compassion

== See also ==
- Contempt of court
- Moral emotions
- Pejorative
- Hatred
