= Association for Contextual Behavioral Science =

Professional association for ACT, RFT, and behavior analysis

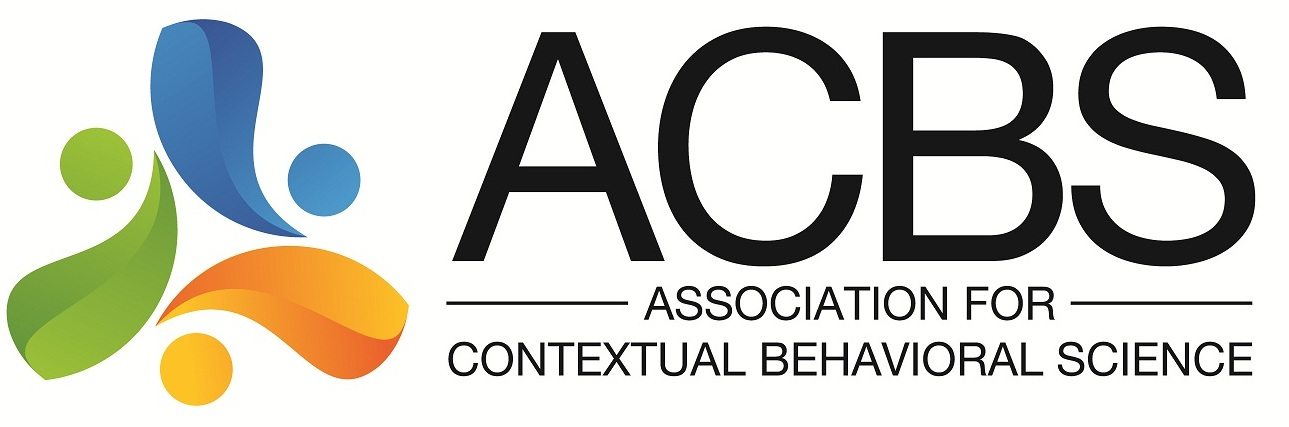
- Logo of ACBS
- Formation: 2005
- Headquarters: United States
- Members: approx. 9,000 international members
- 2026 President: Manuela O'Connell, Ph.D.
- Website: contextualscience.org

The Association for Contextual Behavioral Science (ACBS) is a worldwide nonprofit professional membership organization associated with acceptance and commitment therapy (ACT), and relational frame theory (RFT) among other topics. The term "contextual behavioral science" refers to the application of functional contextualism to human behavior, including contextual forms of applied behavior analysis, cognitive behavioral therapy, and evolution science. In the applied area, Acceptance and Commitment Therapy is perhaps the best known wing of contextual behavioral science, and is an emphasis of ACBS, along with other types of contextual CBT, and efforts in education, organizational behavior, and other areas. ACT is considered an empirically validated treatment by the American Psychological Association, with the status of "Modest Research Support" in depression, Obsessive Compulsive Disorder, mixed anxiety disorders, and psychosis, and "Strong Research Support" in chronic pain. ACT is also listed as evidence-based by the Substance Abuse and Mental Health Services Administration of the United States federal government which has examined randomized trials for ACT in the areas of psychosis, work site stress, and obsessive compulsive disorder, including depression outcomes. In the basic area, Relational Frame Theory is a research program in language and cognition that is considered part of contextual behavioral science, and is a focus of ACBS. Unlike the better known behavioral approach proposed by B.F. Skinner in his book Verbal Behavior, experimental RFT research has emerged in a number of areas traditionally thought to be beyond behavioral perspectives, such as grammar, metaphor, perspective taking, implicit cognition and reasoning.

== History ==
Established in 2005, ACBS has about 9,000 members. Slightly more than one half are outside of the United States. There are 45 ACBS chapters covering many areas of the world including Italy, Japan, Belgium, the Netherlands, Brazil, Australia/New Zealand, France, the United Kingdom, Türkiye, Malaysia, and more. Chapters exist in the United States and Canada as well, including the mid-Atlantic, New England, Washington, Ontario, and several other areas. There are also over 40 Special Interest Groups covering a wide range of basic and applied areas such as children and adolescents, veteran's affairs, ACT for Health, social work, and many other areas.

== Activities ==
- ACBS sponsors an annual conference, the ACBS World Conference. The 2025 (23rd annual) meeting was held in New Orleans, USA, it will be in Lyon, France in 2026, and Hong Kong in 2027.
- In 2012 Elsevier began publishing the official journal of ACBS, the Journal of Contextual Behavioral Science. In 2022 JCBS Impact Factor was 5.00.
- Other activities:
  - A scholarship program that sponsors participants from the developing world to attend the World Conferences.
  - Listservs for professionals and the public. Most Special Interest Groups maintain email listservs as well. The largest listserv is on Acceptance and Commitment Therapy and is for professionals who are ACBS members, with the second largest listserv focusing on Relational Frame Theory (the ACT listserv for professionals spawned its own reference books of popular questions/topics called Talking ACT published by New Harbinger Publications and Context Press.). There is also a free listserv for members of the public who are reading ACT self-help books.
  - A grant program for projects in contextual behavioral science.

The association's website contains resources such as therapist tools, workshops, metaphors, protocols, and assessment materials, and provides information on recent books on acceptance and commitment therapy (ACT), Relational Frame Theory (RFT), and Contextual Behavioral Science (CBS).

== See also ==
- Acceptance and commitment therapy
- Verbal behavior
- Relational frame theory
- Clinical behavior analysis
- Applied behavior analysis
- Cognitive behavior therapy
- Behaviorism
- Radical behaviorism
