= Buyer (fashion) =

Individual who selects what items are stocked

Fashion buyer
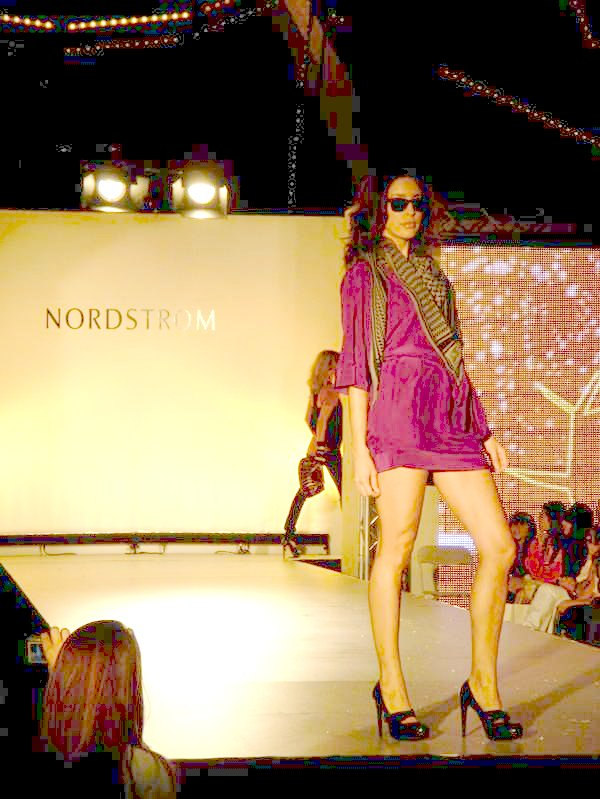
- Model at a Nordstrom fashion show

Occupation
- Names: Buyer, fashion merchandiser
- Occupation type: Profession
- Activity sectors: Fashion

Description
- Competencies: Analytical skills, creativity, enthusiasm, judgment, flexibility
- Fields of employment: Boutiques, retailers
- Related jobs: Buyer

In the retail industry, a buyer is an individual who selects what items are stocked and their key responsibility is dealing with all the products that come into the store. Buyers usually work closely with designers and their designated sales representatives and attend trade fairs, wholesale showrooms and fashion shows to observe trends. They are employed by large department stores, chain stores or smaller boutiques. For smaller independent stores, a buyer may participate in sales as well as promotion, whereas in a major fashion store there may be different levels of seniority such as trainee buyers, assistant buyers, senior buyers and buying managers, and buying directors. Decisions about what to stock can greatly affect fashion businesses.

For buyers at department stores like Harrods or Saks, responsibilities may include ensuring that the store is properly stocked with a wide variety of designer clothing. However, if they support a fashion brand such as Tommy Hilfiger, they may be responsible for directing the entire product development process and then managing the delivery of the products. Their role is also heavily influenced by the structure of their organization; for example, a Christian Dior buyer in the Paris office may supervise the entire development process of the collection. However, in the New York office, a buyer may only source completed product that is suitable for the American market.

== Background ==
The role of a buyer is influenced by the type of retail and business. A buyer is required to possess visual creativity, analytical skills, negotiation skills, business acumen, and a keen awareness of fashion. Retail businesses are generally classified as manufacturers, wholesalers, and retailers. These organizations vary in the scope of their activities and their range of responsibilities within their particular segment of the market.

According to The Role of the Fashion Buyer, buyers typically specialize in one type of merchandise such as women's dresses. However, in a smaller retailer a buyer may buy for a larger, less specialized range such as women's casualwear which may include shirts, skirts, pants, and jackets. The larger the retailer, the more specific the product area is for a buyer. Large companies that have a broad range of products often have separate buying departments for menswear, womenswear, and childrenswear. A buyer at a smaller retailer may buy name brand products while a large company buyer may have the opportunity to be involved in the design and development of the products. A buyer with experience will travel to learn new fashion trends and to visit clothing suppliers.

Assistant buyers play a smaller role in the selection of merchandise since they are still gaining experience. They may help senior buyers with basic aspects of retailing. Assistant buyers may also be in charge of orders and shipments, supervise sales personnel, keep records, and maintain relationships with vendors.

== Buying team ==
Buying and merchandising team structure differ by the type, history, and size of the organization. The traditional structure of a team assigns a buying team and merchandising team to a specific product area, and there are controllers tasked with directing teams across various areas. Buying teams are further divided based on the product area (e.g., athletic wear, leather goods, etc.), organization division (e.g., men's wear).

Buyers work alongside their buyer colleagues because they receive helpful advice from one another. A buyer can have frequent meetings with the buying manager to discuss the development of the range of garments. Buyers also interact often with the merchandising, design, quality control, and fabric technology departments. A buyer meets with the finance, marketing, and retail sales personnel on a less frequent basis.

Some buyers meet regularly to update each other about price ranges as well as to receive or give advice. Buyers often travel together so that they can advise one another on ranges and to coordinate ranges. For instance, a buyer for women's jackets may coordinate with the buyer for women's blouses since the two garments are frequently worn and purchased together.

== Negotiation ==
The Role of the Fashion Buyer states that one part of a buyer's job is to negotiate prices and details of delivery with the supplier. Some retailers provide their buyers with negotiation training courses. When the buyer meets with the supplier, the sales executive of the garment manufacturer submits a "cost price" for a garment. Then the buyer calculates the price that the garment will need to be sold for in order to reach the retailer's mark-up price. The markup price is the difference between the selling price and the manufacturer's cost price. The retail selling price is typically 2.5 or 3 times the price of the manufacturer's cost price. While it may seem like a retailer is making a large profit from this markup, the proceeds are used to cover many costs such as the buyer's salary, store rent, utility bills, and office costs. The markup must be high enough to cover the retailer's expense of "housing" a garment on a rack or a shelf for anywhere from a few days to an entire season, plus the risk that some garments will inevitably have to be marked down to cost, to get them out of the store.

Based on how much consumers are willing to pay, buyers can determine the optimum cost price which they should expect to pay. Suppliers take a different approach to the optimum cost price. The suppliers determine the price based on how much it will cost to produce the garment. The manufacturer's salespeople are typically able to accurately anticipate the price that buyers will expect to pay.

Buyers and suppliers both want to make the largest profits for their companies. The buyers want to buy the garments at the lowest possible price and suppliers want to sell the garments at a high price. Suppliers and buyers must agree on a price and/ financing terms and in some cases they may not agree. If the two cannot agree and the buyer cannot reach a price within the retailer's target margin, the buyer may ask the buying manager for permission to buy the garment at a higher price or else the style may be dropped.

One of the main roles of a buyer is to negotiate with the clothing suppliers. Buyers may negotiate with suppliers on a regular, sometimes daily, basis. It is important for a buyer to establish a strong relationship with the suppliers since it will be beneficial to both parties. Suppliers and buyers have the same goal which is to sell as many garments as possible to customers so they must work together to achieve this goal. Buyers rely heavily on suppliers to "enable ranges to be bought successfully".

The buyer must remember that the retailer and manufacturer share similar goals and that the two need to form an honest relationship based on respect and integrity. Buyers not only select clothing, but are also involved in the ordering and delivering of garments. In some cases, the buyers may also be involved in the product development and display processes.

== Forecasting ==
According to Peter Vogt, buyers predict months and in some cases years in advance what accessories and apparel will sell, and at what prices. The buyers need to stay current with the fashion industry. Depending on the item and season, buyers purchase merchandise six months before it sold in stores. Therefore, they must be able to anticipate fashion trends and consumer needs. In order for buyers to anticipate future trends, they familiarize themselves with current merchandise in catalogs and line sheets and travel to seasonal fashion weeks and shows to view new styles. Companies such as Zara have drastically shortened the buying and production time lines. It is also necessary for a buyer to know his/her customers. They can achieve this by viewing sales records and by spending time on the selling floors.

== Interaction with internal departments ==
Fashion buyers interact frequently with other departments within the company to get advice. It is important to have a large fashion range and to achieve that requires team effort. Buyers coordinate and discuss ideas with the merchandising, marketing, and quality control departments. The internal departments are dependent of one another and they need to work together if the company is to be successful.

== Education ==
A bachelor's degree in retail, buy, marketing, fashion, business, or related field is preferred for a buyer position. One's major does not necessarily matter if the person is familiar with the fashion industry. It is beneficial if one has retail experience such as the executive training program or a previous sales associate position since it is helpful to have an understanding of the selling floor. The executive training program is sometimes offered by larger retailers and it prepares participants for jobs as assistant buyers and eventually buyers for the company.

== Salary ==
A buyer's salary can range from $30,000 to $100,000, depending on location, position, experience, and company. According to the Bureau of Labor Statistics, in 2004 the average income for a buyer was $42,230.

Advancement in a company depends mainly on performance. Therefore, an assistant buyer can easily work their way up to senior buyer within three to five years. Higher levels of management in a company usually require a graduate degree in business.
