= Experiential avoidance =

Attempts to avoid internal experiences

Experiential avoidance (EA) has been broadly defined as attempts to avoid thoughts, feelings, memories, physical sensations, and other internal experiences – even when doing so creates harm in the long run. The process of EA is thought to be maintained through negative reinforcement – that is, short-term relief of discomfort is achieved through avoidance, thereby increasing the likelihood that the avoidance behavior will persist. Importantly, the current conceptualization of EA suggests that it is not negative thoughts, emotions, and sensations that are problematic, but how one responds to them that can cause difficulties. In particular, a habitual and persistent unwillingness to experience uncomfortable thoughts and feelings (and the associated avoidance and inhibition of these experiences) is thought to be linked to a wide range of problems, as opposed to deliberately choosing discomfort, which only results in discomfort.

== Background ==
EA has been popularized by recent third-wave cognitive-behavioral theories such as acceptance and commitment therapy (ACT). However, the general concept has roots in many other theories of psychopathology and intervention.

=== Psychodynamic ===
Defense mechanisms were originally conceptualized as ways to avoid unpleasant affect and discomfort that resulted from conflicting motivations. These processes were thought to contribute to the expression of various types of psychopathology. Gradual removal of these defensive processes are thought to be a key aspect of treatment and eventually return to psychological health.

=== Process-experiential ===
Process-experiential therapy merges client-centered, existential, and Gestalt approaches. Gestalt theory outlines the benefits of being fully aware of and open to one's entire experience. One job of the psychotherapist is to "explore and become fully aware of [the patient's] grounds for avoidance" and to "[lead] the patient back to that which he wishes to avoid" (p. 142). Similar ideas are expressed by early humanistic theory: "Whether the stimulus was the impact of a configuration of form, color, or sound in the environment on the sensory nerves, or a memory trace from the past, or a visceral sensation of fear or pleasure or disgust, the person would be 'living' it, would have it completely available to awareness…he is more open to his feelings of fear and discouragement and pain...he is more able fully to live the experiences of his organism rather than shutting them out of awareness."

=== Behavioral ===
Traditional behavior therapy utilizes exposure to habituate the patient to various types of fears and anxieties, eventually resulting in a marked reduction in psychopathology. In this way, exposure can be thought of as "counter-acting" avoidance, in that it involves individuals repeatedly encountering and remaining in contact with that which causes distress and discomfort.

=== Cognitive ===
In cognitive theory, avoidance interferes with reappraisals of negative thought patterns and schema, thereby perpetuating distorted beliefs. These distorted beliefs are thought to contribute and maintain many types of psychopathology.

=== Third-wave cognitive-behavioral ===
The concept of EA is explicitly described and targeted in more recent CBT modalities including acceptance and commitment therapy (ACT), dialectical behavior therapy (DBT), functional analytic psychotherapy (FAP), and behavioral activation (BA).

== Associated problems ==
- Distress is an inextricable part of life; therefore, avoidance is often only a temporary solution.
- Avoidance reinforces the notion that discomfort, distress and anxiety are bad, or dangerous.
- Sustaining avoidance often requires effort and energy.
- Avoidance limits one's focus at the expense of fully experiencing what is going on in the present.
- Avoidance may get in the way of other important, valued aspects of life.

== Empirical evidence ==
- Laboratory-based thought suppression studies suggest avoidance is paradoxical, in that concerted attempts at suppression of a particular thought often leads to an increase of that thought.
- Studies examining emotional suppression and pain suppression suggest that avoidance is ineffective in the long-run. Conversely, expressing the unpleasant emotions can lead to improvements in the long term, even though it increases negative reactions in the short term.
- Exposure-based therapy techniques have been shown to be effective in treating a wide range of psychiatric disorders.
- Numerous self-report studies have linked EA and related constructs (avoidance coping, thought suppression) to psychopathology and other forms of dysfunction.

== Relevance to psychopathology ==
Seemingly disparate forms of pathological behavior can be understood by their common function (i.e., attempts to avoid distress). Some examples include:

Diagnosis	Example Behaviors	Target of Avoidance
Major depressive disorder	Isolation/suicide	Feelings of sadness, guilt, low self-worth
Posttraumatic stress disorder	Avoiding trauma reminders, hypervigilance	Memories, anxiety, concerns of safety
Social phobia	Avoiding social situations	Anxiety, concerns of judgment from others
Panic disorder	Avoiding situations that might induce panic	Fear, physiological sensations
Agoraphobia	Restricting travel outside of home or other "safe areas"	Anxiety, fear of having symptoms of panic
Obsessive-compulsive disorder	Checking/rituals	Worry of consequences (e.g., "contamination")
Substance use disorders	Abusing alcohol/drugs	Emotions, memories, withdrawal symptoms
Eating disorders	Restricting food intake, purging	Worry about becoming "overweight", fear of losing control
Borderline personality disorder	Self-harm (e.g., cutting)	High emotional arousal

== Relevance to quality of life ==
Perhaps the most significant impact of EA is its potential to disrupt and interfere with important, valued aspects of an individual's life. That is, EA is seen as particularly problematic when it occurs at the expense of a person's deeply held values. Some examples include:

- Putting off an important task because of the discomfort it evokes.
- Not taking advantage of an important opportunity due to attempts to avoid worries of failure or disappointment.
- Not engaging in physical activity/exercise, meaningful hobbies, or other recreational activities due to the effort they demand.
- Avoiding social gatherings or interactions with others because of the anxiety and negative thoughts they evoke.
- Not being a full participant in social gatherings due to attempts to regulate anxiety relating to how others are perceiving you.
- Being unable to fully engage in meaningful conversations with others because one is scanning for signs of danger in the environment (attempting to avoid feeling "unsafe").
- Inability to "connect" and sustain a close relationship because of attempts to avoid feelings of vulnerability.
- Staying in a "bad" relationship to try to avoid discomfort, guilt, and potential feelings of loneliness a break-up might entail.
- Losing a marriage or contact with children due to an unwillingness to experience uncomfortable feelings (e.g., achieved through drug or alcohol abuse) or symptoms of withdrawal.
- Not attending an important graduation, wedding, funeral, or other family event to try to avoid anxiety or symptoms of panic.
- Engaging in self-destructive behaviors in an attempt to avoid feelings of boredom, emptiness, worthlessness.
- Not functioning or taking care of basic responsibilities (e.g., personal hygiene, waking up, showing up to work, shopping for food) because of the effort they demand and/or distress they evoke.
- Spending so much time attempting to avoid discomfort that one has little time for anyone or anything else in life.

== Measurement ==
=== Self-report ===
The Acceptance and Action Questionnaire (AAQ) was the first self-report measure explicitly designed to measure EA, but has since been re-conceptualized as a measure of "psychological flexibility". The 62-item Multidimensional Experiential Avoidance Questionnaire (MEAQ) was developed to measure different aspects of EA. The Brief Experiential Avoidance Questionnaire (BEAQ) is a 15-item measure developed using MEAQ items, which has become the most widely used measure of experiential avoidance.

== See also ==
- Avoidant personality disorder
- Coping (psychology)

=== Opposite concepts ===
- Acceptance
- Distress tolerance
- Psychological flexibility

=== Related concepts ===
- Denial
- Expressive suppression
