= Flexibility (personality) =

Extent to which a person can cope with changes

Flexibility is a personality trait that describes the extent to which a person can cope with changes in circumstances and think about problems and tasks in novel, creative ways. This trait comes into play when stressors or unexpected events occur, requiring that a person change their stance, outlook, or commitment.

Flexibility, or psychological flexibility, as it is sometimes called, is the ability to adapt to situational demands, balance life demands, and commit to behaviors.

Flexible personality should not be confused with cognitive flexibility, which is the ability to switch between two concepts, and to simultaneously think about multiple concepts. Researchers of cognitive flexibility describe it as the ability to switch one's thinking and attention between tasks.

== Measures/assessments ==
Due to the different facets of the definition of psychological flexibility, it is difficult to measure. There are multiple questionnaires that attempt to do so.

=== Acceptance and Action Questionnaire ===
The Acceptance and Action Questionnaire (AAQ) was designed to measure experiential avoidance. This test found that higher levels of avoidance are linked to higher levels of general psychopathology, depression, anxiety, fears, and a lower quality of life. AAQ also measures avoidant coping and self-deceptive positivity. It was later decided that the AAQ actually measured psychological flexibility, not experiential avoidance. It was used until the AAQ-II was created.

=== Acceptance and Action Questionnaire II ===
The AAQ-II was developed in order to improve upon the faults of the AAQ, which included scale brevity, item wording, and item selection procedures that caused insufficient alpha levels to be obtained in measurements. AAQ-II scores predict many outcomes, including mental health and work absence rates. AAQ-II also was more psychometrically consistent than the original AAQ.

Laboratory measures of flexibility are consistent with how flexible people are in their actual lives. The validity of the AAQ has again been brought into question, primarily by inconsistent results. Studies have shown that both versions of the AAQ appear to measure the same thing, which is neuroticism/negative affect rather than experiential avoidance.

== Impacts on life ==
=== Parent–child relationships ===
Research shows that parenting psychological flexibility may influence the relationship between parent distress and child distress. When parents are psychologically inflexible they cause more stress in their families.

A similar study looked at the longitudinal relationship between perceived parenting style and psychological flexibility among students over six years (7th–12th grade). Psychological flexibility decreased with age: as children grow older they become more set in their thoughts and habits, being less likely to change them due to circumstances. Results also indicated that authoritarian parenting styles predicted low psychological flexibility in children. Parents who over-control their children tend to restrict how well their children cope with stressors. Also, children with more psychological flexibility in 9th grade were more likely to have decreases in authoritarian and increases in authoritative parenting style later on.

Authoritative parenting styles seem to be associated with psychological flexibility in children. Authoritative parents tend to be more warm, fair, and encouraging than those with other parenting styles, which may be why children raised by this style have more psychological flexibility. Such children are encouraged to be independent and are supported, so they are able to adjust to situations that do not go as predicted.

=== Work environment ===
Psychological flexibility improves mental health and absence rates. A mediating variable is job control, which suggests that people have more psychological flexibility when they have more control over their jobs. This is likely due to workers feeling less restricted in what they can do and more empowered to solve problems. A longitudinal study on psychological flexibility and job control showed that these variables predicted workers' mental health, job performance, and even their ability to learn new software. The study demonstrates the power of psychological flexibility in the workplace: psychologically flexible workers have better mental health and job performance. Allowing workers more job control could increase work productivity by increasing the workers' psychological flexibility. In leadership studies, flexibility, defined as "the ability to get along with different groups and adapt to the demands of many organizations," is one aspect of portability, or the ability to acquire skills and move from one company to the next.

=== Health ===
The ability to cope and be flexible is positively associated with psychological health. Flexibility reduces depression, anxiety, and stress. An experiment analyzed the relationship between difficulty identifying and describing feelings (DIDF) and psychological flexibility in men undergoing cancer screenings. Results showed that DIDF and psychological flexibility were reliable predictors of mental health. However, psychological flexibility only predicted mental health when DIDF was involved. Psychological flexibility allowed participants to have a better understanding of the subtleties of pleasant and unpleasant emotions. This understanding allowed participants to identify and describe their feelings better, thus enhancing their mental health.

A two-year longitudinal study found that psychological flexibility helps with long-term emotional adjustment. People who are better able to enhance and suppress their expression of emotions are less likely to be stressed over time. People with more psychological flexibility also have greater endurance, higher pain tolerance, and a quicker recovery rate to baseline levels when experiencing physical pain.

== How to improve ==
People can improve their psychological flexibility by training, such as by engaging in various forms of psychotherapy.

=== Acceptance and commitment therapy ===
The main goal of acceptance and commitment therapy (ACT) is to increase psychological flexibility. It helps people accept unavoidable events, identify actions that will lead to goals, and acknowledge thoughts rather than accepting or disregarding them. When psychological flexibility was targeted in one study of ACT, there was a stronger reduction in psychological distress. There are six core processes in ACT interventions: acceptance, cognitive defusion, self as context, being present, values, and committed action.

Acceptance
teaches people to embrace their emotions, rather than trying to get rid of them. An example of acceptance would be when sadness is felt. Instead of trying to push the sadness away via distraction, they learn to sit with the feeling and react with peace rather than trying to fight it, as fighting often makes the feeling more powerful.
Cognitive defusion
teaches people to not take their thoughts as literally true in order to decrease the believability of negative thoughts and increase flexibility to behave as they want. An example of cognitive defusion would be when someone thinks "I am the worst," and then notices the thought for what it is—mere words—perhaps by saying to themselves "I am having the thought that I am the worst". This is in contrast to a cognitive therapy approach where the person might challenge the thought by thinking of things in which he or she excels.
Self-as-context
attempts to have people experience their own thoughts and feelings without attaching the content of them to themselves. This process helps people separate themselves from thoughts or feelings that may negatively influence their actions or how they view themselves.and experience themselves
Being present
teaches people to directly experience the world by paying attention to the moment and being aware. An example of being present would be meditation and mindfulness.
Values
teaches people to take actions in deliberate furtherance of qualities they choose. An example is somebody who chooses to continue to improve on being a father (chosen quality) by reliving painful childhood memories about how his own father parented him (action). The purpose is not to encourage pain, but rather to allow people to deal with pain for a valued choice, such as being a good father.
Committed action
teaches people to make changes in behavior in deliberate furtherance of qualities they choose. Committed action involves identifying psychological barriers that will interfere with short, medium, and longer-term goals and then working through those barriers in order to reach the goals.

== See also ==
- Adaptive performance – Adjusting to and understanding change in a workplace
- Emotional regulation – Concept in psychology
- Integrative complexity – Research psychometric
- Openness to experience – Personality trait
- Psychological resilience – Ability to mentally cope with a crisis
