= Matthias Berking =

American university teacher and psychotherapist

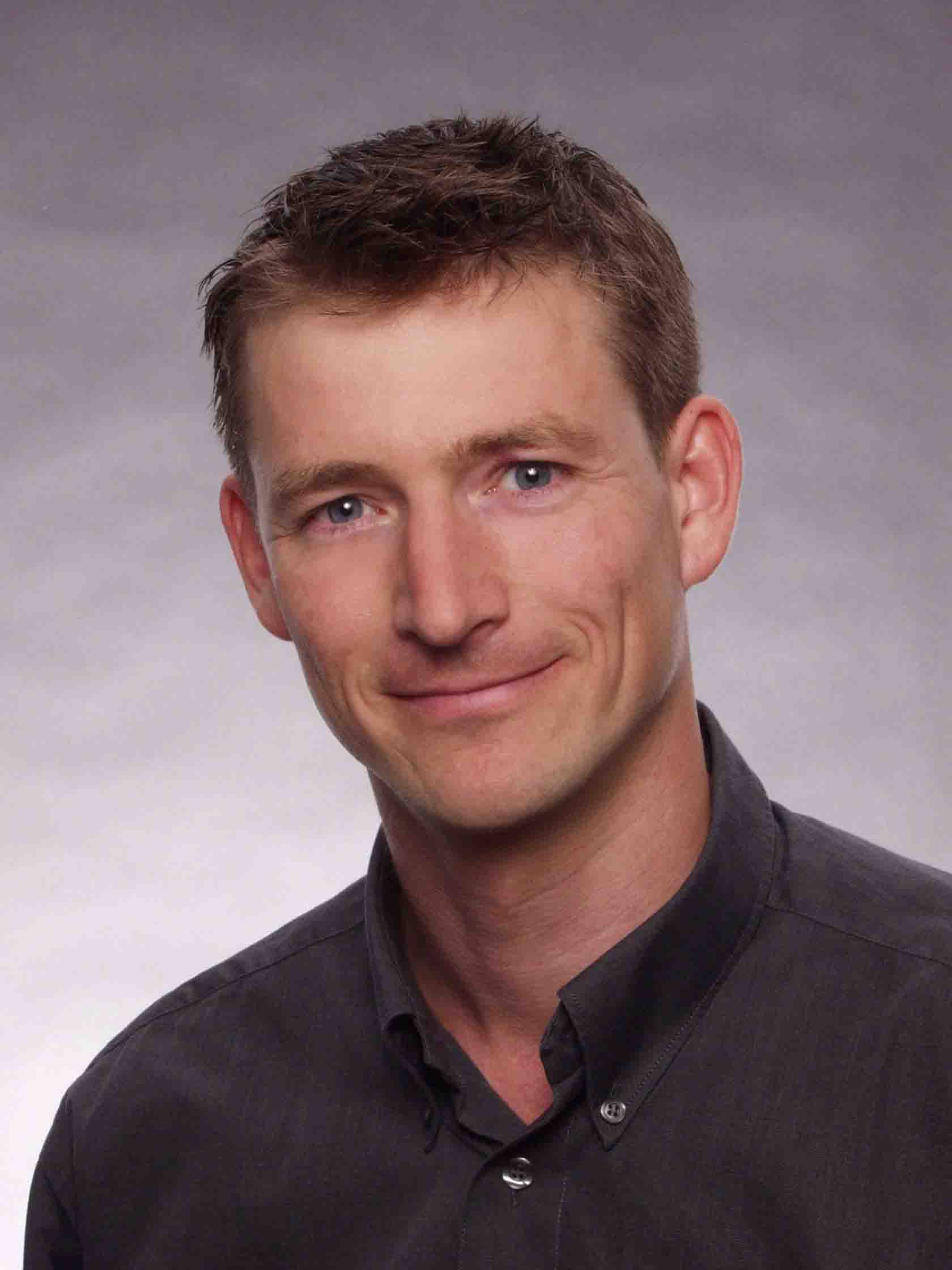
Matthias Berking (2004)

Matthias Berking (born 30 April 1971 in Pittsburgh, Pennsylvania) is a professor of psychology and a psychotherapist at the University of Erlangen.

== Field of research ==
Berking's field of research is the regulation of emotion.

== Selected works ==
=== German publications ===
- Berking, M.: Training emotionaler Kompetenzen (3. Aufl). Springer, Heidelberg 2014, ISBN 978-3-642-54016-5
- Berking, M. & Rief, W. (Publ.): Klinische Psychologie und Psychotherapie. Band I Grundlagen und Störungswissen. Springer, Heidelberg 2012, ISBN 978-3-642-16973-1
- Berking, M. & Rief, W. (Publ.): Klinische Psychologie und Psychotherapie. Band II: Therapieverfahren. Springer, Heidelberg 2012, ISBN 978-3-642-25522-9
- Berking, M. & Heizer, K.: Förderung emotionaler Kompetenzen. In: W. Lutz (Publ.). Lehrbuch Psychotherapie. Huber, Bern 2010, ISBN 978-3-456-84839-6
- Berking, M.: Therapieziele. In: G. H. Paar, F. Lamprecht, R. Meermann, S. Wiegand-Grefe, G. Schmid-Ott & C. Jacobi (Publ.). Leitlinien für die Psychosomatische Rehabilitation (S. 287-291). Schattauer, Stuttgart 2008

=== English publications ===
- Berking, M. & Lukas, C.: The Affect Regulation Training (ART): A Transdiagnostic Approach to the Prevention and Treatment of Mental Disorders. In: Current Opinion in Psychology, 3, 2015, S. 64-69. (IF: noch nicht veröffentlicht)
- Berking, M. & Whitley, B.: Affect Regulation Training (ART). New York: Springer, New York 2014, ISBN 978-1-4939-1021-2
- Berking, M. & Schwarz, J.: The Affect Regulation Training. In: Gross, J. J. Handbook of emotion regulation (529-547). Guilford, New York 2013, ISBN 978-1-4625-0350-6
- Berking, M., Wirtz, C., Svaldi, J., & Hofmann, S.: Emotion-regulation predicts depression over five years. In: Behaviour Research and Therapy, 57, 2014, 13-20. doi:10.1016/j.brat.2014.03.003 (IF 4.13)
- Berking, M., Ebert, D., Cuijpers, P., & Hofmann, S.G.: Emotion-regulation skills training enhances the efficacy of cognitive behavioral therapy for major depressive disorder. In: Psychotherapy and Psychosomatics, 82, 2013, 234-245. doi:10.1159/000348448 (IF: 7.23)
