= Crystallized self =

Individuals often maintain different versions of themselves in different types of relationships, such as in familial, romantic, and professional relationships. Within each type of relationship, the way an individual acts can change because of the varied nature of each of these relationships. Many describe these different behaviors as "fake selves" used to maintain certain impressions. The term Crystallized Self states that if there are no fake or real selves, then the self must be crystallized, and doesn't change based on who the individual is interacting with. This concept is the preface to the idea of crystallized behavior. The nature of this type of behavior is fluid, multidimensional, and complex. Described experientially, it is when an individual alters their behavior, language, and identity depending on the context with which they are interacting. The Crystallized Self includes ideas of (1) disciplining; (2) multiple facets of identity; (3) the gendered work involved in boundary-spanning; critical intersectionality; and (5) qualitative research. These bring into question how "fluid" our selves can possibly be. Understanding the different dimensions of identity and self has been a continuously researched topic. Dr. Peter Burke, a professor in Cambridge University, stated, "Identities tell us who we are and they announce to others who we are... Identities subsequently guide behavior, leading "fathers" to behave like "fathers" and "nurses" to act like "nurses.""

== Theory Behind Self ==
There are many theories that explain the evolution of identity. The identity is something that is not set in stone, but rather it is something that is constantly re-purposing itself and changing. According to skeptical post-modern theories, the self cannot be based on a foundation of mere experiences because a constant flow of information is streaming through the mind and changing the very way people identify with themselves and their environment. To remedy this, post-structuralist theorists expanded on this because of the infinite way significance can be perceived by way of knowledge in language. The relationship between words and what they symbolize is constantly evolving which creates the notion that identity and the self is "a product and effect of competing, fragmentary and contradictory discourses." This leads to the comparison of the self to a crystal. Crystals are multidimensional much like identity. No matter the condition, crystals are still able to exist in different states, sizes, and colors. The more the crystal endures throughout its existence, the more complex and unique it becomes. Identity, on the other hand, becomes more complex and unique by way of discourse and language, thus leading to the metaphor known as the "crystallized self".

== False and True Self ==
This concept expounds on the idea of "true self" and "false self." The "true self" is described as being authentic or vulnerable. The "false self" is mostly described as an idealized self. The idea is categorizing what reactions people reveal depending on who they are talking to, and what environment a certain individual is in. This idea was introduced by Dr. Donald Winnicott in 1960. The "true self" is the product of an individual's feelings, desires, and thoughts. Different environments and meeting numerous people have an effect on the self. These factors can cause someone to hide their feelings, desires, and/or thoughts. This creates a "false self" that is more or less the self that is shaped by one's environment and relationships. This "self" is also formed by expectations that are held towards a certain individual.

An alternative metaphor is the "crystallized self", a notion that pulls from Laurel Richardson's (2001) epistemological notion of "crystallization". The "crystallized self" is considered a positive term that helps people to experience and talk about the self in more appropriately politicized and layered ways. Tracy and Tretheway say: "The crystallized self is neither real nor fake.... The crystallized self is multidimensional; the more facets, the more beautiful and complex. Certainly, crystals may feel solid, stable, and fixed. But just as crystals have differing forms, depending upon whether they grow rapidly or slowly, under constant or fluctuating conditions, or from highly variable or remarkably uniform fluids or gasses, crystallized selves have different shapes depending on the various discourses through which they are constructed and constrained". Viewing the self as crystallized moves away from ideas of which parts of the self are more "authentic" and rather suggests that the self is constructed through context and communication. Multiple facets can be "real" and competing simultaneously.

== Criticism of Academia ==
The concept of a Crystallized Self as established by Sarah J. Tracy is in large a criticism of the common academic approach to identity in psychology. The basis of this criticism is that research does not challenge the real-self/fake-self dichotomy enough and takes into account the multiplicity of identity.

== The Crystallized Self in Indian Psychology ==
In Indian psychology, the idea of the crystallized self refers to enlightenment and a loss of the self that is opposed to egoism.

== See also ==
- Identity (social science)
- True self and false self
