= Functional contextualism =

Philosophy of behavior science with pragmatism

Functional contextualism is an extension and contextualistic interpretation of B.F. Skinner's radical behaviorism rooted in philosophical pragmatism and contextualism. It considers behavior as "acts in context", inseparable from its current and historical context. The truth criterion of contextualism is "successful working": acts (behavior and thoughts) are true or 'truth' or valid when they lead to effective action, or achievement of some goal. Functional contextualism was first delineated by Steven C. Hayes, and serves as the basis of his theory of language known as relational frame theory and his acceptance and commitment therapy.

== Contextualism ==
The form of contextualism from which functional contextualism emerged is the one described by the philosopher Stephen C. Pepper in his book World Hypotheses: A Study in Evidence. In this work, Pepper noted that philosophical systems tend to cluster around a few distinct "world hypotheses" or "world views". Each world view is characterized by a distinctive underlying root metaphor and truth criterion. Root metaphors are based on seemingly well-understood, common-sense, everyday objects or ideas, and serve as the basic analogy by which an analyst attempts to understand the world. A world view's root metaphor roughly corresponds to its ontological assumptions, or views about the nature of being or existence (e.g., whether the universe is deterministic or not). Truth criteria are inextricably linked to their root metaphors, and provide the basis for evaluating the validity of analyses. A world view's truth criterion roughly corresponds to its epistemological assumptions, or views about the nature of knowledge and truth (e.g., whether it is discovered or constructed).

The root metaphor of contextualism is the "act in context", whereby any event is interpreted as an ongoing act inseparable from its current and historical context. The truth criterion of contextualism is often dubbed "successful working", whereby the truth and meaning of an idea lies in its function or utility, not in how well it is said to mirror reality. In contextualism, an analysis is said to be true or valid insofar it as it leads to effective action, or achievement of some goal. Contextualism is Pepper's term for the philosophical pragmatism developed by Charles Sanders Peirce, William James, John Dewey, and others.

== Varieties of contextualism ==
Analytic goals are vitally important to the contextualistic world view. This is because the analytic tools of contextualism—its root metaphor and truth criterion—both hinge on the purpose of the analysis, and neither can be mounted effectively without a clearly specified analytic goal. The pragmatic truth criterion of "successful working" is rendered meaningless in an analysis without an explicit goal because "success" can only be measured in relation to the achievement of some objective.

Likewise, the root metaphor of the "act-in-context" is rendered meaningless in an analysis without an explicit goal because there would be no basis on which to restrict the analysis to a subset of the infinite expanse of the act's historical and environmental context. Without a clear analytic goal, the contextualist could analyze the endless context of an act in perpetuity, without ever knowing when the analysis was complete or good enough to be deemed "true" or "useful". It is very difficult for a contextualist without an explicit goal to construct or share knowledge.

Contextualists can, and do, adopt different analytic goals, and the many different varieties of contextualism can be distinguished by their goals. Based on their overarching analytic goals, contextualistic theories can be divided into two general categories: "descriptive contextualism" and "functional contextualism".

=== Descriptive contextualism ===
Descriptive contextualists seek to understand the complexity and richness of a whole event through a personal and aesthetic appreciation of its participants and features. This approach reveals a strong adherence to the root metaphor of contextualism and can be likened to the enterprise of history, in which stories of the past are constructed in an attempt to understand whole events. The knowledge constructed by the descriptive contextualist is personal, ephemeral, specific, and spatiotemporally restricted. Like a historical narrative, it is knowledge that reflects an in-depth personal understanding of a particular event that occurred (or is occurring) at a particular time and place. Most forms of contextualism, including social constructionism, dramaturgy, hermeneutics, and narrative approaches, are instances of descriptive contextualism.

=== Functional contextualism ===
Functional contextualists, on the other hand, seek to predict and influence events using empirically based concepts and rules. This approach reveals a strong adherence to contextualism's extremely practical truth criterion and can be likened to the enterprise of science or engineering, in which general rules and principles are used to predict and control events. Rules or theories that do not contribute to the achievement of one's practical goals are ignored or rejected. Knowledge constructed by the functional contextualist is general, abstract, and spatiotemporally unrestricted. Like a scientific principle, it is knowledge that is likely to be applicable to all (or many) similar such events, regardless of time or place.
