= Clinical Psychology: Science and Practice =

- Discipline: Clinical psychology
- Language: English
- Edited by: Arthur M. Nezu

Publication details
- History: 1994–present
- Publisher: Wiley-Blackwell
- Frequency: Quarterly
- Impact factor: 6.028 (2018)

Standard abbreviations
- ISO 4: Clin. Psychol. (New York)

Indexing
- ISSN: 0969-5893 (print); 1468-2850 (web)
- LCCN: 2002253399
- OCLC no.: 865216431

Links
- Journal homepage; Online access; Online archive

Clinical Psychology: Science and Practice is a quarterly peer-reviewed scientific journal covering clinical psychology. It was established in 1994 and is published by Wiley-Blackwell on behalf of the Society of Clinical Psychology, Division 12 of the American Psychological Association, of which it is the official journal. Beginning in 2021, it will be published by the Association's publishing arm, APA Publishing. The editor-in-chief is Arthur M. Nezu (Drexel University). According to the Journal Citation Reports, the journal has a 2018 impact factor of 6.028, ranking it 4th out of 130 journals in the category "Psychology, Clinical".
