= Marion Underwood =

American psychologist and researcher of social aggression

Marion K. Underwood is an American psychologist and incoming Provost for George Mason University as well as former provost and executive vice president of Colorado State University. She formerly served as dean of Purdue University's College of Health and Human Sciences, a position she assumed on August 1, 2018. She is a researcher in social aggression and is a fellow of the Association for Psychological Science.

== Career ==
Underwood graduated from Wellesley College in 1986 and received her Ph.D. in clinical psychology from Duke University in 1991. She joined the faculty at Reed College in 1991, where she received tenure. From 1998 to 2018, she had various roles at the University of Texas at Dallas. In 2008, she was named to an Endowed Chair, as Ashbel Smith Professor. From 2015 to 2018, she served as dean of graduate studies and associate provost.

She studies social aggression (also known as relational aggression) in children and teens as well as adolescents' use of social media, text messaging, and other digital forms of communication. Her work has been seen on CNN, The New York Times, and The Atlantic, among others.

== BlackBerry project ==
As part of a longitudinal study, Underwood provided free BlackBerrys to ninth-graders in exchange for permission to study the teens' text messages. On average, each student sent 1,321 text messages per month (about 43 per day). Underwood and her colleagues found that less than 2% of text messages had antisocial content (such as rule-breaking, drug use, physical aggression, or property crimes.) Many of the text messages included teens "building each other up" and providing support.

== Selected works ==
=== Articles ===
- Underwood, Marion K.; Ehrenreich, Samuel E.; More, David; Solis, Jerome S.; Brinkley, Dawn Y. (2015). "The BlackBerry Project: The Hidden World of Adolescents' Text Messaging and Relations With Internalizing Symptoms". Journal of Research on Adolescence. 25 (1): 101–117. doi:10.1111/jora.12101. PMC 4348020. PMID 25750494.
- Underwood, Marion K.; Ehrenreich, Samuel E. (2017). "The Power and the Pain of Adolescents' Digital Communication: Cyber Victimization and the Perils of Lurking". American Psychologist. 72 (2): 144–158. doi:10.1037/a0040429. PMC 5325156. PMID 28221066.
- Brinkley, Dawn Y.; Ackerman, Robert A.; Ehrenreich, Samuel; Underwood, Marion K. (2017). "Sending and Receiving Text Messages with Sexual Content: Relations with Early Sexual Activity and Borderline Personality Features in Late Adolescence". Computers in Human Behavior. 70: 119–130. doi:10.1016/j.chb.2016.12.082. PMC 5560614. PMID 28824224.

=== Books ===
- Underwood, Marion K. (April 10, 2003). Social Aggression among Girls (The Guilford Series on Social and Emotional Development). The Guilford Press. ISBN 978-1572308657.
- Underwood, Marion K.; Rosen, Lisa H., eds. (September 19, 2013). Social Development: Relationships in Infancy, Childhood, and Adolescence. The Guilford Press. ISBN 978-1572308657.
