= Steven C. Hayes =

American psychologist

- Born: August 12, 1948 (age 78)
- Known for: Relational frame theory; Acceptance and commitment therapy (ACT); Process-based therapy

Academic background
- Education: Loyola Marymount University; West Virginia University

Steven C. Hayes (born August 12, 1948) is an American clinical psychologist and Nevada Foundation Professor at the University of Nevada, Reno Department of Psychology, where he is a faculty member in their Ph.D. program in behavior analysis. He is known for developing relational frame theory, an account of human higher cognition, and as the co-developer of acceptance and commitment therapy (ACT), a popular evidence-based form of psychotherapy that uses mindfulness, acceptance, and values-based methods, and is the co-developer of process-based therapy, a new approach to evidence-based therapies more generally. He also coined the term clinical behavior analysis.

Hayes is the author of 47 books and 675 articles. His books have been published in 20 languages. As of January 2022, Google Scholar data ranks Hayes among the top 1,000 most cited living scholars in all areas of study worldwide. As of December 2021, Research.com data ranks Hayes as the #63 Top Scientist in Psychology in the world and the #39 Top Scientist in Psychology in the United States. He was listed in 1992 by the Institute for Scientific Information as the 30th "highest impact" psychologist. According to Time columnist John Cloud, "Steven Hayes is at the top of his field. A past president of the distinguished Association for Behavioral and Cognitive Therapies, he has written or co-written some 300 peer-reviewed articles and 27 books. Few psychologists are so well published".

== Career ==
Hayes received his B.A. in psychology from Loyola Marymount University in Los Angeles and his M.A. and Ph.D. in clinical psychology from West Virginia University. After completing his clinical internship under David Barlow at the Brown University School of Medicine, he joined the Department of Psychology faculty at the University of North Carolina at Greensboro. In 1986, he became a Professor in the Department of Psychology at the University of Nevada, Reno.

Hayes has been president of the American Psychological Association Division 25, the president of the American Association of Applied and Preventive Psychology, the president of the Association for Behavioral and Cognitive Therapies, and the president of the Association for Contextual Behavioral Science, and the first secretary-treasurer of the Association for Psychological Science. He served a 5-year term on the National Advisory Council for Drug Abuse in the National Institutes of Health. He is on the advisory board of USERN and is president of the Institute for Better Health.

In 2022, Hayes was involved in a controversy over two papers he published with David Barlow and Kelly Brownell in 1977 and 1983 about the practice of covert sensitization in homosexual and transgender individuals with the intent of changing their sexual arousal and gender identity. The controversy emerged following a letter Hayes, along with 36 other past presidents of the Association for Behavioral and Cognitive Therapies, signed regarding the organization's role in the practice of conversion therapy. Although the letter did not name Barlow, Brownwell, or Hayes as individuals who engaged in these research practices, Hayes created a personal apology and requested that his research be retracted.

== Scientific contributions ==
Hayes developed a widely used and evidence-based psychological intervention often used in counseling called acceptance and commitment therapy (ACT), There are currently over 900 randomized trials of acceptance and commitment therapy and as the result of multiple randomized trials of ACT by the World Health Organization, WHO now distributes ACT-based self-help for "anyone who experiences stress, wherever they live, and whatever their circumstances." Organizations that have stated that acceptance and commitment therapy is empirically supported in certain areas or as a whole according to their standards include: Society of Clinical Psychology (American Psychological Association Division 12), World Health Organization, National Institute for Health and Care Excellence, Australian Psychological Society, Netherlands Institute of Psychologists: Sections of Neuropsychology and Rehabilitation, Sweden Association of Physiotherapists, SAMHSA's National Registry of Evidence-based Programs and Practices, the California Evidence-Based Clearinghouse for Child Welfare, and the U.S. Department of Veterans Affairs/Department of Defense.

Hayes developed relational frame theory (RFT), an account of human higher cognition. Approximately 300 studies have tested RFT ideas.

In collaboration with Stefan Hofmann, David Sloan Wilson, Joseph Ciarrochi, and others, Hayes has been developing process-based therapy, an idiographic treatment approach based on cognitive behavioral therapy that combines insights from evolution theory and complex network theory to target processes that underlie effective psychological treatments.

== Awards ==
- Nevada System of Higher Education: Nevada Regents' Researcher Award (2022)
- American Association for the Advancement of Science: Fellow (2018)
- Association for Contextual Behavioral Science: Fellow (2012)
- Society for the Advancement of Behavior Analysis: Impact of Science on Application (2007)
- Association for Behavioral and Cognitive Therapies: Career/Lifetime Achievement Award (2007)
- American Psychological Association Division 25: Don Hake Translational Research Award (2000)
- Nevada System of Higher Education: Regents' Mid-Career Researcher of the Year (2000)
- University of Nevada, Reno: Outstanding Researcher of the Year Award (1997)

== Selected works ==
- Hayes, S. C., Barnes-Holmes, D., & Roche, B. (Eds.). (2001). Relational Frame Theory: A Post-Skinnerian account of human language and cognition. New York: Plenum Press. ISBN 0-306-46600-7
- Hayes, Steven C. (2004-01-01). "Acceptance and commitment therapy, relational frame theory, and the third wave of behavioral and cognitive therapies". Behavior Therapy. 35 (4): 639–665. doi:10.1016/S0005-7894(04)80013-3.
- Hayes, Steven C.; Spencer Smith (2005). Get Out of Your Mind and Into Your Life: The New Acceptance and Commitment Therapy. New Harbinger Publications. ISBN 1-57224-425-9.
- Hayes, Steven C.; Kirk D. Strosahl; Kelly G. Wilson (2011). Acceptance and Commitment Therapy, Second Edition: The Process and Practice of Mindful Change (2nd ed.). Guilford Press. ISBN 978-1-60918-962-4.
- Hayes, Steven C.; Follette, Victoria M.; Linehan, Marsha M., eds. (2011). Mindfulness and Acceptance: Expanding the Cognitive-Behavioral Tradition. Guilford Press. ISBN 978-1-60918-989-1.
- Hayes, S. C., Villatte, M., Levin, M. & Hildebrandt, M. (2011). Open, aware, and active: Contextual approaches as an emerging trend in the behavioral and cognitive therapies. Annual Review of Clinical Psychology, 7,141-168. doi: 10.1146/annurev-clinpsy-032210-104449
- Wilson, D. S., & Hayes, S. C. (2018). Evolution and Contextual Behavioral Science: An Integrated Framework for Understanding, Predicting, and Influencing Behavior. Menlo Park, CA: New Harbinger Press.
- Hayes, S. C. & Hofmann, S. G. (Eds.) (2018). "Process-based CBT: The science and core clinical competencies of cognitive behavioral therapy". Oakland, CA: New Harbinger Publications. ISBN 978-1-62625-596-8.
- Hayes, Steven C. (2019). A Liberated Mind New York: Penguin/Avery.
- Atkins, P. W. D., Wilson, D. S., & Hayes, S. C. (2019). Prosocial: Using evolutionary science to build productive, equitable, and collaborative groups. New Harbinger
- Hayes, S. C. & Hofmann, S. G. (Eds.) (2020). Beyond the DSM: Toward a process-based alternative for diagnosis and mental health treatment. Oakland, CA: Context Press / New Harbinger Publications. ISBN 978-1-68403-661-5.
- Hofmann, S. G., Hayes, S. C., & Lorscheid, D. (2021). Learning process-based therapy: A skills training manual for targeting the core processes of psychological change in clinical practice. Oakland, CA: New Harbinger Press. ISBN 1-68403-755-7.
