= Relational frame theory =

Psychological theory of human language

Relational frame theory (RFT) is a behavior analytic theory of human language, cognition, and behaviour developed by Steven C. Hayes. RFT is rooted in functional contextualism, and argues that the building block of human language and higher cognition is relating, i.e. the human ability to create bidirectional links between things. Relational frame theory focuses on how humans learn language (i.e., communication) through interactions with the environment.

== Origins and development ==
RFT is a behavioral theory of language and higher cognition. rooted in functional contextualism.

In his 1957 book Verbal Behavior, B.F. Skinner presented an interpretation of language. However, this account was intended to be an interpretation as opposed to an experimental research program, and researchers commonly acknowledge that the research products are somewhat limited in scope. For example, Skinner's behavioral interpretation of language has been useful in some aspects of language training in developmentally disabled children, but it has not led to a robust research program in the range of areas relevant to language and cognition, such as problem-solving, reasoning, metaphor, logic, and so on. RFT advocates are fairly bold in stating that their goal is an experimental behavioral research program in all such areas, and RFT research has indeed emerged in a large number of these areas, including grammar.

In a review of Skinner's book, linguist Noam Chomsky argued that the generativity of language shows that it cannot simply be learned, that there must be some innate "language acquisition device". Many have seen this review as a turning point, when cognitivism took the place of behaviorism as the mainstream in psychology. Behavior analysts generally viewed the criticism as somewhat off point. However, it is undeniable that psychology turned its attention elsewhere, and the review was very influential in helping to produce the rise of cognitive psychology.

Despite the lack of attention from the mainstream, behavior analysis is alive and growing. Its application has been extended to areas such as language and cognitive training. Behavior analysis has long been extended as well to animal training, business and school settings, as well as hospitals and areas of research.

RFT was originally developed by Steven C. Hayes of University of Nevada, Reno and has been extended in research, notably by Dermot Barnes-Holmes and colleagues of Ghent University.

RFT distinguishes itself from Skinner's work by identifying and defining a particular type of operant conditioning known as arbitrarily applicable derived relational responding (AADRR). In essence, the theory argues that language is not associative but is learned and relational. For example, young children learn relations of coordination between names and objects; followed by relations of difference, opposition, before and after, and so on. These are "frames" in the sense that once relating of that kind is learned, any event can be related in that way mutually and in combination with other relations, given a cue to do so. This is a learning process that to date appears to occur only in humans possessing a capacity for language: to date relational framing has not yet been shown unambiguously in non-human animals despite many attempts to do so. AADRR is theorized to be a pervasive influence on almost all aspects of human behavior. The theory represents an attempt to provide a more empirically progressive account of complex human behavior while preserving the naturalistic approach of behavior analysis.

== Description of RFT ==
=== Relating ===
Relational frame theory argues that the building block of human language and higher cognition is relating, i.e. the human ability to create bidirectional links between things. It can be contrasted with associative learning, which discusses how animals form links between stimuli in the form of the strength of associations in memory. RFT argues that natural human language typically specifies not just the strength of a link between stimuli but also the type of relation as well as the dimension along which they are to be related. For example, a tennis ball could be associated with an orange, by virtue of having the same shape, but it is different because it is not edible, and is perhaps a different color. In the preceding sentence, 'same', 'different' and 'not' are cues in the environment that specify the type of relation between the stimuli, and 'shape', 'colour' and 'edible' specify the dimension along which each relation is to be made. Relational frame theory argues that while there is an arbitrary number of types of relations and number of dimensions along which stimuli can be related, the core unit of relating is an essential building block for much of what is commonly referred to as human language or higher cognition.

Relational framing is relational responding based on arbitrarily applicable relations and arbitrary stimulus functions. The relational responding is subject to mutual entailment, combinatorial mutual entailment, and transformation of stimulus functions. The relations and stimulus functions are controlled by contextual cues.

=== Contextual cues and stimulus functions ===
In human language, a word, sentence or a symbol (e.g. stimulus) can have a different meaning (e.g. functions), depending on context. In terms of RFT, it is said that in human language a stimulus can have different stimulus functions depending on contextual cues. Take these two sentences for example:

1. This task is a piece of cake.
2. Yes, I would like a piece of that delicious cake you've made.

In the sentences above, the stimulus "cake" has two different functions:

- The stimulus "cake" has a figurative function in the presence of the contextual cues "this task; is; piece of".
- Whereas in the presence of the contextual cues "I; would like; delicious; you've made", the stimulus "cake" has a more literal function.

The functions of stimuli are called stimulus functions._{func} for short. When stimulus function refers to physical properties of the stimulus, such as quantity, colour, shape, etc., they are called nonarbitrary stimulus functions. When a stimulus function refers to non-physical properties of the stimulus, such as value, they are called arbitrary stimulus functions. For example, a one dollar bill. The value of the one dollar bill is an arbitrary stimulus function, but the colour green is a nonarbitrary stimulus function of the one dollar bill.

=== Arbitrarily applicable relational responding ===
Arbitrarily applicable relational responding is a form of relational responding.

==== Relational responding ====
Relational responding is a response to one stimulus in relation to other available stimuli. For example, a lion who picks the largest piece of meat. The deer who picks the strongest male of the pack. In contrast if an animal would always pick the same drinking spot, it is not relational responding (it is not related to other stimuli in the sense of best/worst/larger/smaller, etc.). These examples of relational responding are based on the physical properties of the stimuli. When relational responding is based on the physical properties of the stimuli, such as shape, size, quantity, etc., it is called nonarbitrarily relational responding (NARR).

==== Arbitrarily applicable relational responding ====
Arbitrarily applicable relational responding refers to responding based on relations that are arbitrarily applied between the stimuli. That is to say the relations applied between the stimuli are not supported by the physical properties of said stimuli, but for example based on social convention or social whim. For example, the sound "cow" refers to the animal in the English language. But in another language the same animal is referred by a totally different sound. For example, in Dutch is called "koe" (pronounced as coo). The word "cow" or "koe" has nothing to do with the physical properties of the animal itself. It is by social convention that the animal is named this way. In terms of RFT, it is said that the relation between the word cow and the actual animal is arbitrarily applied. We can even change these arbitrarily applied relations: Just look at the history of any language, where meanings of words, symbols and complete sentence can change over time and place.

Arbitrarily applicable relational responding is responding based on arbitrarily applied relations.

=== Mutual entailment ===
Mutual entailment refers to deriving a relation between two stimuli based on a given relation between those same two stimuli: Given the relation A to B, the relation B to A can be derived.

For example, Joyce is standing in front of Peter. The relation trained is stimulus A in front of stimulus B. One can derive that Peter is behind Joyce. The derived relation is stimulus B is behind stimulus A.

Another example: Jared is older than Jacob. One could derive that Jacob is younger than Jared. Relation trained: stimulus A is older than stimulus B. Relation derived: stimulus B is younger than stimulus A.

=== Combinatorial mutual entailment ===
Combinatorial mutual entailment refers to deriving relations between two stimuli, given the relations of those two stimuli with a third stimulus: Given the relation, A to B and B to C, the relations A to C and C to A can be derived.

To go on with the examples above:

- Joyce is standing in front of Peter and Peter is standing in front of Lucy. The relations trained in this example are: stimulus A in front of B and stimulus B in front of C. With this it can be derived that Joyce is standing in front of Lucy and Lucy is standing behind Joyce. The derived relations are A is in front of C and C is behind A.
- John is older than Jared and Jared is older than Jacob. Stimulus A is older than stimulus B and stimulus B is older than stimulus C. It can be derived that Jacob is younger than Jared and Jared is younger than John. The derived relation becomes stimulus A is older than stimulus C and stimulus C is younger than stimulus A.

Notice that the relations between A and C were never given. They can be derived from the other relations.

=== Transfer and transformation of stimulus function ===
A stimulus can have different functions depending on contextual cues. However, a stimulus function can change based on the arbitrary relations with that stimulus.

For example, this relational frame: A is more than B and B is more than C.

For now, the stimulus functions of these letters are rather neutral. But as soon as C would be labeled 'as very valuable' and 'nice to have', then A would become more attractive than C, based on the relations. Before there was stated anything about C being valuable, A had a rather neutral stimulus function. After giving C an attractive stimulus function, A has become attractive. The attractive stimulus function has been transferred from C to A through the relations between A, B and C. And A has had a transformation of stimulus function from neutral to attractive.

The same can be done with aversive stimulus function as danger instead of valuable, in saying that C is dangerous, A becomes more dangerous than C based on the relations.

== Research and reception ==
Approximately 300 studies have tested RFT ideas. Supportive data exists in the areas needed to show that an action is "operant" such as the importance of multiple examples in training derived relational responding, the role of context, and the importance of consequences. Derived relational responding has also been shown to alter other behavioral processes such as classical conditioning, an empirical result that RFT theorists point to in explaining why relational operants modify existing behavioristic interpretations of complex human behavior. Empirical advances have also been made by RFT researchers in the analysis and understanding of such topics as metaphor, perspective taking, and reasoning.

Several hundred studies have explored many testable aspects and implications of the theory in terms of:

- The emergence of specific frames in childhood.
- How individual frames can be combined to create verbally complex phenomena such as metaphors and analogies.
- How the rigidity or automaticity of relating within certain domains is related to psychopathology.

Proponents of RFT often indicate the failure to establish a vigorous experimental program in language and cognition as the key reason why behavior analysis fell out of the mainstream of psychology despite its many contributions, and argue that RFT might provide a way forward. The theory is still somewhat controversial within behavioral psychology, however. At the current time the controversy is not primarily empirical since RFT studies publish regularly in mainstream behavioral journals and few empirical studies have yet claimed to contradict RFT findings. Rather the controversy seems to revolve around whether RFT is a positive step forward, especially given that its implications seem to go beyond many existing interpretations and extensions from within this intellectual tradition.

== Applications ==
=== Acceptance and commitment therapy ===
RFT has been argued to be central to the development of the psychotherapeutic tradition known as acceptance and commitment therapy and clinical behavior analysis more generally. Indeed, the psychologist Steven C Hayes was involved with the creation of both acceptance and commitment therapy and RFT, and has credited them as inspirations for one another. However, the extent and exact nature of the interaction between RFT as basic behavioral science and applications such as ACT has been an ongoing point of discussion within the field.

=== Gender constructs ===
Queer theorist and ACT therapist Alex Stitt observed how relational frames within a person's language development inform their cognitive associations pertaining to gender identity, gender role, and gender expression. How rigid or flexible a person is with their relational frames, Stitt proposed, will determine how adaptable their concept of gender is within themselves, and how open they are to gender diversity. Children, for example, may adhere to the rigid hierarchical frame "males are boys, and boys have short hair" leading to the false inference that anyone who has short hair is male. Likewise, children may adhere to oppositional frames, leading to false notions like the opposite of a lemon is a lime, the opposite of a cat is a dog, or the opposite of a man is a woman. Stitt observes that adults struggling with gender related issues within themselves, often hyperfocus on causal frames in an attempt to explain gender variance, or frames of comparison and distinction, potentially resulting in feelings of isolation and alienation.

=== Autism spectrum disorder ===
RFT provides conceptual and procedural guidance for enhancing the cognitive and language development capability (through its detailed treatment and analysis of derived relational responding and the transformation of function) of early intensive behavior intervention (EIBI) programs for young children with autism and related disorders. The Promoting the Emergence of Advanced Knowledge (PEAK) Relational Training System is heavily influenced by RFT.

=== Evolution science ===
More recently, RFT has also been proposed as a way to guide discussion of language processes within evolution science, whether within evolutionary biology or evolutionary psychology, toward a more informed understanding of the role of language in shaping human social behavior. The effort at integrating RFT into evolution science has been led by, among others, Steven C. Hayes, a co-developer of RFT, and David Sloan Wilson, an evolutionary biologist at Binghamton University. For example, in 2011, Hayes presented at a seminar at Binghamton, on the topic of "Symbolic Behavior, Behavioral Psychology, and the Clinical Importance of Evolution Science", while Wilson likewise presented at a symposium at the annual conference in Parma, Italy, of the Association for Contextual Behavioral Science, the parent organization sponsoring RFT research, on the topic of "Evolution for Everyone, Including Contextual Psychology". Hayes, Wilson, and colleagues have recently linked RFT to the concept of a symbotype and an evolutionarily sensible way that relational framing could have developed has been described.

== See also ==
- Cognitive grammar
- Cognitive linguistics
- Construction grammar
- Constructivism (psychological school)
- Embodied cognitive science
- Enactivism
- Image schema
- Operant conditioning
- Personal construct theory
- Schema (psychology)
- Situated cognition
