= Bronwyn =

Bronwyn is a variant of the Welsh feminine name Bronwen/Branwen, literally meaning "White Raven (or Crow)" or, abstractly, "White Breast" (from bran, raven, and bron ("breast") and [g]wen ("white, fair, blessed)". Because the suffix -wyn is grammatically masculine in Welsh, Bronwyn is a spelling generally only used for female names in the English-speaking world outside Wales. The name may refer to:

== People ==
- Bronwyn Bancroft (born 1958), Australian artist
- Bronwyn Bishop (born 1942), Australian politician
- Bronwyn Calver (born 1969), Australian cricketer
- Bronwyn Carlton, American comic book editor and radio DJ
- Bronwyn Cox (born 1997), Australian Olympic rower
- Bronwyn Curtis, British Australian economist
- Bronwyn Dibb (born 1997), New Zealand trampoline gymnast
- Bronwyn Donaghy (1948–2002), Australian non-fiction author
- Bronwyn Drainie (born 1945), Canadian journalist
- Bronwyn Eagles (born 1980), Australian athlete
- Bronwyn Elsmore, New Zealand writer and playwright
- Bronwyn Evans, Australian engineer
- Bronwyn Eyre (born 1971), Canadian provincial politician
- Bronwyn Fredericks, Indigenous Australian academic
- Bronwyn Fox, Australian scientist
- Bronwyn Gillanders, Australian marine scientist
- Bronwyn Griffin, Canadian vocalist and songwriter for the synth-pop duo Electric Youth
- Bronwyn Halfpenny (born 1963), Australian politician
- Bronwyn Hall, American professor of economics
- Bronwyn Harch (born 1969), Australian statistician
- Bronwyn Hayward, New Zealand political scientist
- Bronwyn Hemsley, Australian speech pathologist
- Bronwyn Hill (born 1960), British civil servant
- Bronwyn Holloway-Smith (born 1982), New Zealand artist and author
- Bronwyn James (born 1994), English actress
- Bronwyn Katz (born 1993), South African sculptor and visual artist
- Bronwyn Keith-Hynes, American fiddle player
- Bronwyn Kidd (born 1969), Australian photographer
- Bronwyn King, Australian radiation oncologist and anti-tobacco campaigner
- Bronwyn Labrum, New Zealand cultural historian and author
- Bronwyn Laidlaw (born 1974), Australian rugby player
- Bronwyn Law-Viljoen, South African writer, editor, publisher and professor
- Bronwyn Lea (born 1969), Australian writer
- Bronwyn Lundberg, American digital artist and painter
- Bronwyn Mackintosh (born 1970), Australian rugby union player
- Bronwyn Marshall (born 1963), Australian basketball player
- Bronwyn Mayer (born 1974), Australian water polo player
- Bronwyn McGahan, Irish politician
- Bronwyn Newport (born 1985), American television personality and fashion blogger
- Bronwyn Nielsen (born 1972), South African broadcaster and media executive
- Bronwyn Oliver (1959–2006), Australian sculptor
- Bronwyn Parry, Australian academic and carpenter
- Bronwyn Pike (born 1956), Australian politician
- Bronwyn Roye (born 1970), Australian rower
- Bronwyn "Bronnie" Taylor, Australian politician
- Bronwyn Thompson (born 1973), Australian athlete
- Bronwyn Turei (born 1984), New Zealand actress and singer
- Bronwyn Wake, Australian natural scientist
- Bronwyn Williams, literary alias of American historical romance novel writer Dixie Browning
- Bronwyn Wilson, New Zealand Olympic Taekwondo competitor
- Gladys Bronwyn Stern (1890–1973), English novelist and literary critic
- Lisa Bronwyn Moore, Canadian film and television actress

== Disambiguation pages ==
- Bronwyn Jones (disambiguation)

== Fictional characters ==
- Bronwyn from the fifth season of the American horror anthology television series American Horror Story
- Bronwyn from the American fantasy television series The Lord of the Rings: The Rings of Power
- Bronwyn Davies from the Australian television series Neighbours
- Bronwyn Moir, a villain in the 2019 comic series Chrononauts: Futureshock
