= Stuart Vyse =

American psychologist specializing in superstition and irrational behavior (born 1950)

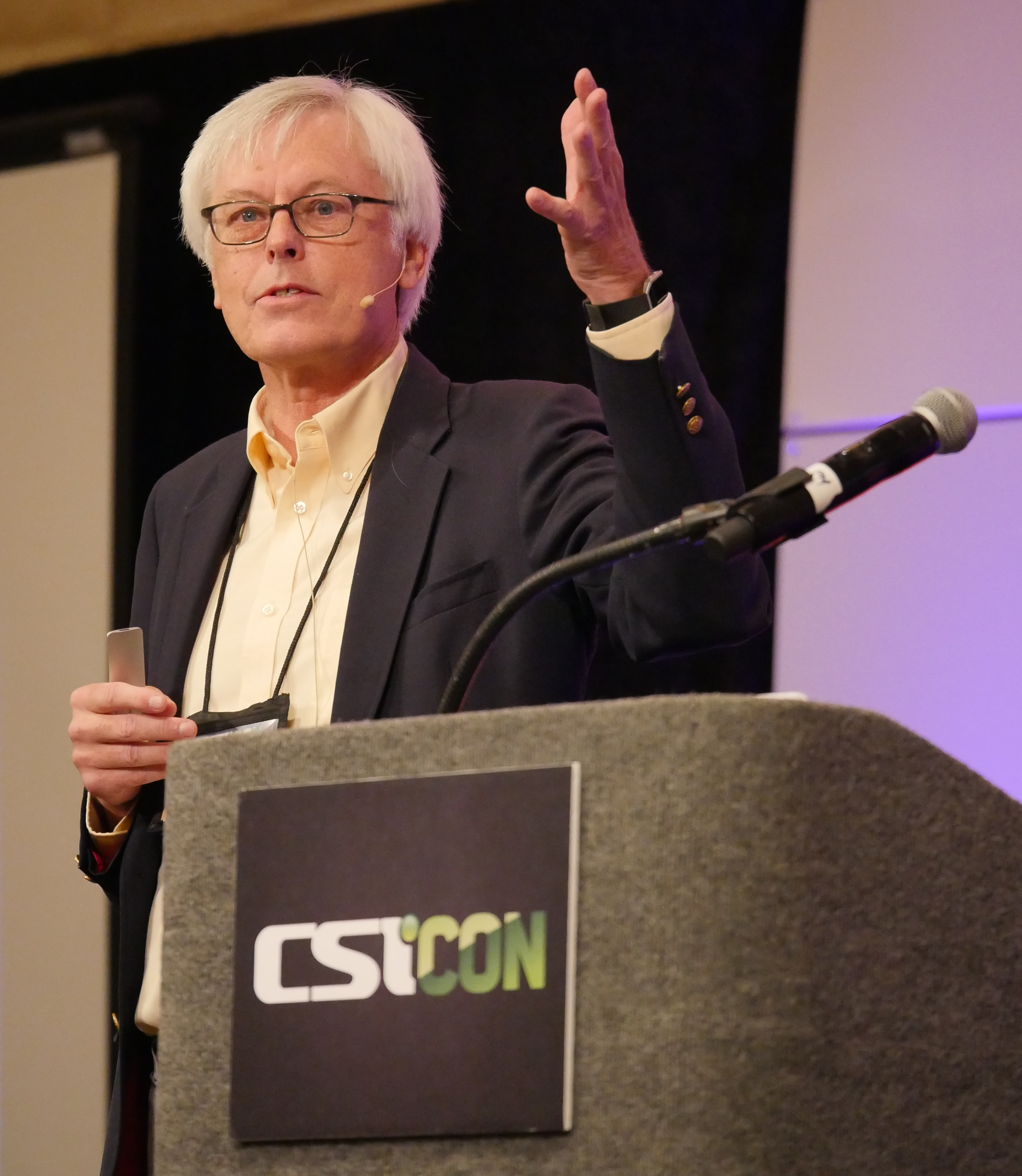
- Born: November 18, 1950 (age 75); Evanston, Illinois
- Occupations: Behavioral scientist, teacher, writer
- Known for: Expertise on belief in the supernatural
- Awards: 1999 William James Book Award for Believing in Magic.

Academic background
- Education: University of Rhode Island
- Thesis: The effects of methylphenidate on learning in children with attention deficit disorder: The stimulus equivalence paradigm (1989)

Academic work
- Discipline: Psychology
- Sub-discipline: Behavioral science
- Institutions: Connecticut College; Providence College; University of Rhode Island
- Notable works: Believing in Magic: The Psychology of Superstition (2013); Going Broke: Why Americans (Still) Can't Hold On To Their Money (2018)
- Website: stuartvyse.com

Stuart Vyse is an American psychologist, teacher, speaker and author who specializes in belief in superstitions and critical thinking. He is frequently invited as a speaker and interviewed by the media as an expert on superstitious behavior. His book Believing in Magic: The Psychology of Superstition won the American Psychological Association's William James Book Award. He is a fellow of the American Psychological Association.

== Education and teaching ==
Vyse earned his B.A. and M.A. in English at Southern Illinois University Carbondale. He went on to earn an M.A. and a Ph.D. in psychology at the University of Rhode Island. He taught at Connecticut College from 1987 to 2015, where he has been Joanne Toor Cummings '50 Professor. He also taught at Providence College and the University of Rhode Island. He mentions that living near the campus of the University of Illinois Urbana-Champaign, where his mother was completing a college degree, probably spurred his interest in academia.

Vyse has served on the editorial boards of The Analysis of Verbal Behavior, The Behavior Analyst, and The Psychological Record (all journals primarily focused on applied behavior analysis and other forms of radical behaviorism). He has been on the editorial board of Skeptic magazine since 1997, and since 2015 he has written the “Behavior & Belief” column for Skeptical Inquirer magazine, where he is also a contributing editor. Vyse is also a contributor to a website dedicated to educating parents and others about the scientifically discredited facilitated communication technique.

He holds fellowships in three organizations: The Association for Psychological Science, the Committee for Skeptical Inquiry and, as of 2025, the American Psychological Association. He cites Carl Sagan and Stephen Jay Gould as influences in his role as science communicator.

As of 2022, Vyse has been living in Stonington, Connecticut for two decades, in a building that used to be called the Steamboat Hotel, a landmark of historical value in the community. His research into the building's past and its successive inhabitants became the basis of a book, Stonington's Steamboat Hotel, which was released in October 2022.

== Superstition and critical thinking ==
Vyse believes superstitions come from a need to have some measure of control over events people hope will happen, or seek to avoid. This behavior is reinforced by the tendency of the human brain to detect patterns in events, even when they're completely due to chance. That motivates people to attribute a favorable outcome to a good-luck charm, for instance. Finding a way to control the outcome of an uncertain situation brings some comfort. While this behavior may help reduce anxiety, it may also cause people to gamble excessively, to base decisions on unreliable techniques such as fortune-telling or to endanger their health, for example by using homeopathy rather than actual medication.

Vyse suspects superstition may be on the rise, due to a large amount of false information circulating on the internet and insufficient critical thinking skills. According to Vyse, "There's a willingness to accept almost anything, which is unfortunate, and promotes superstition." As a skeptic, he has advocated for public policies based on science and has been critical of populist heads of state, such as Donald Trump and Jair Bolsonaro.

He used to teach a college-level seminar on critical thinking, logical fallacies and debate argumentation. He has been critical of medical treatments and techniques based on pseudoscience, such as facilitated communication.

Remarking that superstitions are often passed on from parents to their children, Vyse stated that his family, who were Protestant, did not indulge in superstition when he was growing up and he was never superstitious himself.

== Books and book chapters ==
- Vyse, Stuart (2022). Stonington's Steamboat Hotel. History Press. ISBN 978-1467152952.
- Vyse, Stuart (2022). The Uses of Delusion: Why It's Not Always Rational to Be Rational. Oxford University Press. ISBN 978-0190079857.
- Vyse, Stuart (2020). Superstition: A Very Short Introduction. Oxford: Oxford University Press. ISBN 978-0198819257.
- Vyse, Stuart (2018). "Chapter 8: The Environment and Consumer Behavior". In Sloan Devlin, Ann (ed.). Environmental Psychology and Human Well-Being: Effects of Built and Natural Settings. Academic Press. ISBN 978-0128114810.
- Vyse, Stuart (2015). "Chapter 1: Where Do Fads Come From?". In Foxx, Richard M. (ed.). Controversial Therapies for Autism and Intellectual Disabilities: Fad, Fashion, and Science in Professional Practice, 2nd Edition. Routledge. ISBN 978-1315754345.
- Vyse, Stuart (2018). Going Broke: Why Americans (still) Can't Hold On To Their Money (Updated ed.). New York: Oxford University Press. ISBN 978-0190677848.
- Vyse, Stuart (2013). Believing in Magic: The Psychology of Superstition (Updated ed.). New York: Oxford University Press. ISBN 978-0199996926.

Vyse was awarded the 1999 William James Book Award by the American Psychological Association for Believing in Magic.

== Selected journal publications ==
- Vyse, Stuart; Hemsley, Bronwyn; Lang, Russell; O. Lilienfeld, Scott; P. Mostert, Mark; D. Schlinger, Henry; Shane, Howard; Sherry, Mark; James, Todd (January 2019). "Whose words are these? Statements derived from Facilitated Communication and Rapid Prompting Method undermine the credibility of Jaswal & Akhtar's social motivation hypotheses". Behavioral and Brain Sciences. 42 e113. doi:10.1017/S0140525X18002236. S2CID 200018163 – via ResearchGate.
- Vyse, Stuart (July 2018). "Superstition, Ethics, and Transformative Consumer Research". Journal of the Association for Consumer Research. 3 (4): 582–590. doi:10.1086/698869. S2CID 158721038 – via ResearchGate.
- Vyse, Stuart (January 2018). "What's a Therapist to do When Clients have Pseudoscientific Beliefs?". The Behavior Therapist. 41: 36–39 – via ResearchGate.
- Vyse, Stuart (2014). "The Science of Consequences: How They Affect Genes, Change the Brain, and Impact Our World". The Behavior Analyst. 37 (1): 57–59. doi:10.1007/s40614-013-0001-y. PMC 4883450.
- Vyse, Stuart (2013). "Changing Course". The Behavior Analyst. 36 (1): 123–135. doi:10.1007/BF03392295. PMC 3640877. PMID 25729135.
- Jayne Wyman, Alyssa; Vyse, Stuart (2008). "Science Versus the Stars: A Double-Blind Test of the Validity of the NEO Five-Factor Inventory and Computer-Generated Astrological Natal Charts". The Journal of General Psychology. 135 (3): 287–300. doi:10.3200/GENP.135.3.287-300. PMID 18649494. S2CID 19661869 – via ResearchGate.
- Vyse, Stuart (2004). "Stability over time: Is behavior analysis a trait psychology?". The Behavior Analyst. 27 (1): 43–53. doi:10.1007/BF03392091. PMC 2755368. PMID 22478416.

== Other publications ==
- Vyse, Stuart (2020). Critical Thinking: How to Effectively Reason, Understand Irrationality, and Make Better Decisions. Findaway World: Learn25. ISBN 978-1632517777. OCLC 1175589323.
