= A. Charles Catania =

American psychologist

Anthony Charles Catania
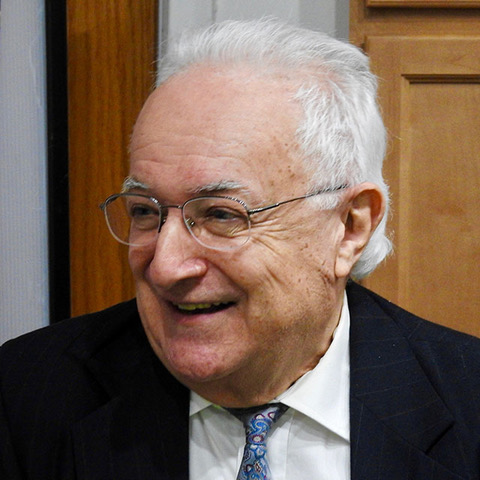
- Born: June 22, 1936 (age 90); New York, NY, United States
- Children: 2, including Kenneth C. Catania
- Awards: ABAI Distinguished Service to Behavior Analysis Award; Murray Sidman Award for Enduring Contribution to Applied Behavior Analysis; Victor G. Laties Award for Lifetime Service; SEAB Don F. Hake Award for Translational Research
- Scientific career
- Fields: Behavior analysis

Anthony Charles Catania (born June 22, 1936) is an American researcher in behavior analysis known for his theoretical, experimental, and applied work. He is an Emeritus professor of psychology at the University of Maryland, Baltimore County (UMBC), where he taught and conducted research for 35 years prior to his retirement in 2008. He received a B.A. (1957) and M.A. (1958) at Columbia University in Psychology. He received his Ph.D. in Psychology at Harvard University in 1961. He remained at Harvard to conduct research as a postdoctoral researcher in B. F. Skinner's laboratory. Prior to his career at UMBC, he held a faculty position for nearly a decade at New York University (NYU).

He studies the behavior of both human and nonhuman animals. He has written over 200 journal articles and book chapters, has edited or co-edited six books, and has written two textbooks on learning. Topics on which he has published include schedules of reinforcement, human verbal behavior, and the history of behavior analysis.

Related to his professional interests in learning and verbal behavior, since 2022 Catania has participated in a published series of one-on-one conversations with linguist and political activist Noam Chomsky. Topics discussed include the history of cognitive science and scientific and philosophical disputes concerning verbal behavior.

At UMBC, Catania founded the graduate-level (MA) program in Applied Behavior Analysis.

Catania was the chief editor at the Journal of the Experimental Analysis of Behavior (1966–69) and served as an associate editor at several journals, including Behavioral and Brain Sciences, Behaviorism, and the European Journal of Behavior Analysis. He served as President of the Maryland Association for Behavior Analysis. He twice served as President of the Society for the Experimental Analysis of Behavior (SEAB; from 1966-1967 and 1981–83) and as President of the Association for Behavior Analysis [now Association for Behavior Analysis International (ABAI)], from 1981 to 1984. He is a Fellow of Divisions 3, 6, 25, and 28 of the American Psychological Association (APA) and served as President of Division 25 from 1996 to 1998.

He resides in Columbia, Maryland.
