= Billy Koen =

American engineer (1938–2025)

Billy Vaughn Koen
- Born: May 2, 1938; Graham, Texas, U.S.
- Died: October 9, 2025 (aged 87); Austin, Texas, U.S.
- Scientific career
- Fields: Nuclear engineering, chemical engineering
- Institutions: Department of Mechanical Engineering, The University of Texas at Austin

Billy Vaughn Koen (May 2, 1938 – October 9, 2025) was an American nuclear and chemical engineer, author and academic who was a professor in the Department of Mechanical Engineering, The University of Texas at Austin, where he taught for over 41 years.

== Life and research ==
Billy Koen was born on May 2, 1938. He received a BA in Chemistry and BS in Chemical Engineering from the University of Texas at Austin in 1960 and 1961, and Diplôme d'Ingénieur en Génie Atomique from the Institut national des sciences et techniques nucléaires, Saclay, France in 1963. He received his MS in 1962 and ScD in 1968 in nuclear engineering from the Massachusetts Institute of Technology.

He was a consultant to the French Atomic Energy Commission in 1971 to 1972 and 1976 to 1977. Billy Koen was a visiting professor at the Tokyo Institute of Technology (東京工業大学) in 1994, 1998 to 1999, and 2001. He was a fellow of the American Nuclear Society. Koen held numerous offices in the American Society for Engineering Education (ASEE), including vice-president for Public Affairs. Koen was a Fellow of ASEE, and received several awards including the Chester F. Carlson award for innovation, the W. Leighton Collins award for service to engineering education, and the IEEE Centennial Medal.

Koen died on October 9, 2025, at the age of 87.

== Selected publications ==
In nuclear engineering and artificial intelligence (AI), Koen pioneered the use of AI in solving complex reactor safety issues and oversaw the research of a large number of graduate students. Representative publications:

- Hansen, K.F., Koen, B.V., Little, W.W., "Stable Numerical Solutions of the Reactor Kinetics Equations" Nuc. Sci. & Eng., 22, 51-59 (1965).
- Koen, B.V., "Méthodes Nouvelles Pour L'Evaluation de la Fiabilité: Reconnaissance des Formes," Commissariat à L'Energie Atomique, Rapport CEA-4368, Juin, 1972, (English Translation: "New Methods for the Evaluation of Reliability: Pattern Recognition").
- Macdonald, J.L., Koen, B.V., "Application of Artificial Intelligence Techniques to Digital Computer Control of Nuclear Reactors," Nuc. Sci. & Eng., Vol. 56, No. 2, Feb. 1975, pp. 14251

In 1969, Koen introduced to engineering education the self-paced Personalized System of Instruction (PSI or Keller Plan) as an alternative teaching method. In 2000, he adapted it to a web-based class. Representative publications:

- Koen, B.V., "Self-Paced Instruction for Engineering Students," Eng. Educ., Vol. 60, No. 7, March, 1970.
- Koen, Billy V., "Determining Unit Structure in a PSI Course," Event 1725, American Society for Engineering Education Annual Meeting, June 19–22, 1972.
- Koen, Billy V., Heger, A. Sharif, "Evaluation of an Introductory Self-Paced Nuclear Course - Twenty Two Years Later," Transactions of the American Nuclear Society, June 20–24, 1993.
- Koen, B.V., "Creation of a Sense of 'Presence' in a Web-Based Course: The Search for Mark Hopkins' Log in a Digital World," Invited Paper for Special Issue of IEEE Transactions on Education on Web-Based Instruction, November, 2005, Vol. 48, No. 4, pp. 599–604.

For over forty years, Koen created, developed, and taught to engineering and non-engineering students the Theory of Engineering Design in terms of heuristics. Representative publications:

- Koen, B.V., "Engineering Method," Ethics, Science, Technology, and Engineering: A Global Resource 2nd edition, J. Britt Holbrook and Carl Mitcham, editors, Farmington Hills, MI: Macmillan Reference, 2015. Vol. 2, pp. 90–92.
- Koen, B.V., "Toward a Definition of the Engineering Method," Proceedings of the ASEE-IEEE Frontiers in Education Conference, Oct. 3–5, 1984, Philadelphia, Pa., pp. 544–549. (Won the Ben Dasher Best Paper Award for 1984.)
- Koen, B.V., "The Engineering Method and Its Implications for Scientific, Philosophical, and Universal Methods," The Monist, vol. 92, no. 3, essay 3, July 2009.
- Koen, B.V., "An Engineer's Quest for Universal Method," Norms, Knowledge, and Reasoning in Technology Conference, June 3–4, 2005, Boxmeer, The Netherlands, sponsored by the Philosophy and Ethics of Technology Department, Technical University of Eindhoven, Netherlands.

== In popular culture ==
Koen was the subject of "KOENTMND", an internet meme, or "fad", that prominently featured recordings from Koen's lectures at The University of Texas at Austin. The meme gained popularity in 2006, after one of Koen's students posted an audio recording of him to YTMND, an internet meme community, saying,

Can you believe it? You've already finished C. Do you think you can do MATLAB?

== Publications ==
- Koen, Billy Vaughn, Discussion of the Method: Conducting the Engineer's Approach to Problem Solving, Oxford University Press, March, 2003.
- Koen, Billy V. and Shimizu, Yasutaka, Heuristics for Internationally Distributed Collaboration Between Japan and the U.S.: A User's Manual, 国 際 的 に 拡 充 さ れ た 共 同 活 動 の 体 得 則 実 践 者 マ ニ ュ ア ル Japan Industry and Management of Technology Program, The University of Texas at Austin, 2001.
- Koen, Billy V., El Método De Ingeniería, Universidad del Valle, Colombia, Presentacion a la Edicion Especial de ACOFI, September 19–22, 2000, Cartagena, Colombia.
- Koen, B.V., Definition of the Engineering Method, monograph of the American Society for Engineering Education, 1985. (Recipient of the ASEE Olmsted Award in 1987)
