= Sigrid S. Glenn =

Behavior analyst and researcher of metacontingencies

Sigrid S. Glenn is a conceptual behavior analyst, researcher, and founder of the first-ever department of behavior analysis. As a researcher, her most notable contribution is the concept of metacontingencies, a unit of analysis that allows researchers to study culture using a behavioral contingencies framework.

== Career ==
Glenn was introduced to behavior analysis in 1969 by Donald Whaley, who was the first psychology faculty member at North Texas State University (now the University of North Texas [UNT]). Glenn continued her studies until graduating with a PhD in clinical psychology. Initially, Glenn focused on clinical work with individuals with developmental disabilities, including autism. She worked at the Center for Behavioral Studies at North Texas State and the Behavior Exchange Clinic.

In 1985, Glenn focused on developing the Department of Behavior Analysis at UNT. Glenn was the program's founding chair. She developed the master's and bachelor's programs in behavior analysis and led the faculty in developing the first online program in behavior analysis to be approved as a course sequence by the Behavior Analyst Certification Board. As she taught courses, Glenn began thinking about conceptual issues in behavior analysis, which led to development of metacontingencies. She conducted research and published numerous papers on the topic, and later established the Behavior and Culture Lab at UNT.

Glenn is past president of the Association for Behavior Analysis International and the Texas Association for Behavior Analysis. Over her career, Glenn served as an editorial board member of seven behavior analytic journals, including editor of The Behavior Analyst.

== Awards and honors ==
- American Psychological Association Division 25: Fellow
- Society for the Advancement of Behavior Analysis: Distinguished Service to Behavior Analysis
- Association for Behavior Analysis International: Fellow
- California Association for Behavior Analysis: Outstanding Contributions to Behavior Analysis

== Selected works ==
- Glenn, S., Malott, M., Andery, M., Benvenuti, M., Ramona, H., Sandaker, I., Todorov, J., Tourinho, E., & Vasconcelos, L. (2020). Toward Consistent Terminology in a Behaviorist Approach to Cultural Analysis (pp. 23–41). https://doi.org/10.1007/978-3-030-45421-0_2
- Glenn, S. S. (1988). Contingencies and Metacontingencies: Toward a Synthesis of Behavior Analysis and Cultural Materialism. The Behavior Analyst, 11(2), 161–179. https://doi.org/10.1007/BF03392470
- Glenn, S. S. (2004). Individual behavior, culture, and social change. The Behavior Analyst, 27(2), 133–151. https://doi.org/10.1007/BF03393175
