= Charles Ferster =

American behavioral psychologist

Charles Bohris Ferster
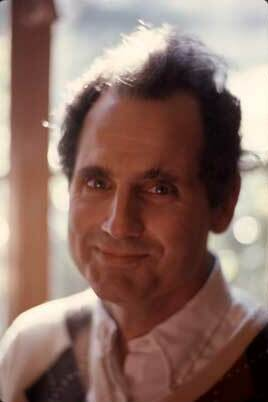
- C.B. Ferster (circa 1972) (Photo by Doug Katz)
- Born: November 1, 1922; Freehold, New Jersey
- Died: February 3, 1981 (aged 58); Washington, D.C.
- Education: Columbia University
- Known for: Behavior analysis, Schedules of reinforcement
- Spouses: Marilyn Ferster; Elyce Zenoff Ferster
- Scientific career
- Fields: Psychology
- Workplaces: Georgetown University; American University

Charles Bohris Ferster (1 November 1922 – 3 February 1981) was an American behavioral psychologist. A pioneer of applied behavior analysis, he developed errorless learning and was a colleague of B.F. Skinner's at Harvard University, co-authoring the book Schedules of Reinforcement (1957).

== Career ==
Ferster received his bachelor's degree at Rutgers University in 1947 followed by his Master's in 1948 and Ph.D. in 1958 from Columbia University. He then worked as a colleague with B. F. Skinner at Harvard University, where they established the Journal of the Experimental Analysis of Behavior in 1958. While at Harvard, he devised errorless learning to train animals, and used other forms of what was then termed behavior modification for clients with depression and obesity. While serving as an assistant professor of psychology at Indiana University School of Medicine from 1957 to 1962, Ferster employed errorless learning to instruct young autistic children how to speak.

Ferster's research also influenced the work of other pioneers of behavioral research, such as Donald M. Baer and Sidney Bijou, who together founded the Journal of Applied Behavior Analysis at the University of Kansas. Another well-known researcher was Ivar Lovaas, who applied Ferster's procedures to autistic children at the University of California, Los Angeles (UCLA) and developed early intensive behavioral intervention (EIBI), or 8 hours per day of what he called, "discrete trial training" (DTT).

== Early childhood and family life ==
Ferster was born November 1, 1922, in Freehold, New Jersey, the second son of Julius Ferster (1894–1969) and Mollie Ferster née Madwin (1895–1966), both Jewish immigrants from Poland (The Russian Empire, 1910 and 1912, respectively).

He was married to Marilyn Ferster, with whom he had four children—Bill, Andrea, Sam and Warren. He later married Elyce Zenoff Ferster, a professor of law at George Washington University,

Ferster died of a heart attack on February 3, 1981, at the age of 58 in Washington, D.C.

== Timeline ==
Education

- 1940–1943 Rutgers University (New Brunswick, NJ)
- 1943–1946 Military Service
- 1946–1947 Rutgers University (New Brunswick, NJ) (B.S, 1947)
- 1947–1950 Columbia University (New York, NY) (M.A., 1948; Ph.D., 1950)

Post-doctoral professional affiliations

- 1950–1955 Harvard University (Cambridge, MA) Research Fellow under B.F. Skinner
- 1955–1957 Yerkes Laboratory (Atlanta, GA at Emory University)(Chimpanzee work)
- 1957–1962 Indiana University Medical Center (Indianapolis, IN) (work with autistic children; collaboration with Nurnberger & Brady)
- 1958 - First Executive Editor, Journal of the Experimental Analysis of Behavior (JEAB); See Founding of the Journal of the Experimental Analysis of Behavior
- 1962–1963 Executive Director, Institute for Behavioral Research (Silver Spring, MD)
- 1963–1965 Associate Director, Institute for Behavioral Research (Silver Spring, MD)
- 1965–1968 Senior Research Associate, Institute for Behavioral Research (Silver Spring, MD)
- 1967–1968 Professor of Psychology, Georgetown University (Washington, DC)
- 1969–1981 Professor of Psychology, American University (Washington, DC) (department chair, 1970–1973)

== Professional life ==
Journal of the Experimental Analysis of Behavior

== Laboratory work ==
The Skinner box is not a specific technique, but rather a method of research employing the free operant. The use of the free operant is a method of wide generality; it refers to any apparatus that generates a response which takes a short time to occur and leaves the animal in the same place ready to respond again. The free operant is used in experiments when the main dependent variable is the frequency of occurrence of behavior. Nearly all the problems of a science of behavior fit this paradigm when the questions are of the form: what is the likelihood of a piece of behavior occurring on this particular occasion; how strong is the tendency to behave on this occasion relative to another occasion? The free operant has advantages in this respect, because it removes restrictions on the frequency with which a response can occur and permits the observation of moment-to-moment changes in frequency.

C.B. Ferster, The use of the free operant in the analysis of behavior, 1953 Psychological Bulletin, 50, 263-274.

Meanwhile I had set up a pigeon laboratory in which Charles Ferster and I worked very happily together for more than 5 years. It was the high point in my research history. Scarcely a week went by without some exciting discovery. Perhaps the behavior we dealt with most effectively was our own. Near the end of our collaboration we found ourselves with a vast quantity of unanalyzed and unpublished data, and we proceeded to design an environment in which we could scarcely help writing a book. In it we both worked as we had never worked before. In one spring term and one long hot summer we wrote a text and a glossary and prepared over 1000 figures, more than 900 of which were published.

B.F. Skinner, (Untitled Article)

I don’t remember any experiment being called ‘‘great’’ or ‘‘bad’’ or anyone being given credit for doing something especially useful or valuable. Some experiments led to further planning, new apparatus, exciting conversations, new theoretical arrangements of data and procedures or a rush to tell everyone about them, while others enabled less behavior of this kind. I don’t know whether Skinner was conscious of the lack of personal praise in interpersonal relations in the laboratory. I certainly was not. My behavior was generated by the natural reinforcement of the laboratory activity. But some of the graduate students found the absence of personal support difficult.

C.B. Ferster (1970). Schedules of reinforcement with Skinner. In P. B. Dews (Ed.), Festschrift for B. F. Skinner

(pp. 37–46 at 43). New York: Irvington.

== Application of the theory ==
- Linwood Project
- Individualized Instruction at Georgetown, American Universities
- The University Learning Center at American University: this represented a radical experiment in undergraduate, interdisciplinary education in which the principles of operant behavior were directly applied. The center itself—an open, free-flowing physical space on campus—was conceived of as the "chamber" in which instruction and learning occurred. The environment adhered in obvious ways to such cornerstone concepts as immediate positive reinforcement, successive approximation, schedules of reinforcement, discriminative stimuli and the like. Professors of Psychology, Physics, Anthropology, Psychiatry, Sociology, Philosophy, Mathematics staffed the Learning Center, as did many graduate students in these fields.

== Social and professional network ==
Following is a partial list of professional colleagues and friends of Charles Ferster; those interested in behaviorism, operant conditioning, and human behavior more generally may be interested in these people and their work:

Margaret J. Rioch, David McK. Rioch, John L. Cameron, James Dinsmoor, Douglas G. Anger, James E. Anliker, Donald S. Blough, Richard J. Herrnstein, Alfredo V. Lagmay, William H. Morse, Nathan H. Azrin, Ogden R. Lindsley, Lewis R. Gollub, Matthew L. Israel, Harlan L. Lane, George S. Reynolds, A. Charles Catania, Herbert S. Terrace, Neil J. Peterson. William N. Schoenfeld

== Written works ==
Books

- Schedules of Reinforcement, with B.F. Skinner, 1957 ISBN 0-13-792309-0.
- An Introduction to the Science of Human Behavior, with Nurnberger, J. I. & Brady, J. P., 1963
- Behavior Principles, with Mary Carol Perott, 1968; (Second Edition 1981, with Stuart A. Culbertson)

Articles

- Arbitrary and Natural Reinforcement 1967, The Psychological Record, 22, 1–16
- An Experimental Analysis of Clinical Phenomena 1972, The Psychological Record, 22, 1-16 [citation incorrect]
- Clinical Reinforcement 1972, Seminars in Psychiatry, 4(2), 110–111
- A Laboratory Model of Psychotherapy 1979, In P. Sjoden (Ed), Trends in Behavior Therapy. New York, Academic Press
- Psychotherapy from the standpoint of a behaviorist, 1972, In J.D. Keehn (Ed.), Psychopathology in Animals: research and clinical implications. New York, Academic Press
- The Autistic Child
- Positive Reinforcement and Behavioral Deficits of Autistic Children, Child Development 1961, 32:437-456
- The use of the free operant in the analysis of behavior, 1953 Psychological Bulletin, 50, 263–274.
- The Development of Performances in Autistic Children in an Automatically Controlled Environment, Charles B. Ferster, Marian K. DeMyer, Journal of Chronic Diseases 1961 Apr; 13:312-4
- A functional analysis of depression, American Psychologist 1973, 857–870.
- The control of eating, In J. P. Foreyt (Ed.), Behavioral treatments of obesity (pp. 309–326). Oxford: Pergamon Press. Ferster, C. B., Nurnberger, J. I. & Levitt, E. E. (1977).
