= Russell Skiba =

American educational psychologist

Russell John Skiba
- Education: University of Minnesota
- Awards: Push for Excellence Award from Rainbow/PUSH, 2011 School Psychology Review article of the year award
- Scientific career
- Fields: Educational psychology, educational research
- Workplaces: Indiana University
- Thesis: Accuracy and representativeness of behavioral observation as a function of sampling strategy and type of behavior (1987)
- Doctoral advisor: Stan Deno

Russell John Skiba is an American educational psychologist known for researching school discipline and school violence. He is a professor in the school psychology program at Indiana University, where he directs PBIS Indiana, a program aimed at developing a network of Positive Behavior Interventions and Supports across Indiana. He also co-directs Indiana University's Equity Project, which aims to provide evidence regarding zero-tolerance policies, educational equity, and school violence to policymakers, and directs the Discipline Disparities Research to Practice Collaborative, a group aimed at bringing researchers together with policymakers to address disproportionality in school discipline. He has received the Push for Excellence Award from Rainbow/PUSH for his work on racial disproportionality in school suspensions.

== Education ==
Skiba received his M.A. and Ph.D. in educational psychology from the University of Minnesota in 1983 and 1987, respectively.

== Work ==
Skiba is known for his work on school discipline and how it is affected by student race. In 2002, for example, he published a study showing that black students tended to be disciplined for more subjective offenses than were white students. In 2008, Skiba was the lead author of a task force report on zero-tolerance policies in schools released by the American Psychological Association. The report concluded that these policies were not only ineffective, but also counterproductive, in that they increased the chances of future student misbehavior.
