= James A Dinsmoor =

American psychologist (1921–2005)

James "Jim" A. Dinsmoor (October 4, 1921 – August 25, 2005) was an American experimental psychologist who published work in the field of the experimental analysis of behavior.

== Early life and education ==
Dinsmoor was born October 4, 1921, in Woburn, Massachusetts to Daniel and Jean Dinsmoor. He graduated with his bachelor's degree from Dartmouth College in 1943. Subsequently, he attended Columbia University in New York City, where he received his Master's and Ph.D. degrees under the mentorship of William N. Schoenfeld and Fred S. Keller. He was introduced to the work of B.F. Skinner, whose behavior analytic research inspired Dinsmoor to pursue a lifetime of research in conditioned responding.

== Professional life ==
Throughout his lifetime, Dinsmoor's work expanded upon B.F. Skinner's study of operant conditioning. Skinner's work had a profound effect on James Dinsmoor, who described the work of Skinner as the "bare bone's heart" of psychology. In line with Skinner's work, Dinsmoor's first published study compared the discriminative and reinforcing functions of a stimulus. Reinforcing stimuli are stimuli that are provided that increase the rate of behavior. Discriminative stimuli are defined as stimuli that signal the availability of reinforcement. For example, a mother might ring a dinner bell only when dinner is available, and this leads her children to come inside the house to get the meal. The dinner is the reinforcing stimulus (the children will come inside of the house again when they want food), and the dinner bell is the discriminative stimulus (the children know food is available when the dinner bell rings) (see Stimulus Control). In James Dinsmoor's first work, he compared the rate at which behavior (bar-pressing for food among rats) decreased over time in the presence of a discriminative stimulus without reinforcement, a reinforcing stimulus without the discriminative stimulus, and in the presence of no stimulus. He found that responses decreased over time at a slower rate when a discriminative stimulus was present, even without reinforcement, and concluded that discriminative stimuli act as a filter or a kind of secondary reinforcement.

Dinsmoor's first work was just one of a long list of works on the secondary environmental characteristics that lead to changes in behavior, which he studied throughout his lifetime (see Bibliography). James Dinsmoor first researched these ideas for two years at Columbia University, where he worked as a lecturer before he accepted a job at Indiana University in Bloomington, Indiana in 1951. He worked as a professor at Indiana University for 34 years, where he conducted numerous projects examining basic behavioral processes, especially discrimination learning in the area of negative reinforcement. In general, Dinsmoor's work was influential in the development of scientific knowledge on stimulus control. His work allowed for the formation of a narrative on the differential effects of various types of stimulus control techniques on differing behaviors. James Dinsmoor worked with apparatuses that provided reinforcers (e.g., food) and punishers (e.g., electric shock) to laboratory animals. He knew how to build this equipment himself, and often insisted that his graduate students learn to do the same.

James Dinsmoor was also heavily involved in scholarly communities through his role as an experimental psychologist. He served in a leadership role in a number of psychological institutions, such as the Midwestern Psychological Association (President and Secretary-Treasurer), Division 25 (behavior analysis division) of the American Psychological Association (multiple positions), and the Society for the Experimental Analysis of Behavior (President and Chairman of the Board). Early in his career, he helped organize the creation of the Journal of the Experimental Analysis of Behavior, which is still in circulation today.

== Political involvement ==
In addition to his work as an experimental psychologist, James Dinsmoor was involved politically. In the 1960s, he was involved in activism against the Vietnam War through his university, and he spoke openly at campus rallies and on the radio about his opposition to the war. He was once arrested (but subsequently acquitted) at a war protest in the 1960s. In 1966, he ran for Congress on a platform of opposition to the Vietnam War. Timberlake quoted James Dinsmoor's campaign flyer as stating:

"The time has come for plain speaking. More than two hundred thousand young Americans have been taken from their homes, their jobs, and their families to fight and to die in a distant land. Our rate of casualties is rapidly approaching twenty-five to thirty thousand a year. Our young men are being trained to destroy crops, to burn entire villages, and to kill. In many cases, they cannot distinguish between enemies and friends, between armed guerrillas and innocent civilians."

Dinsmoor did not win the seat at Congress. Instead, he continued his academic work in the field of behaviorism.

== Retirement and death ==
Although he was retired in 1986, James Dinsmoor continued to conduct experiments, publishing as many as 20 articles after his retirement (see Bibliography, below), including one article published the year before his death. He died on August 25, 2005, at the age of 83 at a quiet summer residence in Laconia, New Hampshire and was buried at Pine Grove Cemetery in Gilford, New Hampshire. James Dinsmoor was posthumously awarded the Award for Distinguished Service to Behavior Analysis from the Society for the Advancement of Behavior Analysis in 2006 for his many contributions to the field of the experimental analysis of behavior.

== Bibliography ==
- Dinsmoor, J. A. (1950). A quantitative comparison of the discriminative and reinforcing functions of a stimulus. Journal of Experimental Psychology, 40(4), 458–472. doi:10.1037/h0056266
- Dinsmoor, J. A. (1951). The effect of periodic reinforcement of bar-pressing in the presence of a discriminative stimulus. Journal of Comparative and Physiological Psychology, 44(4), 354–361. doi:10.1037/h0060006
- Dinsmoor, J. A. (1952). The effect of hunger on discriminated responding. The Journal of Abnormal and Social Psychology, 47(1), 67–72. doi:10.1037/h0061273
- Dinsmoor, J. A., & Clayton, M. H. (1963). Chaining and secondary reinforcement based on escape from shock. Journal of the Experimental Analysis of Behavior, 6(1), 75–80. doi:10.1901/jeab.1963.6-75
- Dinsmoor, J. A., & Clayton, M. H. (1966). A conditioned reinforcer maintained by temporal association with the termination of shock. Journal of the Experimental Analysis of Behavior, 9(5), 547–552. doi:10.1901/jeab.1966.9-547
- Dinsmoor, J. A. (1966). Comments on Wetzel's treatment of a case of compulsive stealing. Journal of Consulting Psychology, 30(5), 378–380. doi:10.1037/h0023829
- Dinsmoor, J. A., Bonbright, J. C., & Lilie, D. R. (1971). A controlled comparison of drug effects on escape from conditioned aversive stimulation ('anxiety') and from continuous shock. Psychopharmacologia, 22(4), 323–332. doi:10.1007/BF00406871
- Dinsmoor, J. A., Browne, M. P., & Lawrence, C. E. (1972). A test of the negative discriminative stimulus as a reinforcer of observing. Journal of the Experimental Analysis of Behavior, 18(1), 79–85. doi:10.1901/jeab.1972.18-79
- Dinsmoor, J. A. (1973). Operant conditioning. In: Handbook of general psychology. Oxford England: Prentice Hall.
- Dinsmoor, J. A., & Sears, G. W. (1973). Control of avoidance by a response-produced stimulus. Learning and Motivation, 4(3), 284–293. doi:10.1016/0023-9690(73)90018-0
- Dinsmoor, J. A., Sears, G. W., & Dout, D. L. (1976). Observing as a function of stimulus difference. Journal of Experimental Psychology: Animal Behavior Processes, 2(2), 154–162. doi:10.1037/0097-7403.2.2.154
- Dinsmoor, J. A. (1977). Escape, avoidance, punishment: Where do we stand? Journal of the Experimental Analysis of Behavior, 28(1), 83–95. doi:10.1901/jeab.1977.28-83
- Dinsmoor, J. A., Mulvaney, D. E., & Jwaideh, A. R. (1981). Conditioned reinforcement as a function of duration of stimulus. Journal of the Experimental Analysis of Behavior, 36(1), 41–49. doi:10.1901/jeab.1981.36-41
- Dinsmoor, J. A., Mueller, K. L., Martin, L. T., & Bowe, C. A. (1982). The acquisition of observing. Journal of the Experimental Analysis of Behavior, 38(3), 249–263. doi:10.1901/jeab.1982.38-249
- Dinsmoor, J. (1983). Separating the effects of salience and disparity on the rate of observing. Journal of the Experimental Analysis of Behavior, 40(3), 253–264. doi:10.1901/jeab.1983.40-253
- Dinsmoor, J. A. (1983). Observing and conditioned reinforcement. Behavioral and Brain Sciences, 6(4), 693–728. doi:10.1017/S0140525X00017969
- Dinsmoor, J. A. (1985). The role of observing and attention in establishing stimulus control. Journal of the Experimental Analysis of Behavior, 43(3), 365–381. doi:10.1901/jeab.1985.43-365
- Dinsmoor, J. A. (1986). On preferences for unsignaled shocks and for unpredictable rewards. Behavioral and Brain Sciences, 9(2), 368–370. doi:10.1017/S0140525X00023098
- Dinsmoor, J. A., Lee, D. M., & Brown, M. M. (1986). Escape from serial stimuli leading to food. Journal of the Experimental Analysis of Behavior, 46(3), 259–279. doi:10.1901/jeab.1986.46-259
- Dinsmoor, J. A., Bowe, C. A., Green, L., & Hanson, J. (1988). Information on response requirements compared with information on food density as a reinforcer of observing in pigeons. Journal of the Experimental Analysis of Behavior, 49(2), 229–237. doi:10.1901/jeab.1988.49-229
- Dinsmoor, J. A. (1991). The respective roles of human and nonhuman subjects in behavioral research. The Behavior Analyst, 14(2), 117–121.
- Dinsmoor, J. A., Dougan, J. D., Pfister, J., & Thiels, E. (1992). The autoshaping procedure as a residual block clock. Journal of the Experimental Analysis of Behavior, 58(2), 265–276. doi:10.1901/jeab.1992.58-265
- Dinsmoor, J. A. (1992). Setting the record straight: The social views of B. F. Skinner. American Psychologist, 47(11), 1454–1463. doi:10.1037/0003-066X.47.11.1454
- Dinsmoor, J. A. (1994). A comparison between the block clock and standard autoshaping procedures. Learning and Motivation, 25(3), 313–337. doi:10.1006/lmot.1994.1017
- Dinsmoor, J. A. (1995). In the beginning ... In J. T. Todd, E. K. Morris (Eds.), Modern perspectives on B. F. Skinner and contemporary behaviorism (pp. 25–38). Westport, CT US: Greenwood Press/Greenwood Publishing Group.
- Dinsmoor, J. A. (1995). Stimulus control: I. The Behavior Analyst, 18(1), 51–68.
- Dinsmoor, J. A. (1995). Stimulus control: II. The Behavior Analyst, 18(2), 253–269.
- Dinsmoor, J. A. (1996). Studies in the history of psychology: CVI. An appreciation of Fred S. Keller, 1899–1996. Psychological Reports, 79(3, Pt 1), 891–898. doi:10.2466/pr0.1996.79.3.891
- Dinsmoor, J. A. (1997). The overshadowing of a historical figure: William Nathan Schoenfeld (1915-1996). Revista Mexicana De Análisis De La Conducta, 23(2), 103–110.
- Dinsmoor, J. A. (1997). 'The S-R issue: Its status in behavior analysis and in Donahoe and Palmer's Learning and Complex Behavior': Comment. Journal of the Experimental Analysis of Behavior, 67(2), doi:10.1901/jeab.1997.67-213
- Dinsmoor, J. A. (1997). William Nathan Schoenfeld (1915–1996): Obituary. American Psychologist, 52(12), 1377–1378. doi:10.1037/0003-066X.52.12.1377
- Dinsmoor, J. A. (1998). Punishment. In W. T. O'Donohue (Ed.), Learning and behavior therapy (pp. 188–204). Needham Heights, MA US: Allyn & Bacon.
- Dinsmoor, J. A. (2001). Genetic transmission in evolutionary biology and the three-term contingency in social psychology. Behavior and Social Issues, 11(1), 16–17.
- Dinsmoor, J. A. (2001). Still no evidence for temporally extended shock-frequency reduction as a reinforcer. Journal of the Experimental Analysis of Behavior, 75(3), 367–378. doi:10.1901/jeab.2001.75-367
- Dinsmoor, J. A. (2001). Stimuli inevitably generated by behavior that avoids electric shock are inherently reinforcing. Journal of the Experimental Analysis of Behavior, 75(3), 311–333. doi:10.1901/jeab.2001.75-311
- Dinsmoor, J. A. (2003). Experimental. The Behavior Analyst, 26(1), 151–153.
- Dinsmoor, J. A. (2004). The etymology of basic concepts in the experimental analysis of behavior. Journal of the Experimental Analysis of Behavior, 82(3), 311–316. doi:10.1901/jeab.2004.82-311
