= Fred S. Keller =

American psychologist

Fred Simmons Keller
- Born: January 2, 1899; Near Rural Grove, New York
- Died: February 2, 1996 (aged 97); Chapel Hill, North Carolina
- Education: Tufts, Harvard University
- Known for: Behavior analysis, operant conditioning, personalized instruction
- Awards: James McKeen Cattell Fellow Award (1992)
- Scientific career
- Fields: Psychology
- Workplaces: Colgate, Columbia University; University of Brasília

Fred Simmons Keller (January 2, 1899 – February 2, 1996) was an American psychologist and a pioneer in experimental psychology. He taught at Columbia University for 26 years and gave his name to the Keller Plan, also known as Personalized System of Instruction, an individually paced, mastery-oriented teaching method that has had a significant impact on college-level science education system. He died at home, age 97, on February 2, 1996, in Chapel Hill, North Carolina.

== Life ==
Keller was born on January 2, 1899, on a farm near Rural Grove, New York, in Montgomery County. He was the only child to Vrooming Barney Keller and Minnie Vanderveer Simmons. Due to instability in his childhood, he left school at an early age to pursue employment as a Western Union telegrapher in Saranac Lake, New York. He enlisted in the U.S. Army in 1918 during World War I and served in Camp Jackson, South Carolina, in addition to active duty overseas in France and Germany. While in France, he served in battle five times, and in Germany he participated in the Army of Occupation. Keller exited the military ranking as a sergeant in August 1919.

Keller attended Goddard Seminary, in which he received athletic scholarship in 1919. However, he was accepted to Tufts College in 1920 through a scholarship and decided to attend there. Keller was majoring in English literature. Originally Keller had left school due to discrepancies with his attendance. During his time off of at school, he read John Watson's Psychology from the Standpoint of a Behaviorist, in which he returned to Tufts with a focus in psychology a few years later. He earned a B.S. from Tufts College in 1926 and was awarded an academic position in which he was employed for, for two years. Keller attended Harvard University for graduate school following his bachelor's degree in addition to teaching at Tufts.

Additionally, he took part in a position at Harvard College as a laboratory assistant and a tutor. Keller received his master's degree in 1928 and left Harvard College in 1931. During his time in Harvard, Keller took classes under E.G. Boring, who was the peak of Keller's career. Also, Keller met fellow graduate and famous psychologist, B.F. Skinner, in which they roomed together and became long-life friends. He found a job at Colgate University during the Great Depression and remained there for seven years until 1938. Following Colgate University he was offered a position at Columbia University; he was named assistant professor in 1942, associate professor in 1946, and professor of psychology in 1950. He also served as chairman of the department from 1959 to 1962 and became professor emeritus of psychology in 1964, the same year he retired from the university. In 1963 Keller was invited to Brazil to São Paulo to incorporate his new psychology into their existing academics. Keller returned to the U.S. and was invited back to Brazil, this time to the University of Brazila, where he was instructed to continue the development of his new findings. Upon returning for good, Keller found employment at the Institute for Behavioral Research, as well as Western Michigan University, Texas Christian University, and Georgetown University. Keller spent his time as a visiting professor, adjunct professor, as well as the chair at the listed universities. He retired in May 1976 from Georgetown University.

Keller's students appreciated him as their instructor, as well as appreciated his frequent reinforcers of their behavior. His "theoretical commitment to the power of positive reinforcement... he delivered were never routine" but "mechanical repetitions of 'uhhunh' or 'good'". It was seen as a possible plan to increase academic performance and often singled out his students to denote praise. He was recognized throughout his life and was liked by many. After his death, a memorial was held in San Francisco by the Association for Behavior Analysis, in which over two hundred people took part in. Keller was also recognized for his "effects of his lectures on one student's behavior ... efficacy of his teaching" and "graceful flow of sentence into paragraph".

== Contributions to psychology ==
Inspired by B. F. Skinner, Keller proposed a reinforcement theory that applies to his teaching in addition to research. He and William N. Schoenfeld produced a textbook as well as an introductory laboratory course in psychology that related animal psychology with white rats as their subjects. The textbook was called "Principles of Psychology," published in 1950. The book emphasized scientific methods in the study of psychology such as escape, avoidance, conflict, cooperation, imitation, verbal behavior, thinking, and concept formation. In addition to providing a course that initiated the first use of experimental analysis of behavior during his time at Columbia University, Keller and Schoenfeld provided a more concise understanding for concepts that Skinner proposed in his The Behavior of Organisms. Concepts were written in a clearer way for students to understand and was more appropriate for an undergraduate beginners course. In the lab, students were able to test the methods they were learning of in their lecture classes for the first time. Among their experiments, the students observed the responses of white rats to stimuli and rewards and measured human learning by testing people's ability to remember the pathways of mazes and other sensory processes.

Keller and Skinner interacted frequently, and even collectively held the 1947 conference on the Experimental Analysis of Behavior. The audience consisted of students from both colleges of Skinner and Keller and the precursors to their new movement. With the aid of students, Skinner and Keller were able to formulate, at the conferences held up until 1950, the Journal of the Experimental Analysis of Behavior, the Journal of Applied Behavior Analysis, Division 25 of the APA, the Association for Behavior Analysis, The Behavior Analyst, Analysis of Verbal Behavior, the Cambridge Center for Behavioral Studies, Behavior and Social Issues, and Behavior and Philosophy.

Keller subsequently studied learning in addition to behavior. He was the first to administer Skinner's previous findings into real-world applications by the process of transcribing auditory signals of Morse code into English. The method he used was called code-voice, which resembled Skinner's programmed instruction, which was fancied by the US Army. Code-voice was used mostly in the Signal Corps, although it was also used in other divisions, and became one of the most used methods in radio-operator training. The new method "represented an early application of the laws of learning to practical human affairs and served as a model for the study of several other skills" and was awarded by President Truman a certificate of Merit in 1948.

He was a fellow of the American Psychological Association and a past president of the Eastern Psychological Association. He received the Distinguished Teaching Award from the American Psychological Foundation in 1970.

== Brazil ==
Concluding his years at Columbia University, he was invited to the University of São Paulo by Fulbright–Hays, in which he attended as a visiting professor. He spent one year in Brazil during 1961, establishing his reinforcement theory into the psychological presence. Keller constructed multiple experimental instruments used to test reinforcement, such as living cages that were constructed from ordinary resources. He used hard-wire cloths, wooden frames, bent wire that acted as levers, pencils, watches, and cocktail stirrers. Keller initiated a new psychology in the city of Brazil and was recognized heavily for it. His influence at the university initiated multiple students to travel to the US to continue the work of Keller.

Several years after returning from Brazil he got an invitation to come back in 1963. He was asked to create a novel department, designed completely by him (carta branca), called "personalized system of instruction". He spent his time at the University of Brasília developing his new psychological program, in which he was forced to depart from in 1964. He continued his work in the US on the PSI, also known as the Keller Plan, with several other theorists, and his work continued in Brazil by his students. His work was also translated into Portuguese.

== Personalized System of Instruction (PSI) ==
Keller's paper "Good-bye, teacher..." issued in Journal of Applied Behavior Analysis in 1968 introduced the concept of Personalized System of Instruction (PSI). This lead later to "Mastery learning" plan.

When Keller returned to the US, he continued the work he had started in Brazil dealing with the personalized system of instruction. His work was developed in collaboration with J. G. Sherman at Arizona State University, where he remained for three years. During his time, J. G. Sherman and Keller advanced principles associated with the PSI. These included "(1) The semester's work was divided into, let's say, twenty units, in a logical progression such as the necessary background for each unit, was contained in the units that went before. (2) Repeated tests were given, administered by student "proctors" selected from those who had been most successful during the previous semester, and each student would continue testing on a given unit of the material until he had demonstrated satisfactory proficiency. Erroneous answers could be discussed, or even debated with the student proctor until a clear understanding was achieved. (3) The criterion for moving on to the next unit was not a particular understanding, but 'mastery' of a given unit of material. Eventually, all students, if they persisted, were expected to turn in a performance. (4) Each student worked at his own pace".

Students were encouraged to master each concept before moving on to a subsequent concept. This allowed each student to work at their own pace without fear of falling behind.

Following Arizona State, Keller attended in 1967 the Institute for Behavioral Research located in Silver Spring, Maryland. During his attendance, he developed several additional concepts in regards to the PSI and published a well-known paper called "Good-bye Teacher...." where the concept of PSI was first presented. In 1970 he had received the Distinguished Teacher Award given to him by the APA, as well as the honorary Doctor of Science degree from Long Island University in addition to Colgate University in 1976. Additionally, he was given the Behavioral Scientist medal in 1973 from the Institute for Behavioral Research and the Doctor of Humane Letters degree in 1976.

== See also ==
- Behavioral activation
