= Ovide F. Pomerleau =

American psychologist (born 1940)

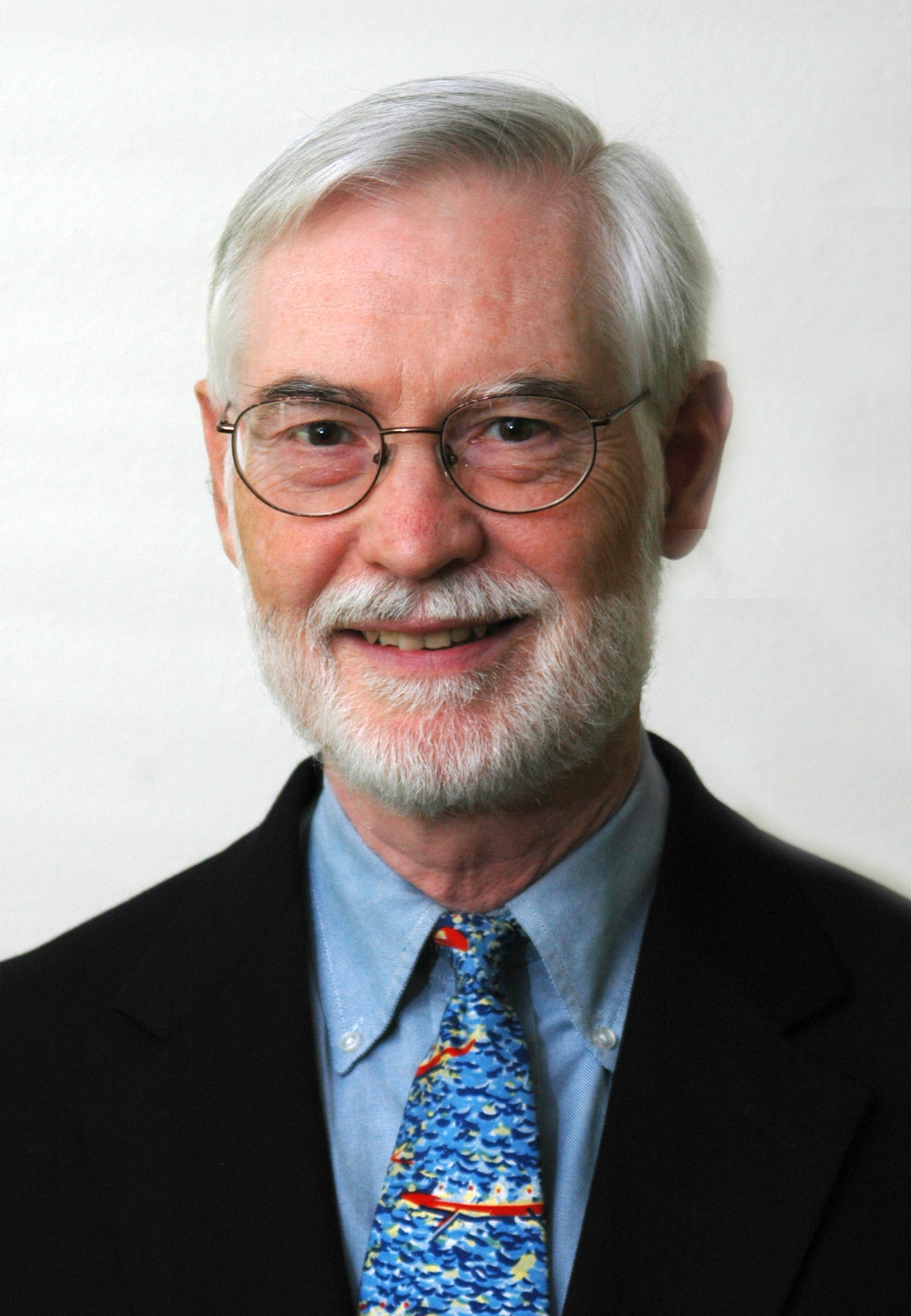
Ovide F. Pomerleau

Ovide F. Pomerleau (born June 4, 1940) is an American psychologist who pioneered the development of behavioral medicine. He is best known for his work on self-management problems and addiction, focusing on the behavioral, biological, and genetic bases of tobacco smoking and nicotine dependence. He was the founding president of the Society for Research on Nicotine and Tobacco.

== Early life and education ==
Pomerleau was born and grew up in Waterville, Maine, the son of Ovid Pomerleau, a physician and general surgeon, and Florence Beaudet Pomerleau. He earned a B.A. (1962) in philosophy from Bowdoin College, followed by a M.S. (1965) in general psychology and Ph.D. (1969) in experimental psychology from Columbia University, where he trained in the laboratory of William N. Schoenfeld. In 1971 he completed postdoctoral training in clinical psychology at Temple University, where he worked with Philip H. Bobrove and Louis C. Harris.

== Career ==
Pomerleau held a faculty appointment in the Temple University Department of Psychiatry from 1969 to 1972. During this time, he and his colleagues designed and tested a token economy at Philadelphia State Hospital at Byberry that extended earlier work on token economies in psychiatric settings by addressing the behavior not only of seriously mentally ill patients but also of paraprofessional staff.

From 1972 to 1979, Pomerleau served on the faculty of the University of Pennsylvania Department of Psychiatry, where he and John Paul Brady founded the Center for Behavioral Medicine in 1973 to develop interventions for weight management and the treatment of smoking and problem drinking, chronic behaviors associated with diminished quality of life, decreased longevity, and pathophysiology. The Center for Behavioral Medicine focused on the application of behavior modification to medical care, an approach subsequently expanded to encompass the integration of biological, behavioral, psychological, and social sciences for understanding illness and health.

In 1979, Pomerleau joined the faculty of the University of Connecticut Department of Psychiatry, where he collaborated with L. Everett Seyler to demonstrate and quantitate, at the human level, the release of beta-endorphin and other hypophyseal hormones in response to nicotine administration. Because of the role of endogenous opioids in promoting feelings of well-being and euphoria, these findings came under attack by the tobacco industry, which at the time maintained that tobacco was not addictive.

From 1985 until his retirement in 2009, Pomerleau served on the faculty of the University of Michigan Department of Psychiatry and ran the University of Michigan Nicotine Research Laboratory, which conducted research on the subjective, physiological, and biochemical effects of smoking, and on the effects of pharmacological probes and laboratory stressors on measures of nicotine intake and withdrawal. He developed a "sensitivity model" of nicotine addiction based on animal and human research, subsequently supported by observations that pleasurable or euphoric responses to nicotine during early smoking experimentation predict later addiction.

He also conducted research on the relationship of smoking and psychiatric disorders, and his team was the first to document and describe the link between smoking and Adult Attention Deficit Disorder. He was an early proponent of the need for measured genetic research on smoking and nicotine addiction.

== Personal life ==
In 1965, Pomerleau married Cynthia Stodola Pomerleau, subsequently his collaborator at the University of Michigan. The couple has two daughters.

== Honors and awards ==
- Sigma Xi: The Scientific Research Society (1969)
- Fellow, American Psychological Association:
  - Division 25 (Experimental Analysis of Behavior)
  - Division 28 (Psychopharmacology and Substance Abuse)
  - Division 38 (Health Psychology)
  - Division 50 (Addictions)
- Fellow, American Psychological Society
- Fellow, Academy of Behavioral Medicine Research
- Fellow, Society of Behavioral Medicine
- Founding President, Society for Research on Nicotine and Tobacco (1994–95)
- Ove Ferno Award, Society for Research on Nicotine and Tobacco (2004)
- President's Award, Society for Research on Nicotine and Tobacco (2016)

== Selected publications ==
- “Rewarding psychiatric aides for the improvement of assigned patients.” Pomerleau OF, Bobrove PH, and Smith RH. Journal of Applied Behavior Analysis 6:383-390 (1973); reprinted in ‘’Psychotherapy and Behavior Change Annual’’, H Strupp (Ed.). Chicago: Aldine Publishing Company.
- “The role of behavior modification in preventive medicine.“ Pomerleau OF, Bass F, and Crown V. The New England Journal of Medicine 292(24):1277-1282 (1975).
- Break the Smoking Habit: A Behavioral Program for Giving Up Cigarettes. Pomerleau OF and Pomerleau CS (1977). Research Press Co. ISBN 978-0878221363
- Behavioral Medicine: Theory and Practice. Pomerleau OF and Brady JP (Eds.)(1979). Baltimore: Williams, Wilkins. ISBN 978-0683069570
- “Behavioral medicine: The contribution of the experimental analysis of behavior to medical care.“ Pomerleau OF. American Psychologist 34:654-663. (1979).
- “Neuroendocrine reactivity to nicotine in smokers.” Pomerleau OF, Fertig JB, Seyler LE, and Jaffe J. Psychopharmacology (journal) 81:61-67 (1983).
- “Neuroregulators and the reinforcement of smoking: Towards a biobehavioral explanation.” Pomerleau OF and Pomerleau CS. Neuroscience & Biobehavioral Reviews 8:503-513 (1984).
- “Individual differences in sensitivity to nicotine: Implications for genetic research on nicotine dependence.” Pomerleau OF. Behavior Genetics (journal) 25:161-177 (1995).
- “Cigarette smoking in adult patients diagnosed with Attention Deficit Hyperactivity Disorder.” Pomerleau OF, Downey KK, Stelson FW, and Pomerleau CS. ‘’Journal of Substance Abuse’’ 7:373-378 (1995).
- “Early experiences with nicotine among women smokers, ex-smokers, and never-smokers.” Pomerleau OF, Pomerleau CS, and Namenek RJ. Addiction (journal) 93:595-599 (1998).
- “Initial exposure to nicotine in college-age women smokers and never-smokers: A replication and extension.” Pomerleau CS, Pomerleau OF, Namenek RJ, and Marks JL. ‘’Journal of Addictive Diseases’’ 8:13-19 (1999).
- "Genetic research on complex behaviors: An examination of attempts to identify genes for smoking." Pomerleau OF, Burmeister M, Madden P, Long J, Swan GE, and Kardia SLR. Nicotine & Tobacco Research 9:883-901 (2007).
- "Variants in the nicotinic receptors alter the risk for nicotine dependence." Bierut LJ, Stitzel JA, Wang JC, Hinrichs AL, Bertelsen S, Fox L, Grucza RA, Horton WJ, Kauwe JS, Morgan SD, Saccone NL, Saccone SF, Suei X, Breslau N, Budde J, Chase GA, Cloninger CR, Dick DM, Foroud T, Hatsukami D, Hesselbrock V, Johnson EO, Kramer J, Kuperman S, Madden PAF, Mayo K, Maxwell T, Nurnberger J, Pomerleau OF, Porjesz B, Reyes O, Schuckit M, Swan G, Tischfield JA, Edenberg HJ, Rice JP, Goate AM. American Journal of Psychiatry 165:1163-1171 (2008).
