= William N. Schoenfeld =

American psychologist (1915–1996)

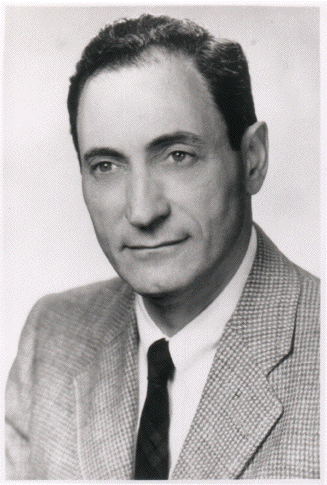
- Born: December 6, 1915 near New York City, U.S.
- Died: August 6, 1996; Sun City West, Arizona, U.S.
- Education: Columbia University
- Known for: Behavior analysis, operant conditioning
- Scientific career
- Fields: Psychology
- Workplaces: Columbia University; Queens College, CUNY; Hebrew University

William N. Schoenfeld (December 6, 1915 – August 3, 1996) was an American psychologist and author.

Born in New York City, he conducted original research in experimental psychology, and advocated behaviorism, which seeks to understand behavior as a function of environmental histories of experiencing consequences. Dr. Schoenfeld's own original contributions in a long research career were influenced by those of B.F. Skinner and Ivan Pavlov. In a carefully devised set of experiments in 1953 he led a team of Columbia University psychologists in discovering that anxiety caused the human heart rate to slow rather than quicken under certain timing of stimuli.

He was the co-author with Fred S. Keller, a Columbia colleague, of Principles of Psychology, an influential college text published in 1950 that emphasized scientific methods in the study of psychology. Students first used it in courses at Columbia College, where the two professors offered two hours of lecture and, for the first time in psychology, four hours of laboratory work a week. Among their experiments, the students observed the responses of white rats to stimuli and rewards and measured human learning by testing people's ability to remember the pathways of mazes and other sensory processes. Together with Keller, they pioneered the first introductory psychology course to provide a laboratory animal model for behavior, which led to so many more like his (Hearst, E., 1997).

William Nathan Schoenfeld graduated from the College of the City of New York in 1937 and earned an MA in 1939 and a Ph.D. at Columbia in 1942. Although he was a Chemistry major as an undergraduate, he took courses in physics, biology, mathematics, and geology. With the help of the various courses, Schoenfeld was able to build a solid foundation for his approach to analyzing behavior using the scientific method. In 1937, Schoenfeld was the only student to graduate with a psychology degree and receive a Bachelor of Science degree.

Schoenfeld became a lecturer in psychology at Columbia in 1942, an instructor in 1946, associate professor in 1952 and a full professor in 1958. He joined the faculty of Queens College of the City University of New York in 1966, to become the chairman of the psychology department and was named a professor emeritus in 1983. Later he taught in the psychology department of the Hebrew University in Jerusalem and at universities in Mexico, Venezuela and Brazil. He was awarded an honorary degree by the University of Guadalajara in Mexico.

Throughout his career, he wrote or contributed to over 100 publications of learning theory such as: The Theory of Reinforcement Schedules (1970), Stimulus Schedules (1972) and Religion and Human Behavior (1993). Schoenfeld also published an article in 1941 called Psychological Review while he was an undergraduate at Columbia University. After publishing the Psychological Review, Schoenfeld was acknowledged as one of the most distinguished theorists of psychology.

He was president of the division of the analysis of behavior of the American Psychological Association and president of the Eastern Psychological Association (1972–1973) and the Pavlovian Society of North America. He was an editor of the Journal of Comparative and Physiological Psychology and Conditional Reflex. He was also one of the major contributors to the founding of the Journal of the Experimental Analysis of Behavior.

== Students ==
William N. Schoenfeld was a prolific doctoral advisor, who is said to have ultimately valued his teaching more than his research. Indeed, many of his students continued into prominence in their own right. They include:

P. J. Bersh, A. Charles Catania, W. W. Cumming, James A. Dinsmoor, Charles Ferster, Peter Harzem, Eliot S. Hearst, Francis Mechner, John Anthony Nevin, Ovide F. Pomerleau, Emilio Ribes, Murray Sidman, Carlos Bruner.
