= Linda J. Hayes =

American psychologist and behavior theorist

- Born: Linda J. Parrott
- Occupation: American psychologist
- Spouse: Steven C. Hayes (divorced)

Academic background
- Education: Western Michigan University

Academic work
- Discipline: Behavior theory and philosophy
- Institutions: University of Nevada, Reno

Linda J. Hayes (née Parrott) is a Canadian-born psychologist and distinguished international professor at the University of Nevada, Reno. She has contributed to the study and understanding of interbehaviorism and behavior theory and philosophy. Hayes has been honored for her contributions to behavior analytic research, teaching, and international development.

== Early life and education ==
Hayes earned her doctorate in psychology at Western Michigan University after receiving a bachelor’s degree from University of Manitoba. She was a faculty member at West Virginia University and Saint Mary’s University before co-founding the behavior analysis program at University of Nevada Reno.

== Research and career ==
Influenced by the work of J. R. Kantor, Hayes has translated Kantor’s philosophy of science and ideas for behavior analysts. Her research primarily focused on the behavior theory and philosophy areas of interbehaviorism and verbal behavior.

Hayes spent 32 years at the University of Nevada, Reno. The UNR behavior analysis program began as a self-capitalization model where faculty and students generated revenue to fund the program at almost no cost to the university. Hayes founded and directed UNR's satellite program, which brought behavior analysis training to parts of the US, Canada, Jordan, Taiwan, Saudi Arabia, China, and Kenya. She has received several international development and global engagement awards for her work with the satellite program. During her career at UNR, Hayes mentored 33 doctoral students.

Hayes served as president of the Association for Behavior Analysis International twice and held multiple terms on the executive council. On her retirement in 2022, Hayes was recognized with the distinguished faculty award from the University of Nevada, Reno.

== Awards and honors ==
- Fellow, Association for Behavior Analysis International
- Fred S. Keller Award for Training of Behavior Analysis, American Psychological Association Division 25
- Outstanding Teacher Award, College of Arts and Sciences at West Virginia University
- Outstanding Faculty Award, Board of Regents of the Nevada System of Colleges and Universities
- Outstanding Alumna Award, Western Michigan University
- Distinguished Service to Behavior Analysis, Society for the Advancement of Behavior Analysis
- International Development Award, Latin Association for Behavior Analysis and Modification
- Global Engagement Award, University of Nevada, Reno

== Select publications ==
- Hayes, L. J. (2017). J. R. Kantor's contributions to psychology and philosophy: A guide to further study. The Behavior Analyst, 7, 169–181. https://doi.org/10.1007/BF03391900 PMID 22478609
- Hayes, L. J. (1998). Remembering as a psychological event. Journal of Theoretical and Philosophical Psychology, 18(2), 135–143. https://doi.org/10.1037/h0091180
- Hayes, L. J., & Fryling, M. J. (2023). Interbehaviorism: A comprehensive guide to the foundations of Kantor’s theory and its applications for modern behavior analysis. Context Press.
