= Dinsmoor =

Dinsmoor is a surname, and may refer to:

- Charles Dinsmoor (1834–1904), American inventor and lawyer
- James A Dinsmoor (1921-2005), a psychologist specialized in the field of experiential analysis of behavior
- Samuel Dinsmoor (1766–1835), American teacher, lawyer and politician
- Samuel Dinsmoor Jr. (1799–1869), American lawyer, banker and politician
- Samuel P. Dinsmoor (1843–1932), American teacher and sculptor
- Silas Dinsmoor (1766–1847), U. S. Agent to the Cherokee and Choctaw
- William Bell Dinsmoor (1886–1973), American architectural historian of classical Greece
- William Bell Dinsmoor Jr. (1923–1988), American classical archaeologist and architectural historian
