= Murray Sidman =

American behavioral scientist (1923–2019)

- Born: April 29, 1923
- Died: May 18, 2019 (aged 96)
- Education: Columbia University
- Known for: Behavior analysis, Avoidance, Stimulus Equivalence
- Scientific career
- Fields: Psychology
- Workplaces: Columbia University; Harvard Medical School; University of Nevada; Northeastern University; Johns Hopkins University
- Doctoral advisor: William N. Schoenfeld

Murray Sidman (April 29, 1923 – May 18, 2019) was an American behavioral scientist, best known for Sidman Avoidance, also called "free-operant avoidance", in which an organism learns to avoid an aversive stimulus by engaging in a targeted response in the absence of stimuli indicating whether the aversive stimulus is forthcoming. Sidman's explanation of free-operant avoidance is an alternative to the Miller-Mowrer two-process theory of avoidance.

== Methodology ==
Methodologically, a "Sidman avoidance procedure" is an experiment in which the subject is periodically presented with an aversive stimulus, such as the introduction of carbon dioxide or an electric shock, unless they engage in a particular response, such as pulling a plunger, which delays the stimulus by a certain amount of time.

His work on methodology for behavioral psychologists is the standard textbook in its field.

== Career ==
Sidman took his PhD at Columbia in psychology from Columbia University 1952 under the advisership of William N. Schoenfeld. He worked at many research institutions, including Harvard Medical School, Johns Hopkins University Medical School, and the Walter Reed Army Institute of Research. He served as director of the Behavioral Sciences Department at the E.K. Shriver Center for Mental Retardation and Developmental Disabilities. Murray Sidman made significant contributions to the field of behavioral pharmacology through his groundbreaking research on the behavioral effects of drugs. His work focused on understanding how drugs can influence behavior and the underlying mechanisms involved. Sidman's research helped shed light on the behavioral principles that govern drug effects and addiction. Until his death in 2019, he was professor emeritus at Northeastern University. Dr. Sidman has held academic appointments at the University of São Paulo in Brasil, Keio University in Tokyo, Japan and the University of Canterbury in Christchurch, New Zealand.

== Influence in the field ==
Sidman pioneered research on stimulus equivalence, and made important contributions to the discipline of applied behavior analysis. He published three highly impactful books in the areas of applied behavior analysis and the experimental analysis of behavior.

Tactics of Scientific Research

"Tactics of Scientific Research" (1960)-Sidman's early work, focused on the methodology of scientific inquiry. This text explores the principles and practices of conducting rigorous scientific research and has been influential in shaping research approaches in various disciplines.

Coercion and Its Fallout

"Coercion and Its Fallout" (1989)-Perhaps Sidman's best-known book among scientists and thinkers outside of behavior analysis. In it, he examines the unintended consequences of using coercive tactics in attempts to control behavior. Sidman argues for a more humane and effective approach to behavior change, emphasizing positive reinforcement over punishment.

Equivalence Relations and Behavior: A Research Story

"Equivalence Relations and Behavior: A Research Story" (1994)-This book delves into Sidman's research on stimulus equivalence, a concept in behavior analysis that explores the emergence of complex behavioral relations between stimuli. "Equivalence Relations and Behavior" is a seminal work in this area, contributing to a deeper understanding of how individuals learn and generalize concepts.

Murray Sidman's work has had a lasting impact on the field of behavior analysis. His emphasis on empirical research, ethical considerations, and a scientific approach to understanding behavior has influenced generations of psychologists and behavior analysts.

Murray Sidman's books and research have left an indelible mark on the field of behavior analysis. His work continues to shape the way psychologists and behavior analysts approach the study of behavior and the development of interventions for individuals with diverse needs.

Dr. Sidman’s publications in peer-refereed journals number close to 100 and have defined much of our current understanding of stimulus control, stimulus equivalence, and avoidance behavior. His 1960 text, Tactics of Scientific Research, is considered the first primer on within- subject research methodology. It is a classic that is still used today. Other contributions have extended to important social problems. The second edition of his book Coercion and Its Fallout was published in 2000, and his treatment of “Terrorism as Behavior” was published in Behavior and Social Issues.

== Sidman Avoidance Theory ==
=== Overview ===
Developed by Murray Sidman in 1953, the Sidman Avoidance Theory is a fundamental concept in behavioral psychology. This theory provides insight into how organisms, including humans, learn to avoid negative consequences through specific behaviors. It represents a significant shift from traditional theories of behavior modification and learning processes.

=== Theoretical Framework ===
At its core, Sidman's theory contrasts with the classical 'escape' behavior paradigm. Traditional models focus on how organisms learn to avoid an ongoing negative stimulus. In contrast, Sidman Avoidance examines the learning process whereby an organism preemptively engages in behavior to avoid the negative stimulus altogether. This unique aspect of the theory emphasizes the proactive nature of learning in avoidance behaviors. Sidman's work emphasized the principles governing the acquisition and maintenance of avoidance behavior. He explored how organisms, both human and non-human, learn to perform specific behaviors to prevent or avoid aversive consequences. Murray Sidman's studies on avoidance conditioning significantly contributed to the understanding of the principles governing the acquisition and maintenance of avoidance behavior. His work laid the groundwork for further research in behavioral psychology and had practical implications for therapeutic approaches.

=== Experimental Foundations ===
The experimental foundations of Murray Sidman's Sidman Avoidance Theory are centered around a distinctive approach in behavioral psychology. This approach, known as the "Sidman avoidance procedure," involves experiments where the subject is exposed to an aversive stimulus, such as an electric shock or the introduction of carbon dioxide, at regular intervals. The subject can avoid this stimulus by performing a specific response, such as pulling a plunger or jumping over a barrier. Each successful avoidance response delays the presentation of the aversive stimulus by resetting the timer to zero. This method is also referred to as free operant avoidance conditioning.

These experiments were pivotal in demonstrating the learning process in the absence of a warning signal before the aversive stimulus. This aspect was a significant departure from previous avoidance conditioning models, which typically included a warning signal. Sidman's research showed that subjects could learn to avoid an unpleasant stimulus through a specific behavior, even without any external cues signaling the imminent presentation of the stimulus.

=== Significance and Applications ===
Sidman's theory has had a profound impact on the field of psychology, particularly in understanding the mechanisms behind avoidance behavior. Its implications extend beyond basic psychology, influencing clinical approaches to treating phobias and anxiety disorders. The theory has been instrumental in developing behavioral therapies that target avoidance behaviors, providing a more nuanced understanding of how such behaviors develop and are sustained.

=== Research Context ===
The development of the Sidman Avoidance Theory took place over several years and was influenced by Sidman's work at various institutions, including Harvard Medical School and Johns Hopkins University Medical School. His academic journey and professional appointments greatly contributed to the richness and depth of his research.

== Stimulus Equivalence Theory ==
Murray Sidman had a significant influence on research examining stimulus equivalence—a topic that has now garnered decades of empirical examination.

This theory rooted in the study of how organisms come to form relationships between different stimuli due to the organism's history of conditioning and interaction with their environment. To call a relationship an equivalence relation, there are three features that must be demonstrated:

=== Reflexivity ===
Reflexivity is a relationship between a stimulus and itself. Reflexivity is shown when an organism is trained A is equal to A, and subsequently emits responding indicating that A is equal to A.

=== Symmetry ===
Symmetry is a relationship between two different stimuli that operates in both directions. The organism may be taught that A is equal to B. Symmetry is shown if the organism emits behavior indicating that B is equal to A.

==== Transitivity ====
Transitivity describes a relationship between two differing stimuli. An organism is taught A is equal to B, and B is equal to C. If the organism can then demonstrate that A is equal to C (an untrained relation), a transitive relation has been identified.

== See also ==
- Experimental analysis of behavior
- Behavior analysis of child development
