= Florence DiGennaro Reed =

American behavior analyst

Florence DiGennaro Reed is a licensed behavior analyst and researcher who studies how to improve the quality of health and human services using organizational behavior management. She was a professor in and chairperson of the Department of Applied Behavioral Science at the University of Kansas until becoming the Chief Operating Officer of the Behavior Analyst Certification Board.

== Career ==
DiGennaro Reed completed her BA in psychology at Binghamton University, an MA in experimental psychology at Long Island University - CW Post Campus, and a PhD in school psychology at Syracuse University. She completed her clinical post-doctoral fellowship at the Institute for Child Development and a pre-doctoral internship in clinical psychology at the May Center for Education and Neurorehabilitation and the May Center for Child Development. She has authored over 100 articles and book chapters, edited two books, and co-authored a textbook on various behavior analytic topics including performance management, assessment, and intervention.

At KU, her lab, called Performance Management Laboratory, studied methods of staff training and performance improvement and conducted translational research.

She has served on the editorial boards of Journal of Applied Behavior Analysis, Journal of Organizational Behavior Management, Behavior Analysis Research and Practice, Journal of Behavioral Education, Behavior Analysis in Practice, The Psychological Record, and School Psychology Review and has served as an Associate Editor for Journal of Applied Behavior Analysis, Journal of Organizational Behavior Management, Journal of Behavioral Education, and Behavior Analysis in Practice.

== Awards and honors ==
- OBM Network: Outstanding Contribution Award (2023)
- Association for Behavior Analysis International Outstanding Mentor Award (2021, 2012)
- Louise Byrd Graduate Educator Award (2021)
- J. Michael Young Academic Advisor Award (2014)

== Selected works ==
- Blackman, A. L., Ruby, S. A., Bartle, G., DiGennaro Reed, F. D., Strouse, M., Erath, T. G., & Leon-Barajas, M. (2022). Effects of a systems level intervention to improve trainer integrity. Advances in Neurodevelopmental Disabilities, 6, 304-314. * Madden, G.J., Reed, D.D., & DiGennaro Reed, F.D. (2021). Introduction to behavior analysis. New Jersey: Wiley.
- Erath, T. G., DiGennaro Reed, F. D., Sundermeyer, H. W., Brand, D., Novak, M. D., Harbison, M. J., & Shears, R. (2020). Enhancing the training integrity of human service staff using pyramidal behavioral skills training. Journal of Applied Behavior Analysis, 53, 449–464.
- DiGennaro Reed, F. D., Blackman, A. L., Erath, T. G., Brand, D., & Novak, M. D. (2018). Guidelines for using behavioral skills training to provide teacher support. Teaching Exceptional Children, 50(6), 373–380.
