= Nature Climate Change =

- Discipline: Atmospheric sciences, environmental sciences
- Language: English
- Edited by: Bronwyn Wake

Publication details
- Former name(s): Nature Reports Climate Change
- History: April 2011–present
- Publisher: Nature Portfolio
- Frequency: Monthly
- Impact factor: 30.3 (2023)

Standard abbreviations
- ISO 4: Nat. Clim. Change

Indexing
- CODEN: NCCACZ
- ISSN: 1758-678X (print); 1758-6798 (web)
- LCCN: 2011207815
- OCLC no.: 696271299

Links
- Journal homepage; Online access; Online archive

Nature Climate Change is a monthly peer-reviewed scientific journal published by Nature Portfolio covering all aspects of research on global warming, the current climate change, especially its effects. It was established in 2011 as the continuation of Nature Reports Climate Change, itself established in 2007. Its first editor-in-chief was Olive Heffernan and the journal's current editor-in-chief is Bronwyn Wake. According to the Journal Citation Reports, the journal had a 2023 impact factor of 30.3.
