= Bronwen =

- Gender: Feminine

Origin
- Origin: Welsh bron "breast" + -wen, soft mutation of gwen "fair""white"

Other names
- Related names: Branwen (associated by sound), Bronwyn (variant spelling – technically masculine)

Bronwen (Welsh pronunciation: [ˈbrɔnwɛn]) is a Welsh feminine given name. It is closely associated with the similar name Branwen, which appears in medieval Welsh literature. Used in Wales since the 19th century, it was introduced to the English-speaking public at large by a character in the Richard Llewellyn novel How Green Was My Valley (novel) (1939).

Notable bearers of the name include:

- Bronwen Astor (1930–2017), English model
- Dame Bronwen Holdsworth (born 1943), New Zealand businesswoman and arts patron
- Bronwen Dickey (born 1981), American author
- Bronwen Hughes, Canadian film director
- Bronwen Knox, Australian water polo centre back/centre forward
- Bronwen Maher (born 1957), Irish politician
- Bronwen Manby, British human rights scholar and lobbyist
- Bronwen Mantel (born 1950), Canadian actress
- Bronwen Saunders (born 1978), Canadian curler
- Bronwen Wallace (1945–1989), Canadian poet and short story writer

== See also ==
- Branwen
- Bronwyn
