= Eliot S. Hearst =

American psychologist (1932–2018)

- Born: July 7, 1932; New York City, New York
- Died: January 20, 2018 (aged 85); Tucson, Arizona
- Education: Columbia University
- Awards: Guggenheim Fellowship (1974)
- Scientific career
- Workplaces: National Institute of Mental Health; University of Missouri; Indiana University
- Doctoral advisor: William N. Schoenfeld

Eliot S. Hearst (July 7, 1932 – January 20, 2018) was an American psychologist and professional chess player known for his writings on blindfold chess.

== Biography ==
Hearst was born in New York City on July 7, 1932, and earned his B.A. in psychology summa cum laude from Columbia University in 1953 and his doctorate in 1956 under William N. Schoenfeld. After graduating from Columbia, Hearst was stationed at Walter Reed Army Medical Center and worked in the departments of experimental psychology and neurophysiology for two years.

From 1958 to 1964, Hearst was a senior experimental psychologist with the National Institute of Mental Health and St. Elizabeths Hospital. He then took a fellowship at the Royal College of Surgeons of England and worked under John Vane.

Hearst entered academia in 1965, joining the faculty of the University of Missouri as a professor of psychology and moved to Indiana University in 1967, teaching courses on animal behavior, learning theory, and history of psychology. He was also contracted by the Psychonomic Society to edit a volume on the historical assessments of the major subfields of psychology, The First Century of Experimental Psychology (1979). He was made Distinguished Professor by Indiana University in 1984 and retired in 1996. He then became an adjunct professor of psychology at Columbia University and the University of Arizona, where his sister, Marlys Witte, was on the faculty.

Hearst received a Guggenheim Fellowship in 1974. He was elected to the Society of Experimental Psychologists in 1981 and served on the governing board of the Psychonomic Society.

== Personal life ==
Hearst was an avid chess player who won New York State Championship in 1950 and competed in the national championship in 1954 and 1961. He was a member of the U.S. Chess team at the World Student Team Championship held in the Soviet Union in 1960, when the U.S. team won first place ahead of the Soviet team led by Boris Spassky. In 1962, he served as the captain of the U.S. Olympic Chess Team. He also defeated Bobby Fischer and played John Vane blindfolded. He earned the titles Senior Master and Life Master from the United States Chess Federation, and has written about Blindfold Chess. He was also a columnist on Chess Life, with his own column called "Chess Kaleidoscope."

Hearst died on January 20, 2018, in Tucson, Arizona. The Eliot S. Hearst Memorial Lectureship at Indiana University was named in his honor.
