= Bronwyn Nielsen =

South African broadcaster and media executive (born 1972)

- Born: 1972 (age 53–54); KwaZulu-Natal, South Africa
- Education: University of Cape Town; Harvard Business School
- Occupations: Media executive; Event moderator
- Years active: 2007– present
- Employer: CNBC Africa (2007–2017)
- Notable work: Editor-in-Chief at CNBC Africa; Executive Director at ABN Group

Bronwyn Nielsen (born 1972), is a South African broadcaster and media executive. Since 2018, she has been the founder and CEO of The Nielsen Network, a Johannesburg-based communications consultancy. She previously worked at CNBC Africa from 2007 to 2017, serving as Editor-in-Chief from 2012 and as Executive Director of its parent company, Africa Business News (ABN Group) from 2014. Since 2011, she has served as a moderator of debates and panel discussions at meetings of the World Economic Forum and other international forums. She began her broadcasting career in 1997 with Summit Television and later worked as a news anchor at e.tv. In 2007, she received the Telkom ICT Journalist of the Year award.

== Biography ==
Bronwyn Nielsen was born in 1972 and grew up in KwaZulu-Natal, South Africa. She completed her undergraduate studies at the University of Cape Town, graduating with a Bachelor of Commerce degree in 1992. She later completed executive education programmes at Harvard Business School in 2016.

== Media career ==
Nielsen began her broadcasting career in 1997 with Summit Television on DStv, presenting business news focused on South African markets. In the early 2000s, she joined E.tv as a news anchor, succeeding Jane Dutton. Additionally, in 2003, she had a TV programme on the Summit TV named Weekend Property. She later delivered a daily African business news segment on Sky News.

=== ABN Group ===
In 2007, she joined CNBC Africa as a business news anchor and presenter, covering economic, political, and corporate developments on the African continent. In 2012, she was appointed Editor-in-Chief of CNBC Africa. Since 2013, she hosted and moderated CNBC Africa debates and panel discussions at World Economic Forum meetings. The senior leaders she hosted include Paul Kagame, Jacob Zuma, Sunil Bharti Mittal, Oscar Onyema, and John G. Coumantaros among others. In 2014, she became Executive Director at Africa Business News (ABN Group), the parent company of CNBC Africa and Forbes Africa. She left the positions in November 2017.

== Additional career ==
Nielsen moderated business and policy discussions at international forums, including the World Economic Forum, Milken Institute, and the African Development Bank. In 2017 alone, she moderated on World Economic Forum events in Switzerland (Davos), South Africa (Cape Town and Durban), UAE (Dubai), China (Dalian) and India (New Delhi).

Since 2016, Nielsen has been board member of the Graça Machel Trust and chairperson of its Women in Media Network.

In 2018, Nielsen founded The Nielsen Network, a Johannesburg-based communications and media consulting firm and has served as its CEO since. The firm offers services in providing media training and strategic communications advisory services in Africa and internationally.

== Recognition ==
- 2007: Telkom ICT Journalist of the Year.
