= Bronwyn Parry =

Researcher

- Born: Bronwyn Catherine Parry
- Citizenship: Australia & The United Kingdom
- Education: The University of Cambridge
- Occupation: Dean of Australian National University
- Spouse(s): Sally, (married 2016–present)
- Children: Alex, Jacob

Bronwyn Parry is an academic who currently serves as the Dean of the Australian National University's College of Arts and Social Sciences, a position she began in early November 2022. She focuses on social impact initiatives within academic settings. Prior to this role, Bronwyn worked at King's College London from 2016 to 2022 where she held the position of Vice President & Vice Principal for Service (2020–2022) and was a Professor in Global Health & Social Medicine (2016–2022).

She was the first female carpenter in the Australian film and television industry.

== Early life ==
Parry was born in Queensland. She moved to Canberra at the age of 16 to complete her higher school certificate and later to Sydney where she trained as a cabinet maker. She later went on to become Australia's first female carpenter in the film and television industry working on notable films such as Mad Max Beyond Thunderdome, Mad Max 2 and Dead Calm, as well as the opening of the Commonwealth Games. At the age of 29 she enrolled as a mature age student at Macquarie University studying Liberal Arts where she won the university medal. She later moved to the United Kingdom to complete a PhD in Geography at the University of Cambridge on a Commonwealth Scholarship.

Bronwyn began her professional academic career at The University of Cambridge as a Junior Research Fellow from 1997 to 2000 and then as a Senior Research Fellow from 2000 to 2004.

In 2004 she began working at Queen Mary as a Reader In Cultural and Economic Geography. In 2011, with funding from the Wellcome Trust, Bronwyn collaborated with photographer Ania Dabrowska on a project about memory, dementia and brain donation entitled Mind Over Matter. An exhibition related to this project was shown at Shoreditch Town Hall in October 2011 and as part of the Wellcome Trust's wider The Brain: Mind as Matter display.

Bronwyn was appointed to a chair at King's College London (KCL) in 2012 to establish the Department of Global Health and Social Medicine alongside Professor Nikolas Rose. Later she was made inaugural Head of the School of Global Affairs at KCL. In 2016, Bronwyn became Director of the King's Sanctuary Programme, which welcomes forced migrants to the institution and community. The program offers comprehensive education and research on migration and works to develop practical plans to improve the lives of forced migrants in the UK. From 2016- 2019 she was Academic Lead of the Padileia refugee student education consortium. In June 2020, Bronwyn was appointed as vice president and Vice Principal for Service at KCL and continued to introduce and develop various social impact programmes within the institution including the UK's first University Refugee Sponsorship Scheme for Ukrainian refugees fleeing the Russo-Ukrainian War, providing them with education and accommodation within the KCL community.

It was announced in mid-2022 that Bronwyn would become the Executive Dean of The Australian National University's College of Arts and Social Sciences. She took up this position in early November 2022.

In November 2023, Bronwyn secured a $16 million AUD grant from the European Union to undertake a project spanning six years, investigating the relationship between cooling technologies and global warming.

== Personal life ==
Bronwyn lives with her wife Sally in Canberra. They have two sons, Alex and Jacob. She is an advocate for LGBT rights, migrant rights and the Dignity in Dying campaign organisation.

== Selected works ==
- Bioinformation (2017)
- Bodies across borders: The global circulation of body parts, medical tourists and professionals (2015)
- Mind Over Matter: Memory, Forgetting, Brain Donation and the Search for Cures for Dementia (2011)
- Trading the Genome: Investigating the commodification of Bio-information (2004)
