= Jane Dutton =

South African broadcast journalist

- Born: Jane
- Citizenship: South African
- Occupation: journalist
- Employer(s): Al Jazeera, eNCA
- Notable work: Inside Story

Jane Dutton is a South African broadcast journalist, who worked for Al Jazeera English.

== Career ==
Jane worked with Al Jazeera from September 2005, in the run-up to the launch of the station, until 29 June 2018, when she left to return to South Africa. She was based at the main broadcast-centre, in Doha in Qatar. Due to family commitments, she later specialised in studio-based journalism. She was one of the key anchors at the station and her work ranged from news-reading, to hosting studio-based interview programmes and to voice-overs and continuity. As a news-correspondent, Jane covered stories in the United States, in Europe and in her native Africa, from South Africa to Egypt. As the host of studio-based talk-shows, Jane was a regular host of Inside Story, the daily programme that analyses a topical issue from the news, with the aid of guests from inside and outside the country in question. She was also a host for the weekly programme Inside Syria, that analyses recent developments in the war-torn country.

In July 2018 Jane joined eNCA presenting her show Tonight with Jane Dutton in the 8pm weekday slot which is broadcast from Johannesburg.
