= Bronwyn Wake =

Australian scientist

Bronwyn Wake is an Australian scientist and the editor in chief of Nature Climate Change.

== Education ==
Wake has a first class honors degree in Antarctic studies and a PhD in trace element biogeochemistry. She undertook postgraduate research at the University of Tasmania.

== Career ==
Wake undertook postdoctoral work at the University of Southampton, and at the European Institute for Marine Studies in Brest where she studied trace metals cycling in oceans and their role as micronutrients for phytoplankton.

Wake joined the editorial department of Nature Climate Change in 2012 and became the editor in chief in 2016.

== Personal life ==
Wake is Australian, she moved from there to London, before relocating to Scotland.
