= IEEE Transactions on Education =

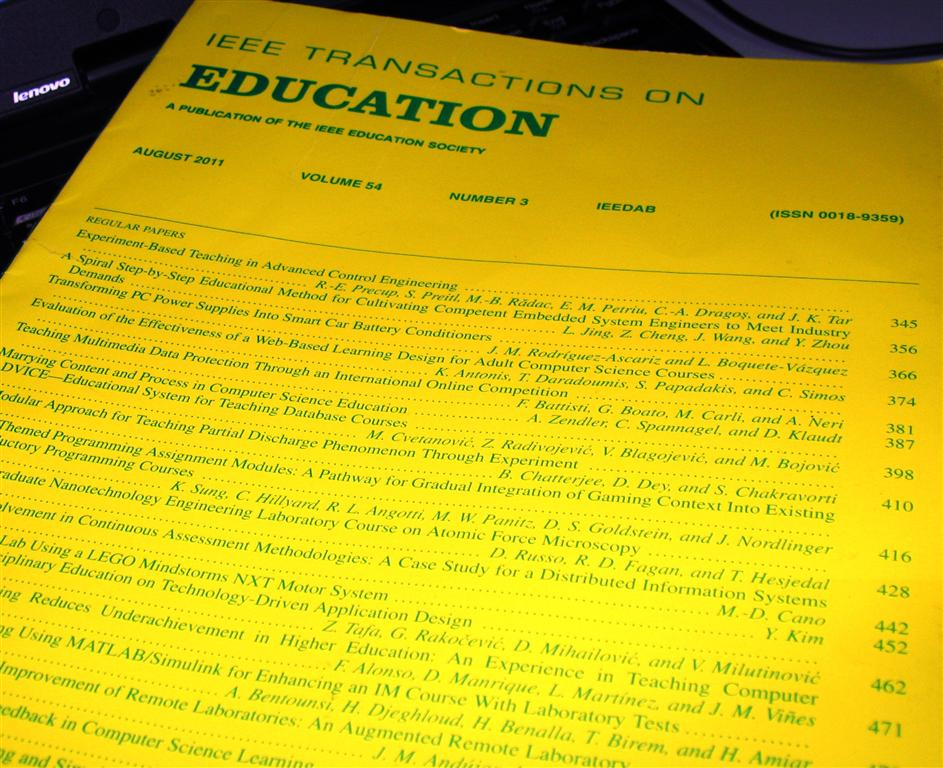
- Discipline: Engineering education
- Language: English
- Edited by: Ann Sobel

Publication details
- Former name: IRE Transactions on Education
- History: 1958–present
- Publisher: IEEE Education Society
- Frequency: Quarterly
- Impact factor: 2.274 (2018)

Standard abbreviations
- ISO 4: IEEE Trans. Educ.

Indexing
- CODEN: IEEDAB
- ISSN: 0018-9359 (print); 1557-9638 (web)
- LCCN: 64000974
- OCLC no.: 1752549

Links
- Journal homepage; Online access

IEEE Transactions on Education is a quarterly peer-reviewed academic journal on engineering education that is published by the IEEE Education Society. It covers the area of education research, methods, materials, programs, and technology in electrical engineering, computer engineering, and fields within the scope of interest of the Institute of Electrical and Electronics Engineers. The journal was known as the IRE Transactions on Education from 1958 through 1962. The editor-in-chief is Ann Sobel (Miami University).

According to the Journal Citation Reports, the journal has a 2018 impact factor of 2.274.

== Editors-in-chief ==
The following people are or have been editor-in-chief:

- 2023– : Ann Sobel (Miami University)
- 2019–2023: John E. Mitchell (University College London)
- 2013–2018: Jeffrey E. Froyd (Texas A&M University)
- 2007–2012: Charles B. Fleddermann (University of New Mexico)
- 2001–2005: David A. Conner (University of Alabama at Birmingham)
- 1997–2000: Ted E. Batchman
- 1994–1996: M. Molen
- 1988–1993: Frank S. Barnes
- 1985–1987: C. Alexander
- 1982–1984: Edwin C. Jones, Jr. (Iowa State University)
- 1979–1981: Thomas K. Gaylord (Georgia Institute of Technology)
- 1976–1978: Demetrius T. Paris
- 1973–1975: Gerald R. Peterson
- 1970–1972: Roy H. Mattson
- 1962–1969: Sidney S. Shamis (New York University)
- 1959–1961: W. R. LePage
- 1958: Ted A. Hunter
