= Stan Deno =

American educational psychologist

Stanley L. Deno
- Born: Minneapolis, Minnesota
- Died: October 12, 2016
- Education: Roosevelt High School (diploma, 1954); St. Olaf College (bachelor's degree, 1958); University of Minnesota (Ph.D., 1965)
- Spouse: Dina (m. 1965–2016)
- Awards: Fulbright Scholar in Taiwan (1982–83); 2017 University of Minnesota Outstanding Achievement Award (posthumous)
- Scientific career
- Fields: Educational psychology
- Institutions: University of Delaware; University of Minnesota
- Thesis: Multiple Discrimination Learning as a Function of Conceptual Similarity Among Picture and Word Stimuli (1965)
- Doctoral advisor: D.C. Neale
- Notable students: Russell Skiba

Stanley Lynn "Stan" Deno (died October 12, 2016) was an American educational psychologist and professor of educational psychology at the University of Minnesota, where he was also the director of the Special Education Program.
