= J. R. Kantor =

American psychologist

Jacob Robert "J.R." Kantor (August 8, 1888, Harrisburg, Pennsylvania – 1984, Chicago, Illinois) was a prominent American psychologist who pioneered a naturalistic system in psychology called interbehavioral psychology or interbehaviorism. He was the first to use the term "psycholinguistics" in his book An Objective Psychology of Grammar in 1936.

== Biography ==
Kantor was born in Harrisburg, Pennsylvania, the son of Julius Kantor, a Lithuanian-born orthodox rabbi, and Mary, a Lithuanian, who immigrated to Pennsylvania some years before the birth of Kantor. Kantor had two brothers and four sisters. He entered the University of Chicago with an interest in chemistry, but then discovered his love for psychology. In 1914, Kantor earned a Ph.B. He earned his Ph.D. in 1917 and was an instructor at the University of Chicago from 1917 to 1920. Kantor married Helen Rich in 1916. Their only child was Helene J. Kantor (1919-1993), archaeologist and professor at the Oriental Institute of the University of Chicago.

As Helene had been born with a progressive muscular dystrophy, Kantor accepted a position as a professor at Indiana University where he would remain for 39 years. This period overlapped for a brief time with B. F. Skinner's tenure there, to their mutual benefit. Kantor was also one of the founders of the journal The Psychological Record in 1937.

Following the death of his wife in 1956, Kantor retired in 1959 but continued teaching as a visiting professor at New York University and then at the University of Maryland. He was appointed to the position of research associate at the University of Chicago in 1964, and worked there until the time of his death twenty years later.

== Interbehaviorism ==
Kantor originally named his system Organismic Psychology, but around the time of the publication of the first volume of his Principles of Psychology (Kantor, 1924), he had already renamed it to interbehavioral psychology. Interbehaviorism as developed by Kantor was characterized as "field-theoretic, not lineal-mechanistic, self-actional, or mediational; a system that is naturalistic, not dualistic; and a system that is comprehensive, not narrowly focused." (Midgley & Morris, 2006). At the University of Chicago, Kantor was heavily influenced by the pragmatism and functionalism of Dewey (who had retired earlier from the University), Angell, and Mead. Kantor was also heavily impressed by the development of relativity theory in physics. It was from these two sources, as well as from his historical inquiry, that Kantor devoted himself to the creation of a naturalistic system in psychology. Kantor saw a similar goal in the recently developed school of behaviorism, although he saw it as reductionistic and simplistic, and not completely separated from mentalism. His conclusion was that in order to do so, behaviorism had to embrace a field orientation.

For Kantor, because the interaction between organism and environment is continuous in time this event should be analyzed in terms of all of its interdependent components. This led to the proposal of the interbehavioral field as the unit of analysis. Kantor represented this field with the formula PE = C(k, sf, rf, hi, st, md) where PE is the psychological event, consisting of the interdependence (C) of the factors in the field, k stands for the specificity of every behavior segment, sf is the stimulus function, rf is the response function, hi stands for the history of interactions, st corresponds to the interactional setting, and md is the medium of contact. According to Kantor, this interbehavioral field is at the core of every psychological event, and this event is not reducible to any of the individual factors.

Kantor used this conceptualization to analyze various sub-fields of psychology, as well as the relation of psychology with other disciplines. Among the major topics that he addressed in an interbehavioral manner can be found social psychology, psycholinguistics (a term he created and used for the first time in 1936, in his book An Objective Psychology of Grammar, and was used much more frequently by his pupil Nicholas Henry Pronko where it was used for the first time to talk about an interdisciplinary science "that could be coherent". in 1946), physiological psychology, and logic.

== Published books ==
- 1924. Principles of psychology (Vol. I). New York: Knopf.
- 1926. Principles of psychology (Vol. II). New York: Knopf.
- 1929. An outline of social psychology. Chicago: Follett.
- 1933. A survey of the science of psychology. Bloomington, IN: Principia Press.
- 1936. An objective psychology of grammar. Bloomington, IN: Indiana University Press.
- 1945. Psychology and logic (Vol. I). Bloomington, IN: Principia Press.
- 1947. Problems of physiological psychology. Bloomington, IN: Principia Press.
- 1950. Psychology and logic (Vol. II). Bloomington, IN: Principia Press.
- 1953. The logic of modern science. Bloomington, IN: Principia Press.
- 1958. Interbehavioral psychology. Bloomington, IN: Principia Press. (Rev. ed. 1959)
- 1963. The scientific evolution of psychology (Vol. I). Chicago: Principia Press.
- 1969. The scientific evolution of psychology (Vol. II). Chicago: Principia Press.
- 1971. The aim and progress of psychology and other sciences: A selection of papers by J. R. Kantor. Chicago: Principia Press.
- 1975. with Smith, N. W. The science of psychology: An interbehavioral survey. Chicago: Principia Press.
- 1977. Psychological linguistics. Chicago: Principia Press.
- 1981. Interbehavioral philosophy. Chicago: Principia Press.
- 1982. Cultural psychology. Chicago: Principia Press.
- 1983. Tragedy and the event continuum. Chicago: Principia Press.
- 1984. Psychological comments and queries. Chicago: Principia Press.
- 1984. Selected writings in philosophy, psychology and other sciences, 1929-1983. Chicago: Principia Press

== Sources ==
Midgley, B. D., & Morris, E. K. (Eds.) (2006). Modern Perspectives on J. R. Kantor and Interbehaviorism. Reno, NV: Context Press.

== See also ==
- Linda J. Hayes
