= The Psychological Record =

Academic journal

- Discipline: Behavior analysis
- Language: English
- Edited by: Yors García

Publication details
- History: 1937–present
- Publisher: Springer Science+Business Media
- Frequency: Quarterly
- Impact factor: 1.026 (2017)

Standard abbreviations
- ISO 4: Psychol. Rec.

Indexing
- CODEN: PYRCAI
- ISSN: 0033-2933 (print); 2163-3452 (web)
- OCLC no.: 67062043

Links
- Journal homepage; Online archive

The Psychological Record is a quarterly peer-reviewed scientific journal covering behavior analysis. It was established in 1937 by Jacob Robert Kantor, with B.F. Skinner serving as founding editor of the journal's experimental department. It is published by the Association for Behavior Analysis International in partnership with Springer Science+Business Media; before that, it was published by Southern Illinois University, Carbondale. The editor-in-chief is Yors García (Pontificia Universidad Javeriana, Bogotá, Colombia). According to the Journal Citation Reports, the journal has a 2017 impact factor of 1.026.

== See also ==
- Florence DiGennaro Reed
