= Keller Plan =

Method of instruction based on behavioral theories of Skinner

The Keller Plan, also called the Personalized System of Instruction (PSI), was developed by Fred S. Keller with J. Gilmour Sherman, Carolina Bori, and Rodolpho Azzi in the middle 1960s as an innovative method of instruction for the then-new University of Brasília. PSI was conceived of as an application of Skinner's theories of learning, grounded in operant conditioning strategies of behaviorism.

== Principles ==
Keller argued that effective instruction should incorporate five principles, the essential elements of the Keller Plan:

- Written materials—The primary presentation of new content should be through written texts. Given the forms of media available at the time when the Keller Plan was developed (e.g., lectures, movies, audio records, television, radio, paper-based text, etc.), paper-based texts gave students the greatest freedom; books and texts are portable, can be read at one's own pace, can be started and stopped at any time, can be easily reviewed, and can be marked by the reader. As an application of behaviorism, the Keller Plan was meant to maximize the number of operant behaviors that could be reinforced; this could best be done with written materials rather than have the learner be a passive observer of other media. Digital media available today could not provide the same kinds of learner control. Presumably, unintended consequences might arise if incorporated into a contemporary implementation of PSI, due to many additional operant behaviors that cannot be controlled by the student or teacher.
- Units of content—Subject matter material should be broken down into separable, meaningful units. These units could have various kinds of relationships; for example, one could provide prerequisites for understanding a second, or the second could provide deeper elaboration of a preceding unit. In any case, specific learning objectives should be definable for each discrete unit of content.
- Self-paced instruction—Students should be allowed to advance through the course material at their own pace. While an instructor might specify the order in which learning units are completed, the learners should decide when and at what rate they learn. Learners could move through a course as quickly or slowly as they choose.
- Unit mastery—Students must satisfy a mastery requirement in one unit before proceeding to the next. Typically, a unit in PSI would have more than one equivalent form of assessment—for example, three quizzes of equal difficulty or three primary sources or data sets to be analyzed. Students must demonstrate mastery of a unit's objectives to a certain level of quality. If the student does not reach the threshold, they are redirected to unit materials (or supplements if provided) and then take an equivalent form of the unit assessment. From the point of view of behaviorism, demonstrating mastery and being allowed to continue to a subsequent unit was presumed to be reinforcing
- Proctors—Human proctors are an important part of the Keller Plan. The proctors could be "external" to the course (adults or peers brought to the course from external sources) or "internal" (advanced students in the course who are doing well, have completed all units to date, and have good interpersonal skills). Proctors were the arbiters of unit mastery; they would "certify" mastery, discuss areas of weakness, and direct students to the next units. Behaviorists were always concerned about bringing conditioned behaviors under the control of "natural" reinforcers; interactions with the proctors were presumed to provide natural social reinforcers that encouraged learning behaviors and perseverance in the course.

While traditional teaching is "same pace, different learning", a key distinguishing factor of PSI is that it instead advocates "different pace, same learning". A traditional course might have all students follow the same weekly lectures, exercises, etc., and then sit an end-of-course exam at the same date — but possibly with huge variation in learning outcomes (e.g., 95% achievement for a strong student, but just 55% for a weak one). In a course run according to PSI, all students must pass a high threshold of achievement on each module within the course (for instance 90%). The difference between weak and strong students would then be that the stronger ones be able to finish the course quicker, while the weaker ones would need more time.

== Application ==
The Keller Plan has mainly been used in higher education, particularly as a more personalized form of instruction in large classes, but there is nothing inherent in Keller's formulation to restrict its application to particular grade levels, content, or types of courses; for instance the papers and report on usage in elementary school and junior high school, respectively. There has been a good deal of research on the effectiveness of PSI which indicated that it had robust, significantly positive effects on learning when compared to more traditional lecture-based formats. However, in some cases, self-pacing was also seen to have problems with student withdrawal and procrastination.

In spite of much documented success, PSI has not taken off massively. Education is still dominated by "same pace, different learning" approaches, and the number of new research publications about PSI gradually declined after its heyday in the 70's. Several possible reasons are given for this, not the least that PSI represented a too radical deviation from established teaching practices and educational management routines. Other explanations include conflicts within the PSI movement and the challenge that PSI demands more teaching effort. However, it has been speculated that PSI might see a revival with modern educational technology, as information technology could gradually alleviate teacher burdens related to frequent testing and feedback, as well as mitigate the increased administrative complexity that courses with student self-pacing have over those with instructor-set pace.
