= School Psychology Review =

- Discipline: Educational psychology and school psychology
- Language: English
- Edited by: Amy L. Reschly

Publication details
- History: 1972–present
- Publisher: National Association of School Psychologists (United States)
- Frequency: Quarterly
- Impact factor: 1.353 (2018)

Standard abbreviations
- ISO 4: Sch. Psychol. Rev.

Indexing
- ISSN: 0279-6015
- OCLC no.: 818925432

Links
- Journal homepage

School Psychology Review is a quarterly peer-reviewed academic journal published by the National Association of School Psychologists. It was established in 1972 and covers issues related to educational psychology, specifically school psychology. The editor-in-chief is Shane Jimerson (University of California Santa Barbara).

== Abstracting and indexing ==
The journal is abstracted and indexed in the Social Sciences Citation Index and Academic Search Complete. According to the Journal Citation Reports, the journal has a 2013 impact factor of 1.655, ranking it 15th out of 53 journals in the category "Psychology, Educational".

== See also ==
- Florence DiGennaro Reed
