= Behavior Modification (journal) =

- Discipline: Psychology
- Language: English
- Edited by: Alan S. Bellack

Publication details
- History: 1977–present
- Publisher: SAGE Publications
- Frequency: Bimonthly
- Impact factor: 2.024 (2017)

Standard abbreviations
- ISO 4: Behav. Modif.

Indexing
- CODEN: BEMOD
- ISSN: 0145-4455 (print); 1552-4167 (web)
- LCCN: 77648534
- OCLC no.: 422718908

Links
- Journal homepage; Online access; Online archive

Behavior Modification (BMO) is a peer-reviewed academic journal about applied behavior modification. The editor is Alan S. Bellack (University of Maryland). It was established in 1977 and is currently published by SAGE Publications. This journal is a member of the Committee on Publication Ethics (COPE).

== Abstracting and indexing ==
Behavior Modification is abstracted and indexed in Scopus and the Social Sciences Citation Index. According to the Journal Citation Reports, its 2017 impact factor is 2.024, ranking it 60 out of 127 journals in the category "Psychology, Clinical".
