= Bronwyn Jones =

Bronwyn Jones may refer to:

- Bronwyn Jones (singer), known as Eve Libertine
- Bronwyn Jones (Fireman Sam), character in Fireman Sam
