= Association for Behavior Analysis International =

Trade group focusing on behavior analysis

- Founded: 1974
- Founded at: Kalamazoo, Michigan, U.S.
- Type: Nonprofit, 501(c)(6)
- Tax ID no.: 38-2123143
- Location: Portage, Michigan, U.S.
- Key people: Dr. Maria Malott (CEO/Secretary/Treasurer); Lian Soh (Business Director); Geok Davis (Finance Director); Dr. M. Christopher Newland (President); Dr. Kent Johnson (President-elect)
- Subsidiaries: Society for the Advancement of Behavior Analysis (501[c][3]); Portage Creek Condominiums (C corporation)
- Revenue: $4,872,673 (Fiscal year ending August 31, 2023)
- Expenses: $4,145,697 (Fiscal year ending August 31, 2023)
- Staff: 29 employees (2022)
- Volunteers: 350 (Fiscal year ending August 31, 2023)
- Website: www.abainternational.org

The Association for Behavior Analysis International (ABAI), legally the Association for Behavior Analysis Inc., is a nonprofit organization dedicated to promoting behavior analysis. The organization has over 9,000 members. The group organizes conferences and publishes journals on the topic of applied behavior analysis (ABA). ABAI has issued detailed, specific position papers intended to guide practitioners of ABA. The ABAI publishes six scholarly journals including The Psychological Record and their primary organ, Perspectives on Behavior Science, formerly The Behavior Analyst. They also publish an informational journal, Education and Treatment of Children, describing practical treatment of children with behavioral problems.

ABAI has been criticized for its connections to the Judge Rotenberg Center (JRC), a school that has been condemned by the United Nations for torture. According to the Autistic Self Advocacy Network (ASAN), ABAI has endorsed the methods of the JRC, including its use of the graduated electronic decelerator, a torture device that delivers painful electric skin shocks, by allowing them to present at ABAI's annual conferences. ABAI has honored Robert A. Sherman for his legal defense of the JRC's use of aversive punishments on its students. In 2022, ABAI's membership voted to issue a position statement that unconditionally condemned the use of contingent electric skin shock (CESS).

== History ==
ABAI was founded in 1974 as the MidWestern Association for Behavior Analysis to serve as an interdisciplinary group of professionals, paraprofessionals, and students. The first annual conference was a response by a group of behavior analysts who were having problems presenting their work at psychology conferences and other related events. Some of the members included Sidney Bijou, James Dinsmoor, Bill Hopkins, and Roger Ulrich. The first headquarters were located on the campus of Western Michigan University (WMU) in Kalamazoo, Michigan. The association changed its name to the Association for Behavior Analysis in 1979. In 2002, the headquarters were moved off WMU's campus. In 2008, the association relocated to nearby Portage, Michigan (where it is today), and added "International" to its name. ABAI has more than 9,000 members and 28,000 affiliate members.

ABAI serves the field of behavior analysis in three ways. First, ABAI supports three areas of study that comprise the broader discipline: (a) the experimental analysis of behavior, which is dedicated to basic research and research methods; (b) ABA, which uses respondent and operant conditioning to modify human and animal behavior; and (c) the philosophical, conceptual, and theoretical foundations of behavior analysis. Second, ABAI supports the practice of behavior analysis, which applies behavioral principles to improve the conditions of people in workplaces, clinics, and schools, and other animals (e.g., companion, zoo, research, working) through intervention and prevention. Finally, ABAI serves its members by providing an organizational structure through which scientists and practitioners—both within and related to the discipline—can share and disseminate knowledge. This structure includes (a) leadership in the form of an elected executive council and several boards and committees; (b) administration, including a chief operating officer and 20 staff members; and (c) organizational services. The services include support for over 50 special interest groups and 90 nationally and internationally affiliated chapters; numerous award programs; position statements and task force reports on client and student rights (e.g., effective education and treatment) and interventions that lack empirical support and/or have significant ethical implications (e.g., contingent electric skin shock, conversion therapy, facilitated communication); planning and managing conferences, including a main conference held annually in May, annual autism conferences, biennial international conferences, and specialty conferences (e.g., conceptual issues, culturo-behavior science, substance abuse); and the publication of scholarly journals (e.g., The Analysis of Verbal Behavior, Behavior Analysis in Practice, Behavior and Social Issues, Perspectives on Behavior Science) and a newsletter – Inside Behavior Analysis.

== Activities and positions ==
=== Conferences ===
ABAI organizes various conferences related to the practice and promotion of behavior analysis. Every two years, ABAI hosts an international conference. The association also holds an annual autism conference, and an annual conference dedicated to the advancements of behavior analysis. Additionally, ABAI has hosted many single-track conferences on topics of special interest to behavior analysts, such as theory and philosophy, climate change, behavioral economics, and education. The JRC has attended some ABAI conferences to promote their organization, which has been condemned by the United Nations as having used methods which have been classified as torture.

=== Journals ===
ABAI publishes six journals about behavior analysis:

- The Analysis of Verbal Behavior is a collection of experiments and theoretical papers regarding verbal behavior and ABA.
- Behavior Analysis in Practice is a peer-reviewed journal that includes articles on how to efficiently practice ABA.
- Perspectives on Behavior Science (previously The Behavior Analyst) is a journal that includes literary reviews, reinterpretations of published data, theoretical and experimental articles, and articles that discuss behaviorism as a philosophy.
- The Psychological Record includes articles concerning behavioral analysis, behavioral science, and behavior theory. It was founded in 1937 by Jacob Robert Kantor.
- Behavior and Social Issues
- Education and Treatment of Children

=== Position statements ===
ABAI has published seven position statements which are nominated and voted on by membership. These include:

- Position Statement on the Use of CESS, 2022
- Statement on Conversion Therapy and Practices, 2022
- Expression of Support for the Asian-American Pacific Islander Community, 2021
- Commitment of Equity, 2020
- Restraint and Seclusion, 2010
- Facilitated Communication, 1995
- Students' Rights to Effective Education, 1990
- Right to Effective Behavioral Treatment, 1989

Queens College psychology professor and ABAI member Peter Sturmey has suggested that practitioners use these statements to guide their practice.

=== Funding ===
The Society for the Advancement of Behavior Analysis (SABA) provides financial support for ABAI activities and serves as a clearinghouse for outside funding of ABAI activities.

=== Awards ===
Through the sister organization of SABA, several categories of awards are given to individuals, organizations, and ABA researchers during the ABAI annual convention.

As of 2022, they offer 5 awards:

- The Distinguished Service to Behavior Analysis
- The Scientific Translation
- The International Dissemination of Behavior Analysis
- The Effective Presentation of Behavior Analysis in the Mass Media
- The Enduring Programmatic Contributions in Behavior Analysis

== Controversy ==
One activist group, ASAN, has issued critical statements about ABAI, suggesting that it provides a platform for the JRC, a controversial school that uses aversives. Additionally, in January 2006, future ASAN president Ari Ne'eman reviewed two books for the website Vox in which he criticized both the Autism Society of America and ABAI for not prohibiting the employees of JRC from submitting presentations while it was concurrently under investigation from the Food and Drug Administration, the United States Department of Justice, and the United Nations Special Rapporteur on Torture.

In 1987, ABAI gave lawyer Robert Sherman the Humanitarian Award for the Right to Effective Treatment for winning a case that guaranteed the JRC the right to continue using aversives on its students. According to the ASAN, ABAI has endorsed the JRC's use of the graduated electronic decelerator, an aversive device that administers painful electric shocks and has been condemned by the United Nations as torture, by allowing them to present at their annual conferences.

The Therapist Neurodiversity Collective made a statement about ABAI's connection to the JRC: "We are appalled and horrified that the Association for Behavior Analysis International (ABAI) chooses to condone painful electric shock aversion therapy at the Judge Rotenberg Center, which the United Nations Special Rapporteur on Torture has condemned. We are horrified that the JRC will continue the fight to be allowed to continue torturing human beings."

In 2022, ABAI's membership voted to issue a position statement that unconditionally condemned the use of CESS. The following year, the ABAI task-force members assigned to investigate the use of CESS reported that only 35 percent of ABAI's voting members supported their draft version of the position statement, which would have supported the use of CESS "in the most extraordinary of circumstances." The task-force members recommended that individual patients or their parents/guardians be permitted to choose CESS as a treatment option under certain conditions and that CESS (or punishment in general) did not inherently violate ethical standards set by ABAI or the Behavior Analyst Certification Board. This was a revised version of a report the task force distributed to ABAI membership prior to the 2022 vote.

In May 2024, ABAI allowed several JRC staff members, including Clinical Director Nathan Blenkush, to conduct a continuing-education symposium at its 50th annual convention. In March 2025, ABAI released a continuing-education webinar presented by JRC board member Margaret Uwayo.

== See also ==
- Behavior analysis of child development
- Society for the Experimental Analysis of Behavior
