= Bronwyn Hemsley =

Australian speech pathologist

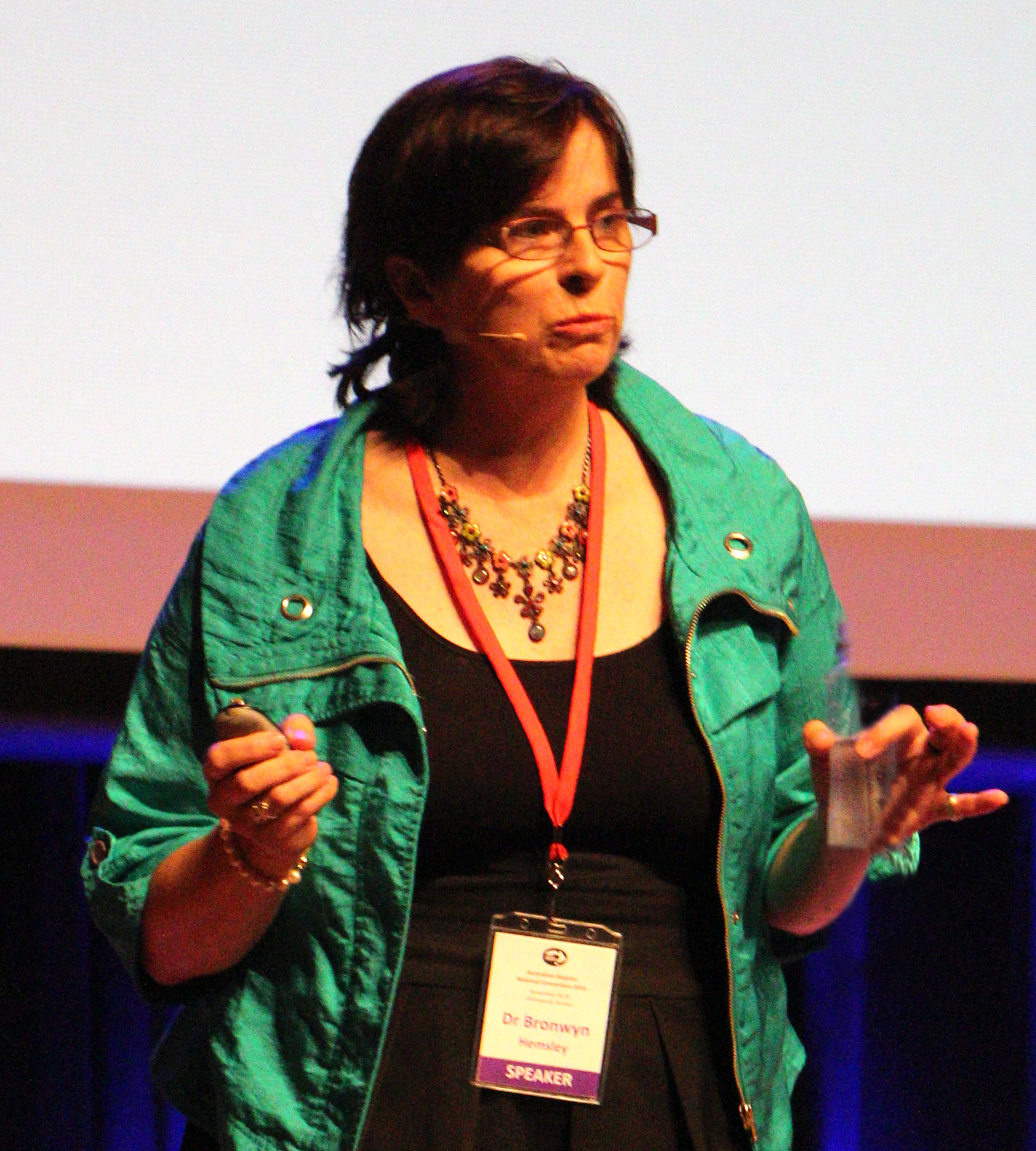
Bronwyn Hemsley

Bronwyn Hemsley is an Australian speech pathologist, head of speech pathology at the University of Technology Sydney (UTS) and co-lead of the UTS Disability Research Network.

== Career ==
She started her academic career as a lecturer at the University of Sydney in 2008. Then she joined as a National Health and Medical Research Council (NHMRC) Postdoctoral Research Fellow at the University of Queensland from 2009 to 2012. She joined the University of Newcastle as a senior lecturer then promoted as an associate professor in speech pathology in the same university. Currently she is a professor of speech pathology at the University of Technology Sydney.

== Education ==
Hemsley obtained a Bachelor of Applied Science in speech pathology from the University of Sydney in 1988. She got her PhD in communication sciences and disorders 2008 from the same university.

== Research ==
Her research interests include communication, swallowing, social media, and other advanced assistive technologies for people with speech and swallowing difficulties. Hemsley has also been noted for her critical stance on gestalt language processing (GLP), a position that has been controversial within the autism community. Some autistic advocates and clinicians argue that this stance, by privileging traditional speech therapy methods, may limit access to communication approaches that align with how many autistic children naturally acquire language, including gestalt, scripted, or alternative communication strategies, potentially delaying or restricting their language development and self-expression.Systematic review on GLP/NLA interventionsReframing Autism – Position Statement on Autistic Communication

== Awards ==
She won Discovery Early Career Research Award (DECRA). Hemsley won postgraduate teaching funds in 2019 and the Faculty Dean's Award for Research Excellence at UTS in 2021. She also won the Fellowship Award from the International Society for Augmentative and Alternative Communication (ISAAC).
