= Perspectives on Behavior Science =

- Discipline: Behavior analysis
- Language: English
- Edited by: Christine Hughes

Publication details
- Former name(s): The Behavior Analyst
- History: 1978–present
- Publisher: Springer Science+Business Media
- Frequency: Semiannual
- Impact factor: 2.0 (2022)

Standard abbreviations
- ISO 4: Perspect. Behav. Sci.

Indexing
- ISSN: 0738-6729 (print); 2196-8918 (web)
- LCCN: 83647787
- OCLC no.: 06281659

Links
- Journal homepage; Online archive

Perspectives on Behavior Science is a semiannual peer-reviewed scientific journal covering behavior analysis. It was established in 1978 and is published by Springer Science+Business Media on behalf of the Association for Behavior Analysis International, of which it is the official journal. It was published as The Behavior Analyst until it obtained its current name in 2018. The editor-in-chief is Christine Hughes (University of North Carolina Wilmington). According to its website, the journal has a 2022 impact factor of 2.0.
