= Society for the Experimental Analysis of Behavior =

Group that promotes the experimental analysis of behavior

The Society for the Experimental Analysis of Behavior was founded in 1957 by a group of researchers in the field of behaviorism. It publishes the Journal of the Experimental Analysis of Behavior and the Journal of Applied Behavior Analysis.

The Certificate of Incorporation (dated October 29, 1957) of the society states that:

The purpose and objects of this corporation shall be to encourage, foster, and promote the advancement of the science of experimental analysis of behavior; the promotion of research in the said science and the increase and diffusion of knowledge of the said science by the conduct of a program of education by meetings, conferences and symposia, and by the publication of journals, papers, periodicals and reports.

The Journal of the Experimental Analysis of Behavior was established to meet the needs of those who were attracted to the behavior-analytic approach but were unhappy with the lack of a journal specializing in that rapidly growing area. As described on its inside front page ever since, the journal is "primarily for the original publication of experiments relevant to the behavior of individual organisms." It started as a quarterly in 1958 but has appeared bimonthly since 1964. The initial board of editors also served as the first board of directors of the society.

In 1968, the society established the Journal of Applied Behavior Analysis for "the original publication of reports of experimental research involving applications of the experimental analysis of behavior to problems of social importance." It appears quarterly.
