= Journal of the Experimental Analysis of Behavior =

Peer-reviewed academic journal

Journal of the Experimental Analysis of Behavior (JEAB)
- Discipline: Behavior analysis, Experimental psychology
- Language: English

Publication details
- History: 1958–present
- Publisher: Wiley-Blackwell

Standard abbreviations
- ISO 4: J. Exp. Anal. Behav.

Indexing
- ISSN: 0022-5002

Links
- Journal homepage

The Journal of the Experimental Analysis of Behavior is a peer-reviewed academic journal of psychology that was established in 1958 by B.F. Skinner and Charles Ferster. JEAB publishes empirical research related to the experimental analysis of behavior and is published by Wiley-Blackwell on behalf of the Society for the Experimental Analysis of Behavior.The current editor-in-chief is Mark Galizio (University of North Carolina, Wilmington). The 2022 impact factor is 2.7.

The mission of the Journal of the Experimental Analysis of Behavior (JEAB) is "the original publication of experiments relevant to the behavior of individual organisms."

== See also ==
- Journal of Applied Behavior Analysis (JABA)
- Behavior Modification (journal)
- Society for the Experimental Analysis of Behavior
