= Journal of Applied Behavior Analysis =

- Discipline: Psychology, applied behavior analysis
- Language: English
- Edited by: Louis Hagopian

Publication details
- History: 1968–present
- Publisher: Wiley-Blackwell on behalf of the Society for the Experimental Analysis of Behavior (United States)
- Frequency: Quarterly
- Impact factor: 3 (2024)

Standard abbreviations
- ISO 4: J. Appl. Behav. Anal.

Indexing
- ISSN: 0021-8855 (print); 1938-3703 (web)
- OCLC no.: 1783308

Links
- Journal homepage; Online access; Online archive

The Journal of Applied Behavior Analysis (JABA) is a quarterly peer-reviewed academic journal which publishes empirical research related to applied behavior analysis (ABA). It was established in 1968 and is published by Wiley-Blackwell on behalf of the Society for the Experimental Analysis of Behavior. The editor-in-chief is Dr. Louis Hagopian.

Common areas of research in JABA include: functional analysis and treatment of severe behavior disorders, classroom instruction in secondary and higher education, early and intensive behavioral interventions for autistic children, voucher-based contingency management in the treatment of substance abuse, and pediatric feeding therapy. According to the journal's web site, article acceptance rate was 26% in 2024.

== Conversion therapy controversy ==
In 1974, JABA published a paper co-authored by psychologists Ole Ivar Lovaas and George Rekers, titled "Behavioral treatment of deviant sex-role behaviors in a male child." The paper described Lovaas and Rekers' use of operant conditioning to force Kirk Murphy (then a 4-year-old boy behaving in a traditionally feminine way) to behave in a traditionally masculine manner. Lovaas and Rekers said in the paper that they hoped experimenting on Murphy would help them develop a method to prevent "adult transsexualism or similar adult sex-role deviation."

Murphy died by suicide in 2003; some members of his family attributed his death to the psychological trauma he endured during the study. Despite a subsequent paper authored by Rekers concluding that Murphy's conditioning changed his sexual orientation from gay to heterosexual, his sister rejected that conclusion and claimed that Murphy "was conditioned to say that." After reviewing Murphy's journal entries, his sister described how he feared disclosing he was gay due to his father spanking him for playing with dolls and exhibiting other traditionally feminine behaviors. Murphy's brother stated, "I saw my brother's whole back side bruised so badly one time, my dad should have gone to jail for it."

In 2020, JABA added an expression of concern and an editor's note to the 1974 paper. The documents acknowledged the harm done by the study to Murphy and the LGBTQ+ community at large, while also claiming it did not violate the ethical standards of its time and could not be causally linked to Murphy's suicide. JABA also stated that conversion therapy was not representative of the field of ABA as a whole.

JABA's justification for not retracting the paper — that the study was conducted ethically for its time — was rejected by some members of academia, including Arthur Caplan, who founded the medical ethics division at the New York University Grossman School of Medicine, and Austin Johnson, the director of the school psychology program at the University of California, Riverside's Graduate School of Education. Caplan, who claimed he had "never seen such a 'historically oriented' disclosure," further stated, "I think many would have found punishing this behavior wrong by the standards of the day so I am not persuaded this note is accurate." Johnson stated, "Rekers and Lovaas abused Kirk Murphy, a cisgender gay man who ultimately committed suicide in 2003. The words used and actions described in Rekers and Lovaas are abusive and shameful. They did not have value in 1974. They do not have value now. To comply with editorial guidelines and basic human decency, JABA must retract this paper." Johnson also pointed out that the treatment of Murphy had been contemporaneously labeled unethical by some of Lovaas and Rekers' peers, including ABA researcher Donald M. Baer, and that the American Psychiatric Association had already depathologized homosexuality at the time the paper was published.

The extreme psychological harm caused by conversion therapy — defined as any attempt to change a person's sexual orientation, gender identity or gender expression — has been well documented, as has its ineffectiveness.

== Abstracting and indexing ==
The journal is abstracted and indexed in:

- Current Contents/Social & Behavioral Sciences
- Current Index to Statistics
- EBSCO databases
- Education Resources Information Center
- Index Medicus/MEDLINE/PubMed
- InfoTrac
- ProQuest databases
- PsycINFO/Psychological Abstracts
- Répertoire International de Littérature Musicale
- Scopus
- Social Sciences Citation Index
- SocINDEX

== See also ==
- Journal of the Experimental Analysis of Behavior
- Florence DiGennaro Reed
