= History of schizophrenia =

The word schizophrenia was coined by the Swiss psychiatrist Eugen Bleuler in 1908, and was intended to describe the separation of function between personality, thinking, memory, and perception. Bleuler introduced the term on 24 April 1908 in a lecture given at a psychiatric conference in Berlin and in a publication that same year. Bleuler later expanded his new disease concept into a monograph in 1911, which was finally translated into English in 1950.

According to some scholars, the disease has always existed only to be 'discovered' during the early 20th century. The plausibility of this claim depends upon the success of retrospectively diagnosing earlier cases of madness as 'schizophrenia'. According to others, 'schizophrenia' names a culturally determined clustering of mental symptoms. What is known for sure is that by the turn of the 20th century the old concept of insanity had become fragmented into 'diseases' (psychoses) such as paranoia, dementia praecox, manic-depressive insanity and epilepsy (Emil Kraepelin's classification). Dementia praecox was reconstituted as schizophrenia, paranoia was renamed as delusional disorder and manic-depressive insanity as bipolar disorder (epilepsy was transferred from psychiatry to neurology). The 'mental symptoms' included under the concept schizophrenia are real enough, affect people, and will always need understanding and treatment. However, whether the historical construct currently called 'schizophrenia' is required to achieve this therapeutic goal remains contentious.

== Diagnoses in ancient times ==
Accounts of a schizophrenia-like syndrome are thought to be rare in the historical record prior to the 19th century, although reports of irrational, unintelligible, or uncontrolled behavior were common. There has been an interpretation that brief notes in the Ancient Egyptian Ebers papyrus may imply schizophrenia, but other reviews have not suggested any connection. A review of ancient Greek and Roman literature indicated that although psychosis was described, there was no account of a condition meeting the criteria for schizophrenia.

Bizarre psychotic beliefs and behaviors similar to some of the symptoms of schizophrenia were reported in Arabic medical and psychological literature during the Middle Ages. In The Canon of Medicine, for example, Avicenna described a condition somewhat resembling the symptoms of schizophrenia which he called Junun Mufrit (severe madness), which he distinguished from other forms of madness (Junun) such as mania, rabies and manic depressive psychosis. However, no condition resembling schizophrenia was reported in Şerafeddin Sabuncuoğlu's Imperial Surgery, a major Ottoman medical textbook of the 15th century. It has been suggested that the visions experienced by Joan of Arc were the product of schizophrenia. Given limited historical evidence, schizophrenia (as prevalent as it is today) may be a modern phenomenon, or alternatively it may have been obscured in historical writings by related concepts such as melancholia or mania.

== Conceptual development ==
=== Influential earlier concepts ===
A detailed case report in 1809 by John Haslam concerning James Tilly Matthews, and a separate account by Philippe Pinel also published in 1809, are often regarded as the earliest cases of schizophrenia in the medical and psychiatric literature. The Latinized term dementia praecox entered psychiatry in 1886 in a textbook by asylum physician Heinrich Schüle (1840–1916) of the Illenau asylum in Baden. He used the term to refer to hereditarily predisposed individuals who were "wrecked on the cliffs of puberty" and developed acute dementia, while others developed the chronic condition of hebephrenia. Emil Kraepelin had cited Schüle's 1886 textbook in the 1887 second edition of his own textbook, Psychiatrie, and hence was familiar with this term at least six years before he himself adopted it. It later appeared in 1891 in a case report by Arnold Pick which argued that hebephrenia should be regarded as a form of dementia praecox. Kraepelin first used the term in 1893. In 1899 Emil Kraepelin introduced a broad new distinction in the classification of mental disorders between dementia praecox and mood disorder (termed manic depression and including both unipolar and bipolar depression). Kraepelin believed that dementia praecox was caused by a lifelong, smoldering systemic or "whole body" process of a metabolic nature that would eventually affect the functioning of the brain in a final decisive cascade. Hence, he believed the entire body—all the organs, glands and peripheral nervous system—was implicated in the natural disease process. Although he used the term "dementia," Kraepelin seemed to use the term synonymously with "mental weakness," mental defect," and "mental deterioration," but distinguished it from other uses of the term dementia, such as in Alzheimer's disease, which typically occur later in life. In 1853 Bénédict Morel used the term démence précoce (precocious or early dementia) to describe a group of young patients who were affected by "stupor". It is sometimes argued that this first use of the term signals the medical discovery of schizophrenia. However, Morel employed the phrase in a purely descriptive sense and he did not intend to delineate a new diagnostic category. Moreover, his traditional conception of dementia differed significantly from that employed in the latter half of the nineteenth-century. Finally, there is no evidence that Morel's démence précoce had any influence on the later development of the dementia praecox concept by either Arnold Pick or Emil Kraepelin.

Kraepelin's classification slowly gained acceptance. There were objections to the use of the term "dementia" despite cases of recovery, and some defence of diagnoses it replaced such as adolescent insanity. The concept of adolescent insanity or developmental insanity had been advanced by Scottish psychiatrist Sir Thomas Clouston in 1873, describing a psychotic condition which generally affected those aged 18–24 years, particularly males, and in 30% of cases proceeded to 'a secondary dementia'.

=== Coinage in 1908 and after ===
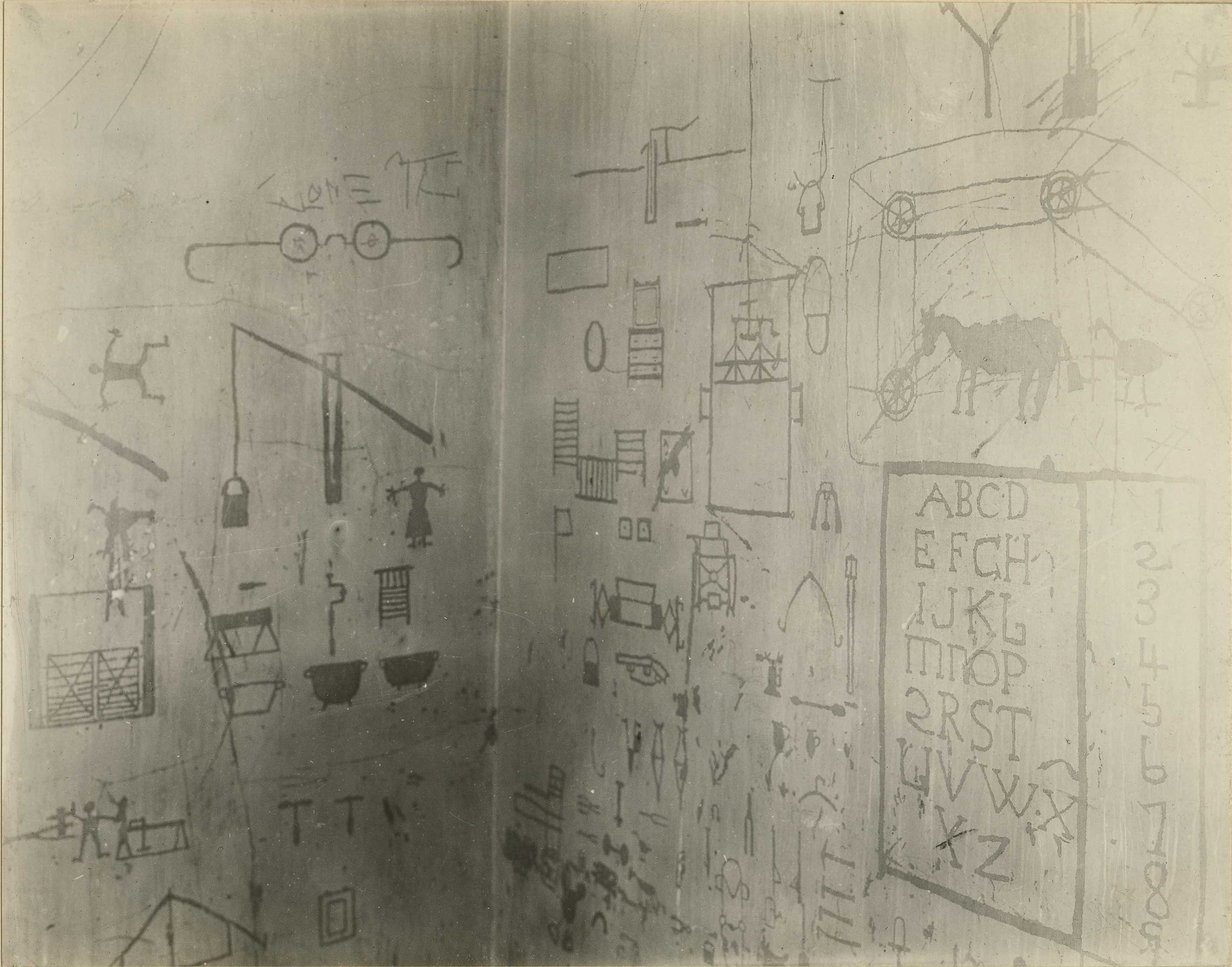
Scratch-drawings on the wall in St. Elizabeths Hospital made by a prisoner with "a disturbed case of dementia praecox".

Paul Eugen Bleuler first used the term "schizophreniegruppe", on April 24, 1908, during a lecture at a meeting of the German Psychiatric Association in Berlin. The word schizophrenia translates as "split mind" from the Greek roots schizein (σχίζειν, "to split") and phrēn, phren- (φρήν, φρεν-, "mind"). Bleuler coined the term to more aptly describe the separation of function between personality, thinking, memory, and perception in his patients. Bleuler later published his treatise on the subject, Dementia Praecox oder Gruppe der Schizophrenien, in 1911, which is recognised as his magnum opus. Bleuler's treatise describes the fundamental symptoms of the disorder as being of four A's: flattened Affect, Autism, impaired Association of ideas and Ambivalence. Bleuler sought to differentiate schizophrenia as not a form of dementia, but an entirely separate disorder since his subjects did not suffer from loss or distortion of their memories. Bleuler wrote in 1911 of his terminology:

I call dementia precox schizophrenia because, as I hope to show, the splitting of the different psychic functions is one of its most important features. In each case there is a more or less clear splitting of the psychological functions: as the disease becomes distinct, the personality loses its unity.

=== Attribution of credit for the origination of the concept ===
From the creation of the new term, at least two schools of thought arose after the acceptance of the idea. Some considered Bleuler as having a lesser position of influence with the creation of a novel reality, and instead continued his own thoughts from the initial tradition of Kraeplin, that is, Bleuler inherited the idea, which he then developed. Others, finding Bleuler the greater of the two individuals, believed he in fact discovered the reality of the disorder anew, using Kraeplin's indication of the existence of disorder but that there was no existing indication by Kraeplin of the new concept in the doctor's written observations and thoughts.

=== First-rank symptoms ===
In the early 20th century, the psychiatrist Kurt Schneider listed the forms of psychotic symptoms that he thought distinguished schizophrenia from other psychotic disorders. He termed these as first-rank symptoms. They include delusions of being controlled by an external force; the belief that thoughts are being inserted into or withdrawn from one's conscious mind; the belief that one's thoughts are being broadcast to other people; and hearing hallucinatory voices that comment on one's thoughts or actions or that have a conversation with other hallucinated voices. Although they have significantly contributed to the current diagnostic criteria, the specificity of first-rank symptoms has been questioned. A review of the diagnostic studies conducted between 1970 and 2005 found that they allow neither a reconfirmation nor a rejection of Schneider's claims, and suggested that first-rank symptoms should be de-emphasized in future revisions of diagnostic systems.

=== Deviation from the intended meaning ===
Many people after the 1908 inception of the term did not accept that schizo-, splitting or dissociation was an appropriate description, and the term would later have more significance as a source of confusion and social stigma than scientific meaning. In popular culture, the term schizophrenia is often thought to mean that affected persons have a "split personality". But for contemporary psychiatry, schizophrenia does not involve a person changing among distinct multiple personalities. The stigmatising confusion arises in part due to Bleuler's own use of the term schizophrenia, which for many signalled a split mind, and his documenting of a number of cases with split personalities within his classic 1911 description of schizophrenia. The earliest known use of the term to mean "split personality" was by psychologist G. Stanley Hall in 1916, and many early 20th-century psychiatrists and psychologists can also be found using the term in this sense (some reference Jekyll and Hyde) before a later rejection of this usage took place. The term schizophrenia used to be associated with split personality by the general population but that usage went into decline when split personality became known as a separate disorder, first as multiple personality disorder, and later as dissociative identity disorder.

== State abuses in the 20th century ==
=== Eugenics ===
In the first half of the 20th century schizophrenia was considered to be a hereditary defect, and affected people were subject to eugenics in many countries. Hundreds of thousands were sterilized, with or without consent—the majority in Nazi Germany, the United States, and Scandinavian countries. Along with other people labeled "mentally unfit", many diagnosed with schizophrenia were murdered in the Nazi "Action T4" program.

=== Schizophrenia under Nazi rule ===
In 1933 Dr. Ernst Rüdin, who was in-charge of the Genealogical-Demographic Department of the German Institute for Psychiatric Research in Munich, expressed his interest in schizophrenia and with the help of Franz Kallmann, supported the idea that schizophrenia was a Mendelian inherited disease. Kallmann believed that the disorder was transmitted by a regressive gene.

Both Rüdin's and Kallmann's theories coincided with the growing interest in the idea of Rassenhygiene or "race hygiene". The eugenics movement had gained great strength in the United States and Britain. Following suit, in 1933 Rüdin became a guiding force in the passage of Germany's first compulsory sterilization laws known as "the law for the prevention of progeny with hereditary defects" which would target individuals with an intellectual disability, schizophrenia, manic-depressive disorder, epilepsy, Huntington chorea, hereditary blindness and deafness, hereditary alcoholism or “grave bodily malformation.” It is suggested by the limited data available that of the 400,000 (1% of the entire population) that were sterilized, 132 000 were sterilized for schizophrenia.

According to E. Fuller Toddy and Robert H. Yolken, it was in 1939 that Hitler asked his private physician and his officials to draft a law that would allow the systematic killing of individuals with mental disorders, sticking to a claim that he had made shortly after assuming office in 1933: "it is right that the worthless lives of such creatures should be ended, and that this would result in certain savings in terms of hospitals, doctors and nursing staff." In 1932 Berthold Kihn had estimated that mentally ill patients were costing Germany 150 million Reichsmarks per year.

In October 1939, German psychiatric hospitals were asked to carry out a survey which established that 70,000 patients would qualify for. The program was known internally as Aktion (action) T–4. The patients were killed with the use of carbon monoxide which they were given in a closed "shower" room. According to Friedlander, the "overriding criterion" for selection for death in the T–4 program "was the ability to do productive work" useful by doing work such as dentistry or by pretending to be "asylum director". Psychiatric asylums implemented two diets: minimum calories for those who could work and a starvation diet of vegetables only for those who could not.

=== Politicization in the Soviet Union ===
In the Soviet Union the diagnosis of schizophrenia has also been used for political purposes. The prominent Soviet psychiatrist Andrei Snezhnevsky created and promoted an additional sub-classification of sluggishly progressing schizophrenia. This diagnosis was used to discredit and expeditiously imprison political dissidents while dispensing with a potentially embarrassing trial. The practice was exposed to Westerners by a number of Soviet dissidents, and in 1977 the World Psychiatric Association condemned the Soviet practice at the Sixth World Congress of Psychiatry. Rather than defending his claim that a latent form of schizophrenia caused dissidents to oppose the regime, Snezhnevsky broke all contact with the West in 1980 by resigning his honorary positions abroad.

== Development of treatments in the 20th century ==
Harry Stack Sullivan applied the approaches of Interpersonal psychotherapy to treating schizophrenia in the 1920s viewing early schizophrenia as a problem-solving attempt to integrate life experiences, arguing that recovered patients were made more competent after a psychotic experience than before.

In the early 1930s insulin coma therapy was trialed to treat schizophrenia, but faded out of use in the 1960s following the advent of antipsychotics. The use of electricity to induce seizures was developed, and in use as electroconvulsive therapy (ECT) by 1938.

Frontal lobotomies, a form of psychosurgery, were carried out from the 1930s until the 1970s in the United States, and until the 1980s in France, involving either the removal of brain tissue from different regions or the severing of pathways, widely recognized as a grave human rights abuse. Stereotactic surgeries were developed in the 1940s.

Antipsychotics were introduced to US hospitals in the 1950s, following the discovery of chlorpromazine in 1952 and its trialing in French hospitals. Adoption was encouraged by advertising by the Smith, Kline & French company after it received permission to advertise use of the drug in 1954. Advertised under the brand name Thorazine, more than 2 million people had received the drug within 8 months. In the first report on chloropromazine's use in the US, John Vernon Kinross-Wright suggested that the drug could be used as an adjunct to psychotherapy to improve its effectiveness.

By the 1960s adverts started to imply that antipsychotics explicitly addressed the causes of psychosis using terms like "psychocorrective." The 1973 text book, "The Companion to Psychiatric Studies" asserted that antipsychotics 'a specific therapeutic effect in schizophrenia, and that the term "tranquiliser" is a misnomer' using the term anti-schizophrenic, discussing the dopamine hypothesis and by 1975 adverts asserted that drugs had an antipsychotic action through acting on dopamine receptors.

== Criticism of mainstream psychiatry ==
=== Anti-psychiatry ===
Anti-psychiatry refers to a diverse collection of thoughts and thinkers that challenge the medical concept of schizophrenia. Anti-psychiatry emphasizes the social context of mental illness and re-frames the diagnosis of schizophrenia as a labeling of deviance. Anti-psychiatry represented dissension of psychiatrists themselves about the understanding of schizophrenia in their own field. Prominent psychiatrists in this movement include R. D. Laing, David Cooper. Related criticisms of psychiatry were launched by philosophers such as Michel Foucault, Jacques Lacan, Gilles Deleuze, Thomas Szasz, and Félix Guattari.

Anti-psychiatrists agree that 'schizophrenia' represents a problem, and that many human beings have problems living in modern society. But they protest the notion that schizophrenia is a disease, and that people who have it are sick. Instead, they often suggest that people with schizophrenia appear crazy because they are intelligent and sensitive beings confronted with a mad world. The sane patient can choose to go against medical advice, but the insane usually cannot. Anti-psychiatry often describes the institutional world as itself pathological and insane because of the way it subordinates human beings to bureaucracy, protocol, and labels.

=== R. D. Laing ===
In his book, The Divided Self, published in 1960, R. D. Laing proposed a psychodynamic model of schizophrenia using the concept of ontological security. He presented a model where schizophrenia is the attempt of the "self", the attention of the mind, to escape the experiences of the world, the "body". The understanding and connection of others, he argued, is felt as either an attack or "smothering understanding" while simultaneously being longed for. Laing posited that in this state the "self" could become angry, hateful, and split and that the strange language of metaphor present in schizophrenia was simultaneously an attempt to avoid being understood, and to be partially understood, or to test a conversation partner. This position was supported by quotations from those diagnosed with schizophrenia. Laing stated that true understanding of the self can resolve schizophrenia.

== Evolution of diagnostic approaches ==
=== Controversies over validity in the 1970s ===
In 1970 psychiatrists Robins and Guze introduced new criteria for deciding on the validity of a diagnostic category and proposed that cases of schizophrenia where people recovered well were not really schizophrenia but a separate condition.

In the early 1970s, the diagnostic criteria for schizophrenia was the subject of a number of controversies which eventually led to the operational criteria used today. It became clear after the 1971 US-UK Diagnostic Study that schizophrenia was diagnosed to a far greater extent in America than in Europe. This was partly due to looser diagnostic criteria in the US, which used the DSM-II manual, contrasting with Europe and its ICD-9. David Rosenhan's 1972 study, published in the journal Science under the title "On being sane in insane places", concluded that the diagnosis of schizophrenia in the US was often subjective and unreliable.

=== DSM-III (1980) and DSM-IV (1994) ===
The 1970s controversies led to the revision not only of the diagnosis of schizophrenia, but the revision of the whole DSM manual, resulting in the publication of the DSM-III in 1980. The revision was based on Feighner Criteria and Research Diagnostic Criteria that had in turn developed from Robins's and Guze's criteria, and which were intended to make diagnosis more reliable (consistent). Since the 1970s more than 40 diagnostic criteria for schizophrenia have been proposed and evaluated.

The DSM-IV of 1994 showed an increased focus on an evidence-based medical model, with the diagnostic criteria for schizophrenia slightly adjusted to require one month of positive symptoms instead of one week.

=== 21st century ===
In 2002 in Japan the name was changed to integration disorder (統合失調症), and in 2012 in South Korea, the name was changed to attunement disorder (조현병,調絃病). In 2014, Taiwan changed the name to thought-perception disorder (思覺失調症). Hong Kong uses the a similar phrase (思覺失調) to refer to psychosis since 2001, keeping the original "split-psyche" name of schizophrenia.

Subtypes of schizophrenia are no longer recognized as separate conditions from schizophrenia by DSM-5 or ICD-11. Before 2013, the subtypes of schizophrenia were classified as paranoid, disorganized, catatonic, undifferentiated, and residual type. The subtypes of schizophrenia were eliminated because of a lack of clear distinction among the subtypes and low validity of classification.

== See also ==
- Montreal experiments
- Physical health in schizophrenia
- The Protest Psychosis: How Schizophrenia Became a Black Disease
- Catastrophic schizophrenia
- Schizophrenia: An Unfinished History
