= Primarily obsessional obsessive–compulsive disorder =

Mental disorder

Primarily obsessional obsessive–compulsive disorder, also known as purely obsessional obsessive–compulsive disorder (Pure O), is a lesser-known form or presentation of OCD. Although it is not a standalone diagnosis in the DSM-5, the International OCD Foundation (IOCDF) recognizes it as a distinct presentation of OCD. For people with primarily obsessional OCD, there are fewer observable compulsions, compared to those commonly seen with the typical form of OCD (checking, counting, hand-washing, etc.). While ritualizing and neutralizing behaviors do take place, they are mostly cognitive in nature, involving mental avoidance and excessive rumination. Primarily obsessional OCD takes the form of intrusive thoughts often of a distressing, sexual, or violent nature (e.g., fear of acting on impulses).

According to the DSM-5, "The obsessive-compulsive and related disorders differ from developmentally normative preoccupations and rituals by being excessive or persisting beyond developmentally appropriate periods. The distinction between the presence of subclinical symptoms and a clinical disorder requires assessment of a number of factors, including the individual's level of distress and impairment in functioning."

== History ==
In the 1960s and 1970s, several psychologists and psychiatrists noted that some OCD patients did not have overt compulsions. In 1971, psychologist Stanley Rachman wrote that obsessions without physical compulsions presented a challenge for behavioral treatment of OCD. He indicated that these obsessions were often associated with "obsessional rumination". Sir Aubrey Lewis similarly argued in 1966 that obsessional ruminations were a subtype of obsessive symptoms, one that entailed mental questioning and search.

Early treatment for pure obsessions involved a thought stopping technique, where patients were instructed to ruminate about their obsession, before the therapist would order them to stop with a vocal command. In some cases, these commands were accompanied by an adversive stimulus. Thought stopping was heavily advocated for by psychologist Joseph Wolpe, but its efficacy was modest at best. A 1989 meta-analysis found that, across several studies, less than half experienced a reduction in obsessions and only around 12% reported improvements in their distress ratings.

== Presentation ==
Primarily obsessional OCD typically presents as rumination without observable compulsions, making it potentially difficult to detect and resulting in unmet needs of this population. It has been called "one of the most distressing and challenging forms of OCD." People with this form of OCD have "distressing and unwanted thoughts pop into [their] head frequently," and the thoughts "typically center on a fear that you may do something totally uncharacteristic of yourself, something... potentially fatal... to yourself or others." The thoughts "quite likely, are of an aggressive or sexual nature."

The nature and type of primarily obsessional OCD vary greatly, but the central theme for all affected is the emergence of a disturbing, intrusive thought or question, an unwanted/inappropriate mental image, or a frightening impulse that causes the person extreme anxiety because it is antithetical to closely held religious beliefs, morals, or societal norms. The fears associated with primarily obsessional OCD tend to be far more personal and terrifying for the affected individual than the fears of someone with traditional OCD. Pure O fears usually focus on self-devastating scenarios that they feel would ruin their life or the lives of those around them. An example of this difference could be that someone with traditional OCD is overly concerned or worried about security or cleanliness, whereas someone with Pure O may be terrified that they have undergone a radical change in their sexuality (e.g., might be or might have changed into a pedophile), that they might be a murderer, or that they might cause any form of harm to a loved one or an innocent person or to themselves, or that they will go insane.

They will understand that these fears are unlikely or even impossible but the anxiety felt will make the obsession seem real and meaningful. While those without primarily obsessional OCD might respond to bizarre, intrusive thoughts or impulses as insignificant and part of a normal variance in the human mind, someone with Pure O will respond with profound alarm followed by an intense attempt to neutralize the thought or avoid having the thought again. The person begins to ask themselves constantly, "Am I really capable of something like that?" or "Could that really happen?" or "Is that really me?" (even though they usually realize that their fear is irrational, which causes them further distress) and puts tremendous effort into escaping or resolving the unwanted thought. They then end up in a vicious cycle of mentally searching for reassurance and trying to get a definitive answer.

Obsessions in Pure O can revolve around any theme, and may pertain to any subtype of OCD. Common intrusive thoughts and mental obsessions include:

- Responsibility: with an excessive concern over someone's well-being marked specifically by guilt over believing they have harmed or might harm someone, either on purpose or inadvertently.
- Sexuality: including recurrent doubt over one's sexual orientation (also called SOCD or "sexual orientation OCD"). People with this theme typically display symptoms different from those of people experiencing an actual crisis in sexuality. One major difference is that people who have a subtype of this SOCD called homosexual OCD or HOCD report being attracted sexually towards the opposite sex prior to the onset of HOCD, while homosexual people whether in the closet or repressed have always had such same-sex attractions. The question "Am I gay?" takes on a pathological form. Many people with this type of obsession are in healthy and fulfilling romantic relationships, either with members of the opposite sex, or the same sex (in which case their fear would be "Am I straight?").
- Pedophilia: sexual themes in OCD can also involve the fear that one is a pedophile. This is typically accompanied by significant distress and fear that one might actually act on pedophilic urges.
- Violence: which involves a constant fear of harming oneself or loved ones.
- Racism: intrusive thoughts or impulses related to racism or race.
- Religiosity: manifesting as intrusive thoughts or impulses revolving around blasphemous and sacrilegious themes (e.g., fear of sinning, fear of choosing the wrong deity, fear of impure thoughts, etc.)
- Health: including consistent fears of having or contracting a disease (different from hypochondriasis) through seemingly impossible means (for example, touching an object that has just been touched by someone with a disease) or mistrust of a diagnostic test.
- Relationship obsessions (ROCD): involve intrusive thoughts and questioning about one's romantic relationship. These may reoccurring include thoughts such as "How do I know this is real love?", "Am I attracted enough to this person?", or "Does my partner truly love me?". These obsessions can also focus on perceived flaws in the partner or fears of infidelity, often accompanied by distress, guilt, and efforts to achieve certainty through mental review or reassurance-seeking. These thoughts are typically unwanted, distressing, and not reflective of the individual's true feelings. They occur involuntarily, contributing to significant anxiety and disruption in daily functioning.
- Existential: involving persistent and obsessive questioning of the nature of self, reality, the universe, and/or other philosophical topics.
- Somatic Function: thinking about basic human functions such as breathing, blinking, or swallowing.

== Diagnosis ==
While Pure O is not a standalone diagnosis in the DSM-5, it does recognize mental compulsions as a legitimate symptom. The DSM-5 acknowledges compulsions can be mental, giving examples of actions like "praying, counting, repeating words silently". The DSM-5 acknowledges that a compulsion can be a physical or mental act done to reduce anxiety.

=== Alternatives ===
Those with primarily obsessional OCD might appear typical and high-functioning, yet spend a great deal of time ruminating, trying to solve or answer any of the questions that cause them distress. Very often, individuals with Pure O are dealing with considerable guilt and anxiety. Ruminations may include trying to think about something 'in the right way' in an attempt to relieve this distress.

For example, an intrusive thought "I could kill Bill with this steak knife" is followed by a catastrophic misinterpretation of the thought, i.e. "How could I have such a thought? Deep down, I must be a psychopath." This might lead a person to continually surf the Internet, reading numerous articles defining psychopathy. This reassurance-seeking ritual will provide no further clarification and could exacerbate the intensity of the search for the answer. There are numerous corresponding cognitive biases present, including thought-action fusion, over-importance of thoughts, and need for control over thoughts.

== Treatment ==
The most effective treatment for primarily obsessional OCD appears to be cognitive-behavioral therapy (more specifically exposure and response prevention (ERP) as well as cognitive therapy (CT)) which may or may not be combined with the use of medication, such as SSRIs. People with OCD without overt compulsions are considered by some researchers to respond less to ERP compared to others with OCD and therefore ERP can prove less successful than CT.

Exposure and Response Prevention for Pure O is theoretically based on the principles of classical conditioning and extinction. The spike (intrusive thought) often presents itself as a paramount question or disastrous scenario followed by a compulsive response of fear, worry, questioning and rumination (e.g., "What if I actually want to harm someone?" or "What if I committed a sin?"). On the other hand, a therapeutic response (one that will help interrupt the cycle of obsessing) is one that answers the spike (intrusive thought) in a way that leaves ambiguity. With a therapeutic response, the subject accepts the possibility and is willing to take the risk, of the feared outcome rather than attempt to (temporarily and repeatedly) reassure oneself that the feared occurrence will not happen."International OCD Foundation Expert Opinion".

For example, the spike/intrusive thought would be, "Maybe I said something offensive to my boss yesterday." A recommended response would be, "Maybe I did. I'll live with the possibility and take the risk he'll fire me tomorrow." Although resisting the need to reassure oneself and perform compulsions will initially cause anxiety to increase, refusing to practice compulsions over an extended period of time will eventually cause anxiety around their intrusive thoughts to decrease, making them less prevalent (e.g. they will begin to occur less often), and less distressing when they do occur. Using this procedure, it is imperative that the distinction be made between the therapeutic response and non-therapeutic response (rumination). The therapeutic response does not seek to answer the question but to accept the uncertainty of the unsolved dilemma.

Acceptance and commitment therapy (ACT) has also been used as a therapy for Pure O, with a 2023 study finding that ACT was particularly effective in reducing OCD symptoms related to intrusive thoughts. Evidence suggests that metacognitive therapy (MCT), another treatment for OCD, effectively reduces Pure O symptoms.

== In society and culture ==
English journalist Bryony Gordon struggled with primarily obsessional OCD. She wrote a book, titled Mad Girl, about her experiences with the disorder.

Singers George Ezra, Christian Lee Hutson, Luke Combs, and PinkPantheress suffer from primarily obsessional OCD. Hutson stated that he wrote the song "OCDemon" as a therapeutic exercise.

The 2019 series Pure depicts its protagonist, 24-year-old Marnie, struggling with primarily obsessional obsessive-compulsive disorder. According to The Guardian, sufferers of Pure O generally praised the show's relatability but felt that Marnie's condition was not treated with the appropriate level of gravity.

The protagonist of Glyn Dillon's 2012 graphic novel The Nao of Brown suffers from primarily obsessional OCD.

== Bibliography ==
- The Imp of the Mind: Exploring the Silent Epidemic of Obsessive Bad Thoughts by Lee Baer, Ph.D.
- The Treatment of Obsessions (Medicine) by Stanley Rachman. Oxford University Press, 2003.
- Brain lock: Free yourself from obsessive-compulsive behavior: A four-step self-treatment method to change your brain chemistry by Jeffrey Schwartz and Beverly Beyette. New York: Regan Books, 1997. ISBN 0-06-098711-1.
- The OCD Workbook by Bruce Hyman and Cherry Pedrick.
- Overcoming obsessive thoughts. How to gain control of your OCD by David A. Clark, Ph.D. and Christine Purdon, Ph.D.
- Mad Girl by Bryony Gordon. London: Headline, 2016. ISBN 1472232089.
