= Social aspects of jealousy =

Sociology of jealousy

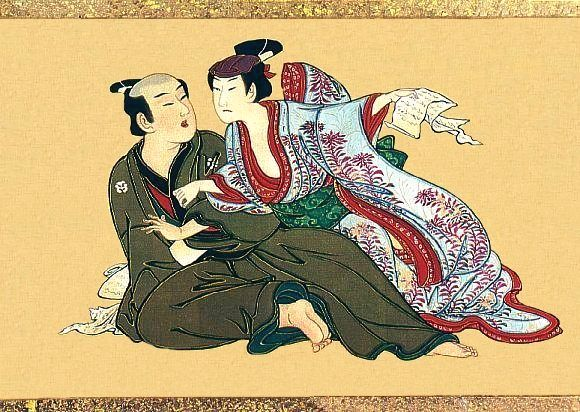
Love letter from a rival. A youth catches his boyfriend with a love letter from another. Miyagawa Isshō, ca. 1750; Panel from a series of ten homoerotic scenes, on a shunga-style painted hand scroll (kakemono-e); sumi, color and gofun on silk. Private collection.

The sociology of jealousy deals with cultural and social factors that influence what causes jealousy, how jealousy is expressed, and how attitudes toward jealousy change over time.

Anthropologists such as Margaret Mead have shown that jealousy varies across cultures. Cultural learning can influence the situations that trigger jealousy and the manner in which jealousy is expressed. Attitudes toward jealousy can also change within a culture over time. For example, attitudes toward jealousy changed substantially during the 1960s and 1970s in the United States. People in the United States adopted much more negative views about jealousy.

== Causes of jealousy ==
Margaret Mead reports a number of societies in which a man would offer his wife or daughter to others for sexual purposes, as well as cases in which "first wives" in polygamous societies would welcome additional wives as enhancing their prestige and lightening their work. She contrasts the Dobuans, whose lives were dominated by jealous guardianship of everything from wives to yams, with the Samoans, among whom jealousy was rare.

It is possible that Mead's attribution of these differences to social arrangements is correct. Stearns similarly notes that the social history of jealousy among Americans shows a near absence of jealousy in the eighteenth century, when marriages were arranged by parents and close community supervision all but precluded extramarital affairs. As these social arrangements were gradually supplanted by the practice of dating several potential partners before marriage and by more fluid and anonymous living arrangements, jealousy as a social phenomenon correspondingly increased.

Others have questioned Mead's findings about Samoa. Jealousy occurred far more frequently than Mead suggested and often resulted in violence. The Samoans have a word for such violence: fua. It may be that no society has the freedom from jealousy which Mead attributed to the Samoans. The incidence of jealousy may vary across cultures, but jealousy remains a cultural universal nonetheless.

== Changes in attitudes ==
By the late 1960s and the 1970s, jealousy — particularly sexual jealousy — had come to be seen as both irrational and shameful in some quarters, particularly among advocates of free love. Advocates and practitioners of non-exclusive sexual relationships, believing that they ought not to be jealous, sought to banish or deny jealous reactions to their partners' sexual involvement with others. Many found this unexpectedly difficult, though for others, conscious blocking of the jealous reaction is relatively easy from the start, and over time the reaction can be effectively extinguished. Some studies suggest that jealousy may be reduced in multilateral relationships where there is a clear hierarchy of relationships or where expectations are otherwise fixed. (See Smith and Smith, Beyond Monogamy.) Contemporary practitioners of what is now called polyamory (multiple intimate relationships) for the most part treat jealousy as an inevitable problem, best handled by accommodation and communication. In mainstream society, although jealousy still carries connotations of insecurity, there is a greater tendency to accept it as a normal and expected reaction to a relationship threat.

== See also ==
- Jealousy in art
- Jealousy in religion
- Emotion
- Attachment in adults
- Monogamy
- Open marriage
- Penis envy
