= TAF =

Taf may refer to:

- River Taf, in South Wales, UK
- Tav/Taf/Taph/Taw, the final letter of many Semitic alphabets
- Modern Greek pronunciation of the letter Tau

== Acronym ==
The acronym TAF may refer to:

=== Film and television ===
- The American Friend, 1977 film
- Thomas & Friends (titled Thomas the Tank Engine & Friends prior to 2003), a British television series based on The Railway Series of books by the Reverend Wilbert Awdry and his son, Christopher Awdry.

=== Medicine and related fields ===
- TBP-associated factors, a term used in genetics
- Thought-action fusion, a term from psychology and psychiatry
- Tenofovir alafenamide fumarate, a drug use in the treatment of HIV infection
- Trim and Fit, a former school anti-obesity program in Singapore

=== Military organisations ===
- Tactical air force, a formation of the air forces of the British Commonwealth during and after World War II:
  - Australian First Tactical Air Force - South West Pacific Area
  - Desert Air Force (later known as the First Tactical Air Force) - North Africa and later Italy
  - RAF Second Tactical Air Force - Northern Europe
  - RAF Third Tactical Air Force - South Asia
  - Northwest African Tactical Air Force
- Territorial Air Force, the reserve Air Force of New Zealand
- Tunisian Armed Forces
  - Tunisian Air Force
- Turkish Armed Forces
  - Turkish Air Force

=== Non-military organisations ===
- TAF Linhas Aéreas, a former Brazilian airline
- Taiwan Accreditation Foundation, an organization in Taipei, Taiwan
- Taiwanese American Foundation, an organization working in the Taiwanese immigrant community of the US
- The Asia Foundation, a non-profit organization operating in Asia
- The Athlete's Foot, a retail supplier of shoes and other sports apparel
- Tiger Athletic Foundation, private, non-profit corporation supporting Louisiana State University and its athletics program
- Trade Association Forum, an umbrella group for trade organisations in the UK
- Turkish Athletic Federation, the governing body for the sport of athletics in Turkey

=== Other uses ===
- Telecom Animation Film, an animation studio in Japan
- Term Auction Facility, an instrument of monetary policy introduced in US financial markets
- Terminal aerodrome forecast, format for reporting weather forecast information in aviation
- Test automation framework, in computer software testing
- Thousand acre-feet, a unit of volume
- Tokyo International Anime Fair, an anime trade fair held annually in Japan
- Treno ad alta frequentazione, an Italian railway vehicle
