= Scrupulosity =

Psychological disorder of morality

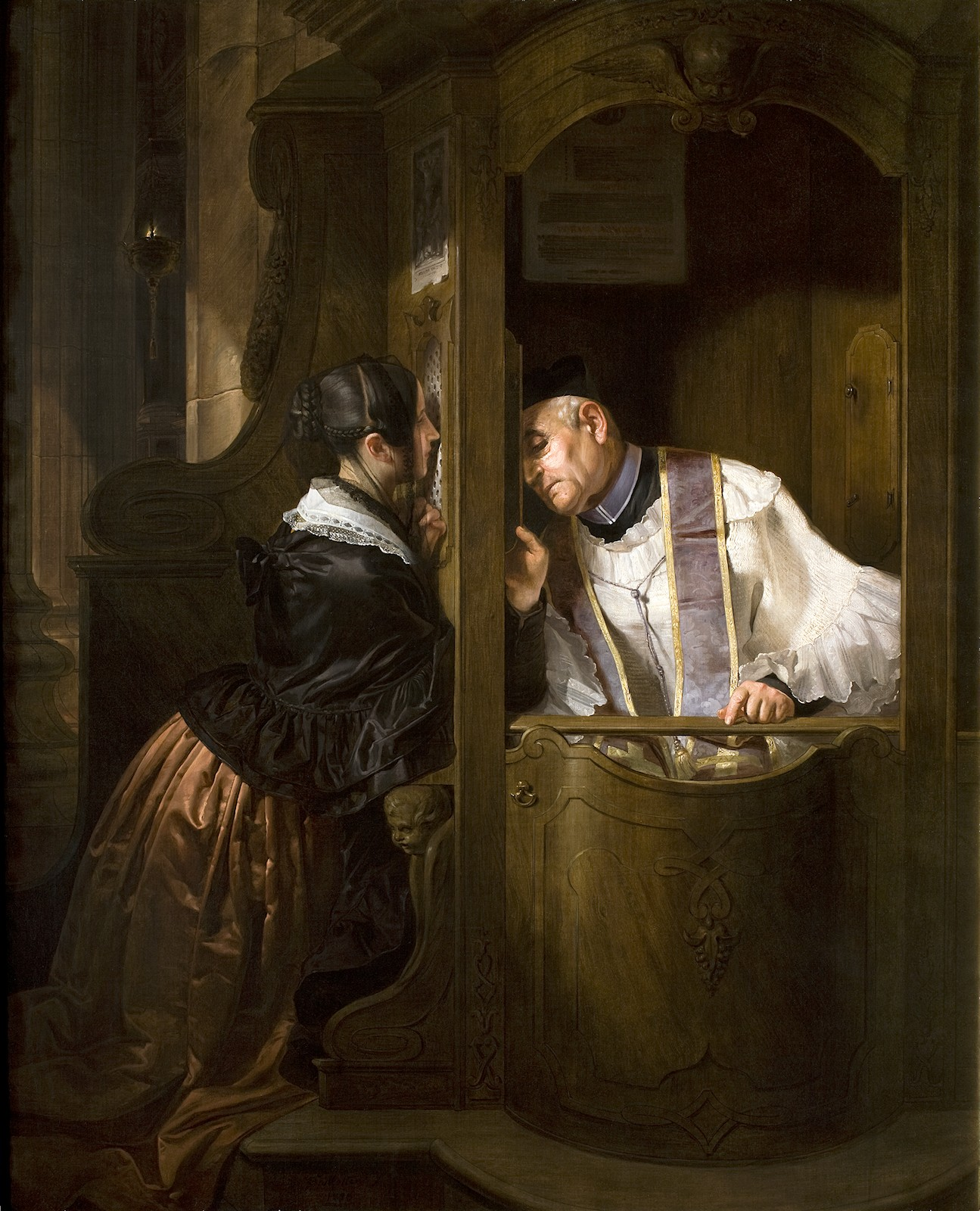
Those with scrupulosity struggle with intense feelings of guilt, sometimes leading to excessive participation in religious rites such as confession. (The Confession by Giuseppe Molteni, 1838)

Scrupulosity, also known as religious obsessive–compulsive disorder or scrupulous–compulsive disorder (SCD), is a mental disorder defined by intrusive thoughts about moral or religious ideas, pathological feelings of guilt, and compulsions which attempt to mitigate such thoughts. It is widely understood as a subtype of obsessive–compulsive disorder (OCD).

Common obsessions include fears about having blasphemous thoughts, unwittingly committing immoral actions, being condemned to hell, or improperly performing religious obligations. Compulsions often take the form of excessive prayers, obsessive study of religious doctrine, or avoidance of religious obligations and objects. Individuals with scrupulosity often exhibit paralyzing doubt about whether they fully understand their moral principles, leading to rumination. They often have difficulty acknowledging that their thoughts and behaviors are irrationally motivated and may have difficulty interpreting exaggerated language in religious contexts.

Scrupulosity is generally treated with psychotherapy; cognitive behavioral therapy (CBT) and exposure and response prevention (ERP) are both common approaches in treatment. Psychopharmacological treatments, such as selective serotonin reuptake inhibitors (SSRIs), may be prescribed to those with OCD if symptoms are severe enough, though effectiveness with scrupulosity appears to be lower. Clinicians often collaborate with appropriate clergy to help bolster patient trust in the process, fortify the patient's understanding that their thoughts are disordered, and prepare clergy to support treatment in ecclesiastical settings. Clergy also help clinicians disentangle normative religious practices from disordered ones.

Prognosis for scrupulosity is generally worse than other forms of obsessive–compulsive spectrum disorders, being more resistant to treatment overall. The mental energy cost of obsessions and compulsions can lead to increased comorbidity, especially depressive and other anxiety disorders. People with scrupulosity are at a higher risk of depression, low self-esteem, self-harm, and suicide.

== Etymology ==
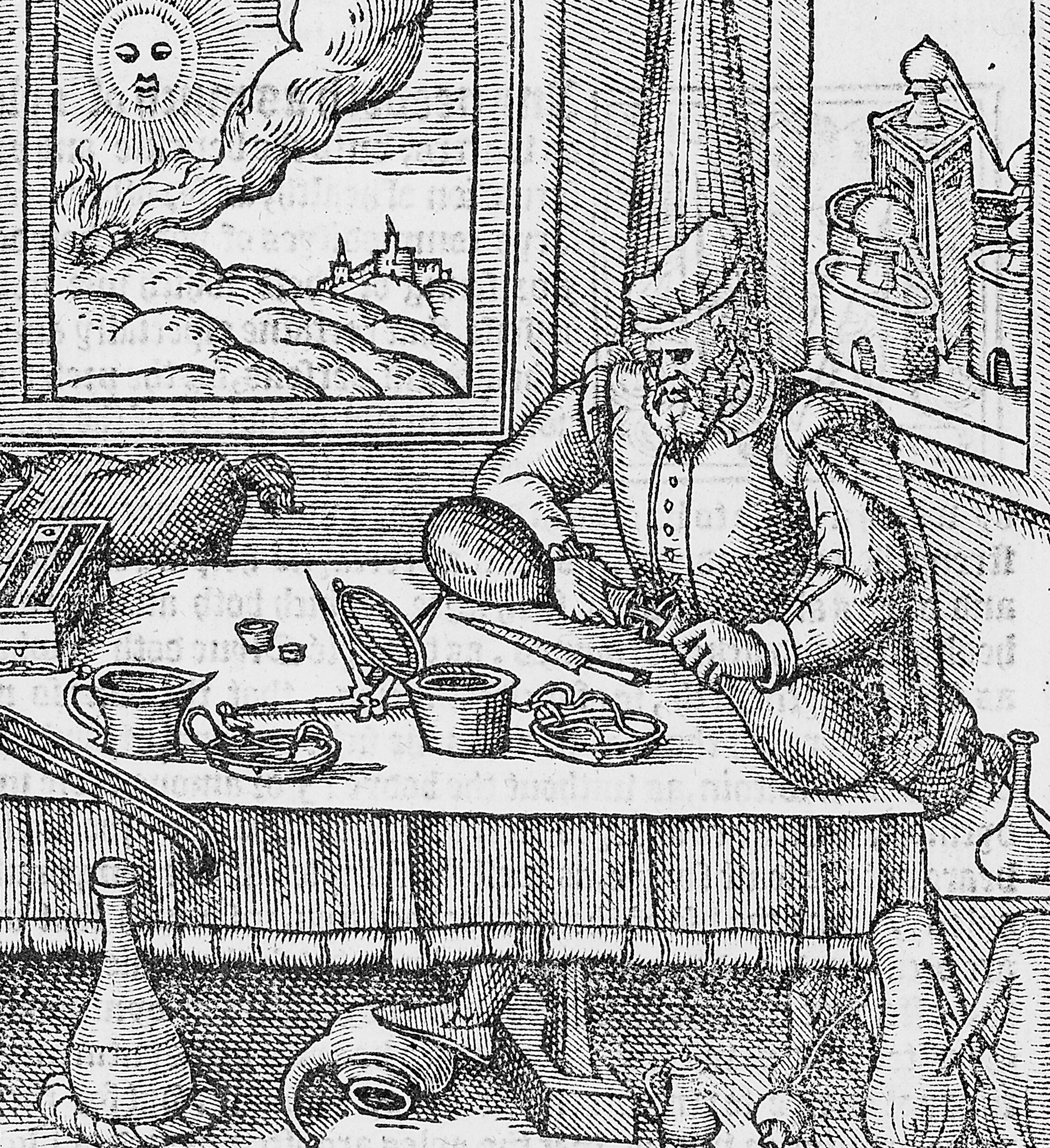
The meaning of scrupulosity in its modern sense can be partially traced back to the jargon of medieval apothecaries.

The word scrupulosity is derived from the word scruple. The latter is derived from the Latin term scrupulum ('small rock, pebble'), such as the kind of small rock that one would get in their shoe while walking which later carried a sense of mental uneasiness. A later semantic shift in the jargon used by apothecaries led to scruple meaning 'one twenty-fourth of an ounce', a measure which would only be noticed on extremely sensitive scales. This sense developed in parallel in vernacular English to mean an inconsequential moral interpretation which could only bother an overly-sensitive mind.

== Classification ==
Traditionally, scrupulosity has been treated as a subtype of obsessive–compulsive disorder (OCD) and such categorization remains the majority opinion. Under a four-prong model of OCD, it is categorized as a subtype manifesting as obsessions of unacceptable thoughts which seek out reassurance-based compulsions. In a five-prong model based on factor analysis, it belongs to a category of "religious, sexual, and aggressive obsessions" with no explicit compulsion model. Certain obsessions, such as beliefs that one may not have appropriately followed religious obligations or those regarding one's damnation, may also be considered a part of the "harm to self or others" category.

Some clinicians have pushed for scrupulosity to have a distinct diagnosis from OCD since at least the early 1990s. According to this view, patients with scrupulosity exhibit similar symptoms to those of OCD, but typically have "poorer insight, higher fixity of belief, greater perceptual aberration, and more severe magical ideation". The obsessive thoughts of those with scrupulosity differ from diagnostic guidance as the obsessions are about pertinent real-life problems. Similarly, compulsions found in OCD are typically irrational and intended to minimize anxiety, whereas many compulsive behaviors associated with scrupulosity are similarly excessive but logically informed and intended to resolve the issue once and for all.

Critics of this view argue that functional evidence clearly demonstrates overwhelming similarity with OCD, even if there are some noteworthy topographical differences. Other kinds of OCD which manifest as unacceptable thoughts show nearly identical neutralization strategies and follow similar cyclical patterns. Co-occurrence with other forms of OCD, especially with obsessions about sex and violence, is also a common argument for categorizing scrupulosity as a form of OCD. Similarly, obsessions are known to shift thematically over the course of a patient's lifetime; it is not uncommon, for example, for a person to have scrupulosity obsessions in childhood, but another kind of "unacceptable thoughts" category as an adult.

== Signs and symptoms ==
Scrupulosity is a psychological disorder in which an individual experiences distressing and maladaptive obsessions regarding moral or religious issues and performs compulsive behaviors which attempt to mitigate the distress caused by such obsessions. Those with scrupulosity exhibit multiple dysfunctional lines of thought, including placing undue emphasis on the role of their thoughts, an excessive need for control, a heightened sense of responsibility, and an impaired ability to estimate threats. Though mostly associated with religion, scrupulosity has been found in irreligious people where it manifests as fears of being immoral or bad.

The disorder is marked by two primary archetypes: obsessions of wrongdoing with compulsions seeking reassurance and obsessions of punishment with compulsions of avoidance and of repentance. In most individuals, some combination of both archetypes are present. Coreligionists, including clergy, often view the behaviors that cause these obsessions or avoidances as guiltless, easily pardonable, or otherwise unimportant, but they cause significant distress in patients. The vast majority of those with scrupulosity feel that their symptoms interfere with their relationship with God.

Like other forms of OCD, scrupulosity is extremely idiosyncratic and heterogeneous, meaning that manifestations vary widely from person to person and may be derived from a variety of etiologies, or origins. For example, religious icons may be sought out by one individual with scrupulosity for comfort and avoided by another for fear of triggering religious obsessions.

=== Obsessions ===
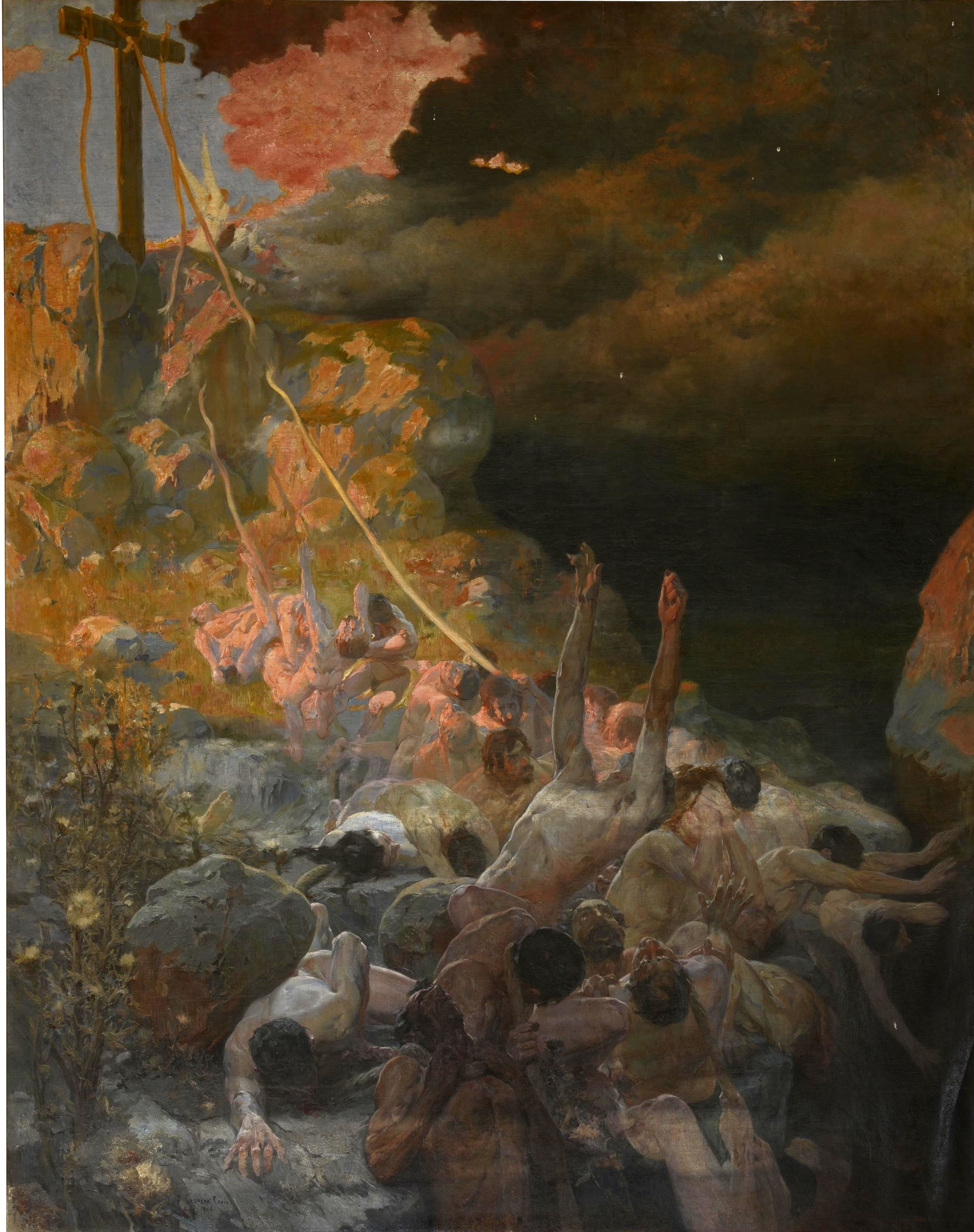
Many people with scrupulosity experience obsessions about being condemned to hell.

Individuals with scrupulosity have "a habitual state of mind" in which dysfunctional moral or religious thought patterns pervade, and feelings of guilt and personal responsibility are disproportionately amplified. These religious obsessions are sometimes known as scruples. Being irrationally fearful of sinning, they believe their own licit behavior is sinful or that their sinful behavior is more transgressive than it really is. Intrusive thoughts about committing blasphemy, sexual immorality, and other immoral actions in the past or the future are commonly reported, as are thoughts that a religious duty has been performed improperly or that the individual will be divinely punished. Other common themes include that one is unwittingly committing a sin, feelings that one may lose control and become immoral, doubts about faith, fears that one's worship will not be accepted by God, and fears of going to hell. Patients often feel that they are improperly penitent or that they are uncertain if their intrusive thoughts are wanted or not. They exhibit more negative ideas about God, envisioning the deity as "punishing, fearsome, jealous, terrifying, angry, [and] vengeful", which scales with disorder severity. The manifestation of obsessions varies based on religion and cultural context. Obsessions generally fall into four categories, which often overlap:

1. Blasphemous intrusive thoughts (egodystonic; e.g., a Christian with intrusive thoughts of Jesus on the Cross with an erection)
2. Concerns about orthodoxy (egosyntonic; e.g., a Catholic who cannot reconcile his intellectual thoughts about abortion with his religious conviction and repeatedly asks his priest if he is still in good standing with the Church)
3. General intrusive thoughts viewed through a religious lens (generally egodystonic, typically resolved with religious-themed compulsions; e.g., a man who has incestuous intrusive thoughts about his sister, blames the Devil, and prays excessively)
4. Doubts about faithfulness or whether religious obligations have been appropriately followed (e.g., a Mormon woman who worries that by wiping after using the restroom, she is masturbating and thus is failing to appropriately follow her religious code)

Ironically, these obsessions are so rigid, narrow, and excessive that they often cause the person neglect more important aspects of their faith. In an example case, a woman was so preoccupied with her fear of having blasphemous intrusive thoughts during a religious service that she avoided them altogether. Overall, patients with scrupulosity exhibit more obsessive thoughts than other patients with OCD.

Scrupulosity is associated with moral thought-action fusion, a disordered pattern of thought that equates thoughts with actions, irrespective of if the thoughts are wanted or not. For example, an intrusive thought about having illicit sexual intercourse may compel a person with scrupulosity to bring the thought to confession – sometimes repeatedly – as if they had actually committed the sexual act, even though the thought was not willingly generated by the individual and the individual never physically engaged in such an act. Religious prohibitions against certain kinds of want may promote the occurrence of thought-action fusion in people with scrupulosity, such as the Tenth Commandment which prohibits coveting and Jesus's admonishment in the Sermon on the Mount that a man who looks at a woman in lust has already committed adultery in his heart. Thought-action fusion is more common in Christian patients than patients of other religions.

=== Intolerance of uncertainty ===
Intrusive thoughts, including those about religious topics, are not themselves disordered; healthy individuals will intermittently experience abrasive intrusive thoughts, acknowledge them as absurd, and discard them. Scrupulosity does not manifest in most religious people because they recognize that thoughts must either be willfully generated or indulged by a conscious mind to be sinful. The thought-action fusion experienced by those with scrupulosity makes differentiating difficult and, even when a patient recognizes that a thought may not be sinful, they are unable to convince themselves that it certainly is not sinful.

This disparity between the ability to accept concepts based on faith or inference is known as intolerance of uncertainty. While attested in other mental disorders, it is considered most prominent in patients with OCD, particularly in the "unacceptable thoughts" subtype of which scrupulosity is usually considered a part. As a result of such intolerance, individuals with scrupulosity feel that it is both possible and necessary to ascertain with perfect certainty the solutions to their obsessions and become greatly distressed when they discover no such certainty can exist. In combination with other symptoms, this intolerance leads patients to "practice their own religion" by developing rigid and often heterodox negative beliefs about God, leading to emotional distress.

=== Excessive doubt ===
Patients exhibit "periods of unusual and disabling confusion or doubt" surrounding their understanding of moral principles and whether an action has violated such principles. These are often triggered by experiencing a minor moral dilemma or in situations that remind them of other periods of doubt, leading to a concatenating series of thoughts that impairs rational thinking. These feelings of doubt often lead to periods of rumination, where – in an attempt to rationally resolve the anxious feeling – an individual may meticulously interrogate perceived past moral failings and obsessively meditate on philosophical or theological analyses. The centrality of this symptom has led to the disorder's nickname as the "doubting disease". (Note: Historically, the term doubting disease has also applied to OCD overall.)

=== Cognitive distortion and overburdening ===
In general, people with scrupulosity have poor insight, meaning that they cannot fully acknowledge that their behavior is irrationally motivated. Patients have difficulty interpreting normal moral frameworks and may associate unrelated actions with moral behaviors based on gut feelings. This poor awareness may be associated with an overload in mental energy expense, causing a lack of clear mental imagery which disallows for ready interpretation. This in turn leads to an inability to process a large influx of thoughts and leads to chronic worrying. Magical thinking is also more prominent among individuals with scrupulosity than other forms of OCD.

Patients also interpret moral precepts with exceptional severity, even when religious language is intentionally exaggerated for effect. The misalignment of intent and interpretation by the patient leads to further disorientation. In other cases, individuals with scrupulosity may ascribe moral value to actions contrary to normative beliefs; in other words, an individual might ascribe an action typically regarded as moral by coreligionists as immoral or an immoral action as moral. Similarly, they may describe their own action in some instance as immoral, but identical behavior by another in identical circumstances as morally acceptable.

While virtually no religion requires perfection from their adherents, people with scrupulosity feel an excessive need for perfectionism, including outside their religious symptoms. Individuals often experience life through an additional mental "filter" which inserts moral interpretation into otherwise innocuous settings, causing the person to expend so much mental energy that relaxation and even other cognitive functions are impacted severely. This erosion of mental energy is associated with increased comorbidity with other anxiety and depressive disorders.

=== Compulsions ===
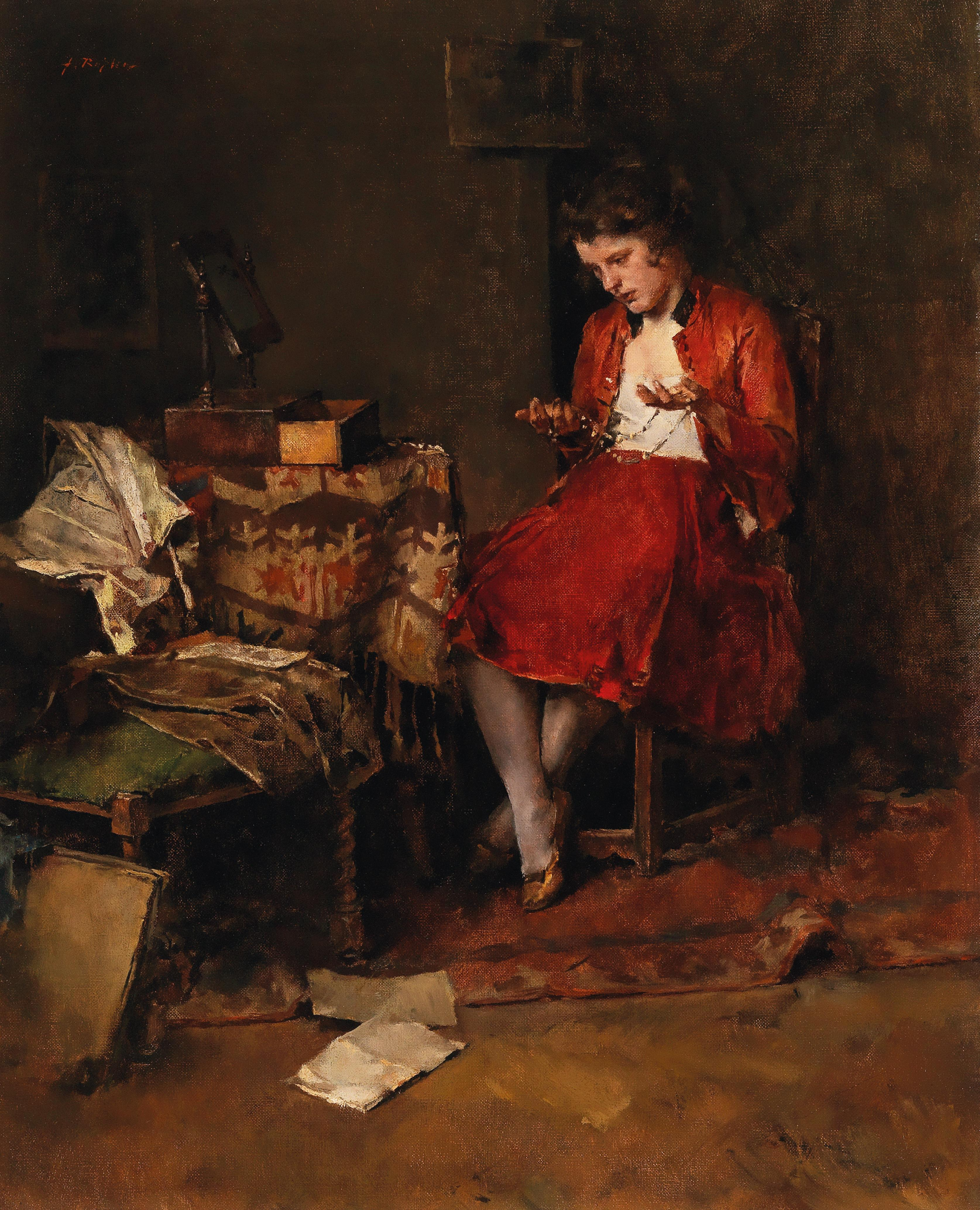
Excessive praying is a common compulsion performed by those with scrupulosity.

To mitigate the associated feelings of guilt and anxiety, individuals compulsively engage in excessive and ritualistic religious behaviors. These may include persistent praying, reading and rereading of religious texts, visits to confession, reassurance seeking, thought suppression, or apologizing. Instruction or absolution provided by religious leaders may create temporary relief before obsessions creep back in, but severe cases may be nearly unaffected. Family members and friends may also attempt to help by accommodating the symptoms of the disorder, such as providing reassurance, giving doctrinal interpretations, assisting in prayer, or providing cover for avoidant behaviors. These provisions, however, are considered to hinder improved outcomes in patients, as it prevents the patient from developing an understanding that the obsessions are unfounded in reality; higher levels of familial accommodation are linked to more severe symptoms in OCD patients.

Individuals with scrupulosity may sometimes avoid places and contexts they believe will begin a cycle of doubt. They may also postpone attending religious services or worshiping, or may avoid them altogether. Certain religious texts may also be avoided. Avoidance behaviors may extend to other facets of life. For example, an individual with scrupulosity may feel they may do or say something immoral in company and thereby avoid social gatherings.

These compulsive behaviors reinforce the individual's obsessions, creating a cycle. Counterintuitively, both avoidance and compulsive behaviors – including thought suppression and distraction – increase obsession frequency, leading to obsessional preoccupation. It is thought that the behaviors serve as retrieval cues for the obsessive thoughts that led to the behaviors. These amplify feelings of doubt, which in turn increase the need for neutralizing behaviors. For example, a person anxiously uncertain if they are going to hell may obsessively seek out interpretations of their faith's infernological doctrine to alleviate fears, the complexity of which only deepens feelings of doubt.

Relationships to other kinds of compulsions are not unknown either. In a study among Western Christian OCD patients, those with high religiosity exhibited higher levels of handwashing than other patients and placed increased emphasis on getting hold of one's thoughts, which the researchers related to the Sermon on the Mount and similar passages in the Bible which equate thought with action. By contrast, handwashing among Jewish and Muslim patients is readily identifiable with ritual washing associated with prayer and other customs, both in Judaism and in Islam.

=== Rationalization processes ===
The rationalizing sources of scrupulosity appear to be two mutually-reinforcing processes: judgement-driven anxiety and anxiety-driven judgements. The first begins with a moral judgement about the world, which is made more severe by the patient's heightened overall anxiety. Natural anxiety provides a person focus to understand important tasks and prepare to take them on; a person may have anxiety about a test and is thereby compelled to prepare for it. By contrast, an individual with scrupulosity may derive anxiety from a lack of perfection. If they fail to reach that perfection, this will only reinforce the anxious feelings.

In anxiety-driven judgements, an individual with scrupulosity develops feelings of anxiety and searches for a value judgement to apply to the anxiety in an attempt to rationalize it. For example, a woman with scrupulosity may walk through a friend's yard, be struck with a feeling of anxiousness, and realize her shoes are covered in grass; she attributes her anxiety in the preceding moment to a feeling that she is somehow "stealing" the grass, thereby applying a moral judgement to the preexisting, unrelated anxiety.

These reinforcements narrow the scope of attention, decrease the response to reassurance, and block responsiveness to counterevidence. Both drivers then reinforce each other: the anxiety causes an individual to form a judgement, that judgement is fortified by anxiety when it comes about next, and the anxiety appears to confirm to the individual that the judgement was appropriately made. Instead of seeking out real moral judgements, patients primarily seek out anxiety-lessening behaviors at the cost of seeking out real moral answers, even if the individual in question has an earnest want to behave morally.

== Neuropsychology ==
OCD appears to be measurably biological. The brains of OCD patients demonstrate changes in activity in the frontal-subcortical circuits. Activity is lower in the anterior thalamus and the basal ganglia, particularly the caudate nucleus and globus pallidus, while the orbital cortices and the cingulate gyrus appear to have higher activity. In combination, these lead to "poor information transmission and decreased ability to filter insignificant sensory data [...], problems with integrating thoughts and emotions, difficulty in shifting attention from one piece of information to another, and excess threat signalling in the case of failed attempts to avoid imaginary threats".

Similarly, several studies of OCD manifesting through unacceptable thoughts and through checking compulsions show lower levels of gray matter in the temporal lobes, amygdala, insular cortex, and putamen, as well as both the left orbitofrontal cortex and the right cerebellum. Higher levels of activity in the hippocampus are reported when symptoms are provoked and in reward-based spatial learning environments, whereas higher activity is found in the striatum during tasks that require continuous interaction or conflict processing. The anterior cingulate cortex, amygdala, and premotor cortex showed marked increases in activity when seeing fearful faces during an emotional face-matching task. Higher activity is similarly reported in the paralimbic cortex, ventrolateral prefrontal cortex, and right amygdala during moral dilemma tasks, which correlates positively with symptom severity. Patients with sexual and religious obsessions in particular show higher levels of neural connection between the ventral striatum, right inferior frontal gyrus, insula, and left superior temporal gyrus. The higher activation of the amygdala is associated with a stronger moral disgust response and feelings of shame.

== Causes ==
What causes scrupulosity as opposed to other manifestations of OCD is uncertain. Terror management theory (TMT) views religion as having a coping role for the inevitability of death; under this framework, scrupulosity emerges as an dysfunctional form. Individuals with scrupulosity may feel that God is present and in control, but that they are totally severed from the divine connection, impairing their ability to cope with the finality of death. Another suggestion is that scrupulosity acts as a way of seeking out security in domains where one is unable to facilitate confirmation of success, as one is with the confirmation that sins have been wiped away or that one's relationship with God is positive. Intolerance of uncertainty, a typical symptom of OCD, may distinguish typical expressions of religiosity from dysfunctional scrupulosity. While religiosity is not correlated with the development of scrupulosity, childhood trauma and "maladaptive guilt induction strategies used by parents" are.

== Diagnosis ==
Like other forms of OCD, traditional OCD diagnostic tools – including the Yale–Brown Obsessive–Compulsive Scale (Y-BOCS) and the Beck Anxiety Inventory – are often employed and combined with a clinician's observations of religious qualities in obsessions and compulsions. Y-BOCS has been criticized in its use for scrupulosity patients since it only asks one question about religious fears. Because of this, clinicians may ask probing questions about religious manifestations of typical OCD symptoms, such as whether they have blasphemous intrusive thoughts or whether they worry excessively about divine punishment. Specific questions pertinent to the specific religion of the patient may also facilitate diagnosis.

As of 2024, there are four tools which measure scrupulosity without measuring other OCD symptoms: the Penn Inventory of Scrupulosity (PIOS), (Note: Pronounced /paɪəs/ PY-əs, as in pious.) the revised Penn Inventory of Scrupulosity (PIOS-R), the Scrupulous Thoughts and Behaviors Questionnaire (STBQ), and the Scrupulosity Inventory (SI). The PIOS-R uses a series of nineteen statements – such as "I worry about heaven and hell", "I worry that God is upset with me", and "Immoral thoughts come into my head and I cannot get rid of them" – and asks patients to rate the frequency they experience such thoughts on a scale of zero (never) to four (constantly). The PIOS and the PIOS-R are the most-widely used of these scales, though the PIOS has been criticized as ineffective at identifying scrupulosity in non-Christians.

Scrupulosity is often misdiagnosed since it can sometimes be difficult to tell when an action passes from normative religious practice into scrupulosity. The two may be differentiated from other normative religious rituals and avoidance in asking several questions:

1. Is the behavior more extreme than the patient's peers interpret the religious obligation?
2. Is the behavior excessively narrow or trivial?
3. Is the behavior impairing typical religious, family, and career functions?
4. Is the behavior excessively distressing to the patient or limit the patient's ability to practice their religion?

Given the likelihood of religious OCD patients to have scrupulous symptoms and the general paucity of insight in scrupulosity cases, it is recommended that such patients be screened for scrupulosity.

== Treatment ==
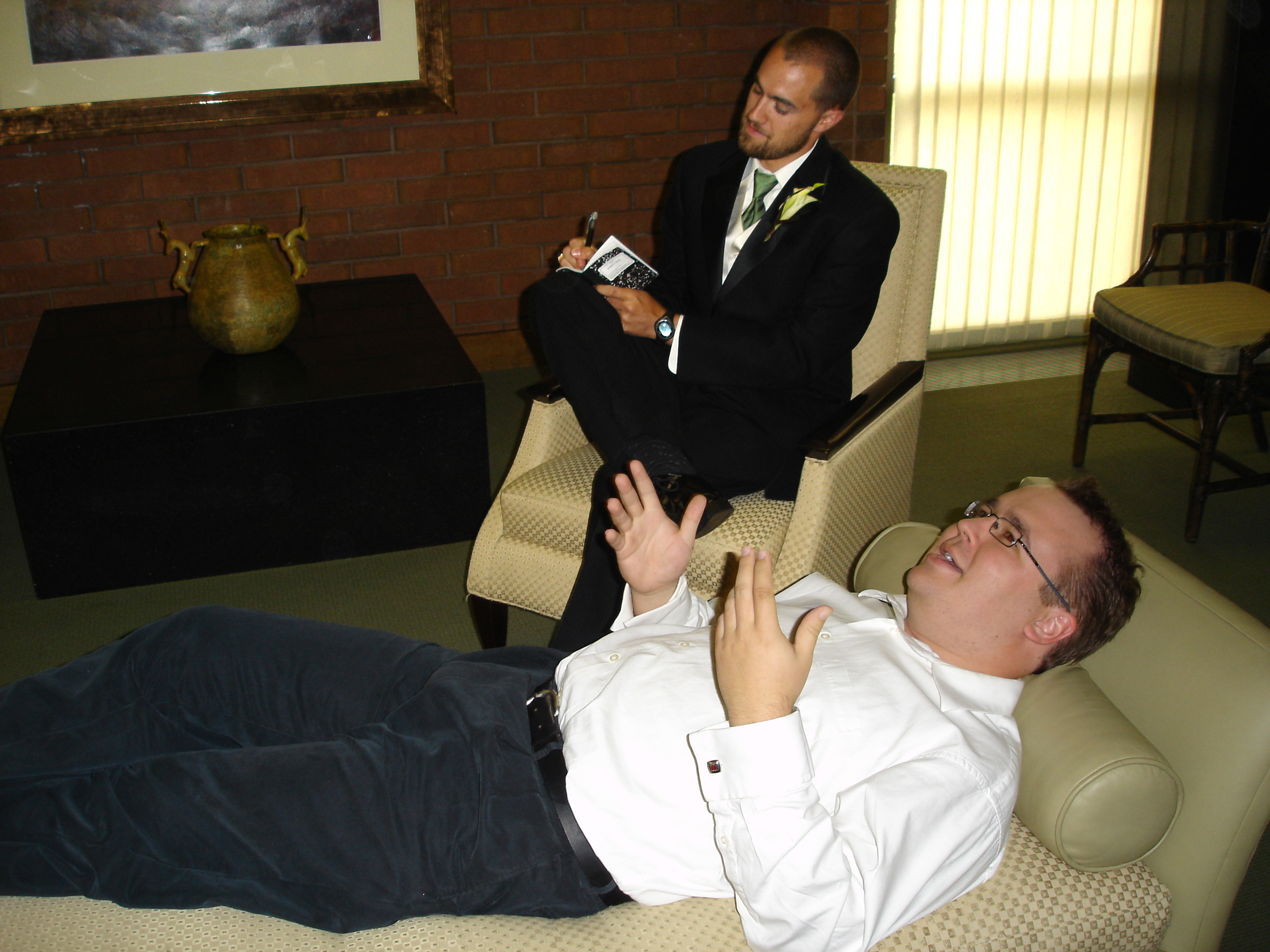
Psychotherapy is a common treatment for scrupulosity patients.

Treatment of scrupulosity includes both psychotherapeutic and psychopharmacological approaches. Psychotherapy aims to confront the individual's irrational beliefs, fortify their ability to deal with uncertainty, and manage their compulsions. Selective serotonin reuptake inhibitors (SSRIs) are generally used as a pharmacological treatment for OCD when symptoms are severe enough, though response in patients with scrupulosity appears to be lower than other OCD patients. Treatment overall, however, remains understudied.

Cognitive behavioral therapy (CBT) and exposure and response prevention (ERP) both have demonstrated success treating OCD, but have had more limited success in patients with scrupulosity. In particular, standard forms of ERP have had limited success based on perceptions that even mere exposure would be morally transgressive and moral fears are difficult to falsify. Moreover, CBT's approach focuses on removing meaningfulness from intrusive thoughts, which is sometimes seen as incompatible with legitimate beliefs that thoughts have moral value. Difficulty in proving certain disordered thoughts is also a challenge, as a patient cannot be definitively convinced that they are not condemned to hell, for instance, while others may believe that ERP is contrary to their religious obligations. Patients may also have low trust of psychological care and often prefer treatment in religious settings. Still, CBT in conjunction with ERP remains popular and demonstrates substantive efficacy in treating scupulosity.

While CBT therapy is generally considered for treating most kinds of OCD, including scrupulosity, in children and adolescents, special care must be taken to avoid "thought challenging", which is often used by minors as a compulsion to combat intrusive thoughts. Care must also be taken in CBT when externalizing scrupulosity, as patients may not accept that their issues are necessarily disordered or distinct from normative expectations religious suffering. Clinicians are often cautioned against engaging patients in theological debate, as patients are often obsessively engaged in scriptural or dogmatic study and may be more informed than the clinician in these domains.

Aside from standard CBT and ERP, acceptance and commitment therapy (ACT) and other adapted CBT models have been used to treat scrupulosity, though CBT remains the most common. ERP remains highly regarded, however, with some proponents citing studies which demonstrate better outcomes and patient reports of lasting effects after sessions have terminated.

=== Collaboration with clergy ===
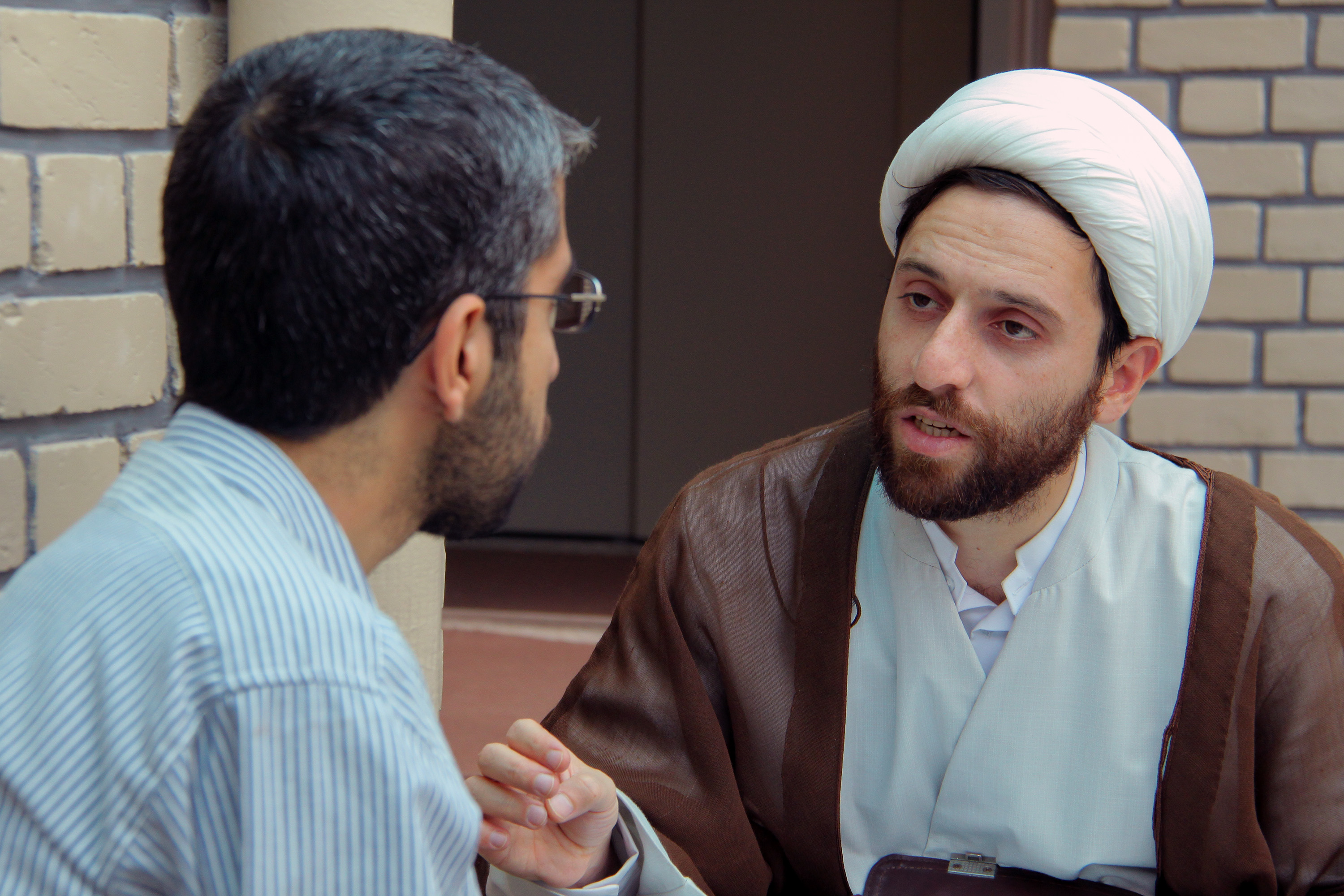
Clergy and clinicians often collaborate to improve outcomes for patients.

While variations of ERP exist, they may be at odds with ecclesiastical instructions given to patients. As a result, in order to best facilitate positive outcomes, clinicians must distinguish legitimate religious practice from disordered compulsion, which often requires collaboration with relevant clergy. Patients may drop out of therapy entirely if they believe the disorder is not being accurately differentiated from devotion. In some instances, clinicians may feel that religion is playing a harmful role, but this view is now discouraged. Instead, clinicians are advised to acclimatize themselves to the patient's religious sensitivities to develop rapport with patients and clergy to better differentiate normative religious activities from disordered behaviors. In other cases, the clinician may simply be unfamiliar with the patient's religion and require guidance.

The integration of clergy into therapeutic efforts can fortify a patient's understanding that their condition is disordered. It is discouraged to request clergy provide dispensation for certain religious obligations, even in cases where a patient may accept it, because it provides reassurance that a patient may be unhealthily seeking out and may be an outlet for avoidance behaviors. In other cases, it may cause patients feelings of inferiority in relation to people of the same faith.

While data is limited, studies show that many clergymen understand scrupulosity as distinct from spirituality, while recognizing that it is not something they are equipped to deal with personally. Less recognizant clergy, however, may unwittingly provide advice that is contrary to accepted clinical practice or attribute the patient's scrupulosity to insufficient piety. Collaboration between therapists and clergy can help mitigate reassurance behaviors in patients by helping clergymen recognize the behavior in the patient.

Though widely recommended by specialists, a 2026 study found that only about half of clinicians reported collaboration with clergy, with about a third reporting collaborating with clergy when the clinician and patient did not share the same religion. However, of those who did collaborate with clergy, nearly all responded that collaboration or consultation was helpful in some manner; only one clinician indicated that the collaboration was "somewhat harmful". (Note: Two responded that the collaboration was "neither helpful nor harmful", but none responded that it was "very harmful".)

== Prognosis ==
Prognosis for scrupulosity is generally worse than that of other obsessive–compulsive spectrum disorders. It is relatively treatment-resistant, responding less successfully overall to behavioral therapy and selective serotonin reuptake inhibitors (SSRIs), both of which are traditionally first-line treatments for OCD. Both high levels of scrupulosity and low insight in OCD patients are associated with poor treatment response. Difficulty in addressing scrupulosity in treatment is manifold, as a patient may not believe things that are considered orthodox among other coreligionists, and the difference between disorder and legitimate spiritual struggle is often unclear.

Some studies have found that unacceptable thoughts OCD was overall more receptive to serotonin reuptake inhibitors (SRIs) while the use of CBT was correlated with worse outcomes. Part of this may be explained through clinician temerity, especially worries of overstepping religious boundaries with patients; clinicians missing smaller mental compulsions or avoidence behaviors that maintain behaviors; and patients not expressing obsessions out of shame or worries about stigma. Patients are also more likely to delay treatment or object to treatment altogether as a result of this shame. However, studies of treatments that account for these pitfalls suggest individuals with scrupulosity will not necessarily have worse outcomes with CBT.

Long-term severe cases sometimes lead to "surrender", where the patient gives in to "the urge to commit the sin"; this is considered an extreme distress signal. Those with scrupulosity have a higher incidence of depression, low self-esteem, self-harm, and suicide. More severe forms of OCD are not more associated with scrupulosity overall, but scrupulosity does indicate a higher risk of depressive and other anxious symptoms, as well as signs of obsessive–compulsive personality disorder (OCPD). Symptoms may worsen with stress.

== Epidemiology ==
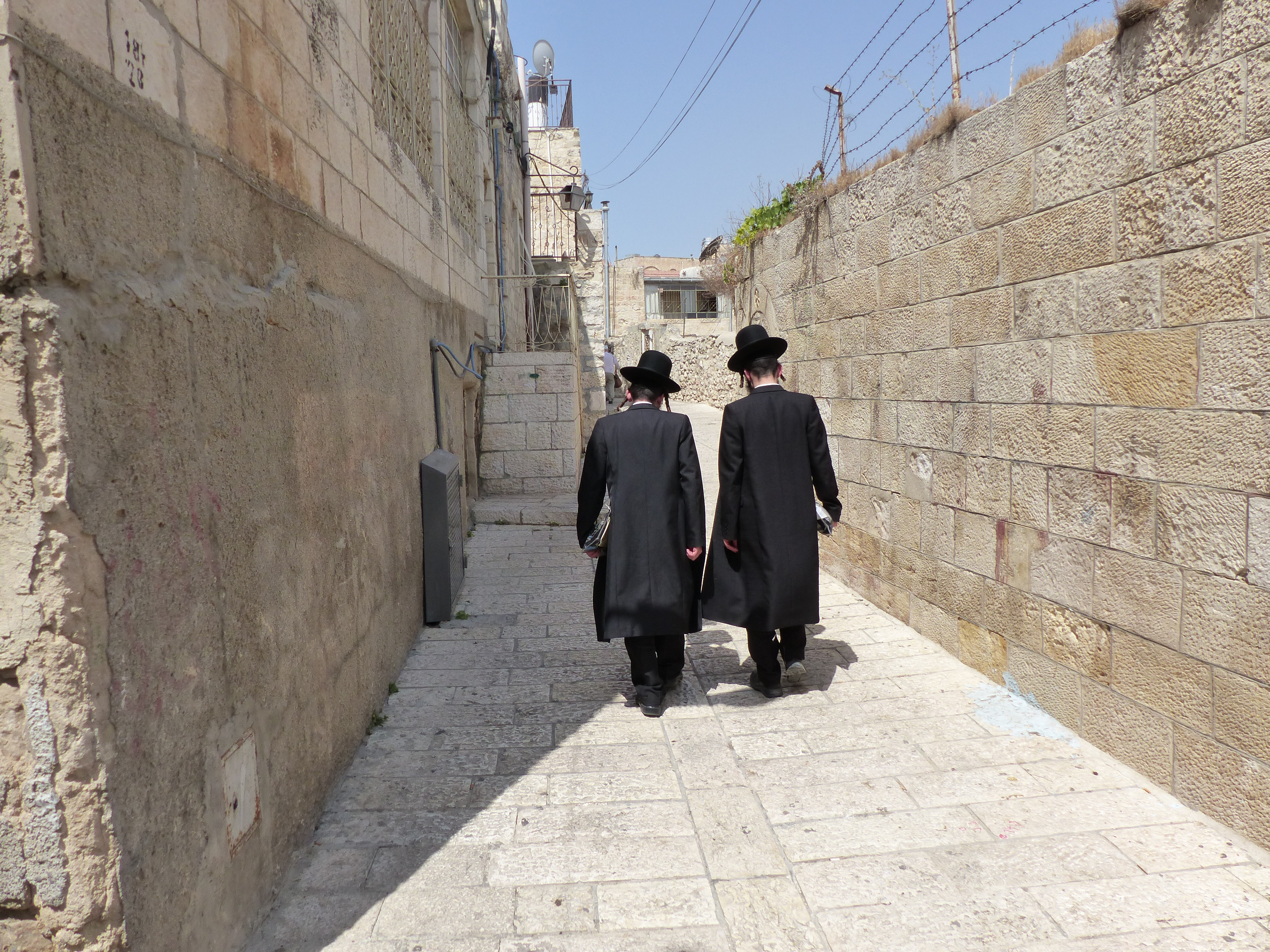
Israelis and other Jewish communities tend to have high rates of scrupulosity.

Scrupulosity is generally considered to be a fairly common subtype of OCD. Although obsessive–compulsive disorder only represents between 1.1% to 1.8% of the general public, scrupulosity cases may comprise a large subset of that group, with estimates between 5% and 33% of OCD patients exhibiting signs. Another study placed the number on a scale from 0% to 93% depending on the place studied, suggesting differences in the prominence of religion culturally may affect rates. One study of Saudi Arabia and Egypt, for example, found rates of 50% and 60% of religion-based symptoms in their OCD populations, respectively. Studies in Western cultures have suggested that while 10% and 33% of people with OCD have religious symptoms, somewhere between 5% and 6% primarily exhibit symptoms of scrupulosity, making it the fifth most-common class of OCD symptoms. Both scrupulosity and poor insight are much more common in cases of childhood-onset OCD, especially in very young children. However, accurate quantification of the afflicted population is difficult, as people with the disorder often seek spiritual guidance instead of mental healthcare. Overall, about 18% of those with scrupulosity identify as having no religious affiliation. While there is no evidence that religious people are more likely to have OCD than the general public, those who are religious are more likely to experience scrupulosity as opposed to other subtypes of OCD.

Attempts to map religious affiliation to scrupulosity have had with mixed outcomes. Several studies suggest Protestants in highly religious cultural contexts have the highest rates of scrupulosity, while a 2019 study places Catholics as having the highest incidence. Others suggest Jewish communities tend to have a higher rate of scrupulosity than other groups. A 2010 analysis found that the prevalence of religious symptoms in those with OCD varies drastically across different countries, from as low as 2% in the United Kingdom to as high as 62% in Israel. Studies of Orthodox and non-Orthodox Jewish populations found that Orthodox Jews were better able to identify scrupulosity and more likely to recommend clinical treatment than their non-Orthodox counterparts.

It is possible that religions which place particular emphasis on adherence to a behavioral code may influence the categorization of obsessions as contamination-based rather than religious based. For example, Jews following kosher diets and Muslims following halal diets may have obsessions relating to the contamination of food through a religious basis rather than a medical one, which would typically be categorized under contamination OCD. Similarly, Catholic individuals with scrupulosity demonstrate marked emphasis on perfectionism as compared to other Christian patients.

Studies involving ethnic background and national origin suggest that cultural considerations are relevant to the manifestation of symptoms. For example, a 2011 study found that contamination concerns among Turkish Muslims were higher than their Bulgarian-born counterparts, which may be attributable to the higher salience of Islam in everyday life in Turkey. In India, male OCD patients report higher levels of religious symptoms. Studies of East Asian populations suggests Chinese OCD patients exhibit higher rates of scrupulosity than Japanese patients.

LGBTQ+ individuals have higher rates of scrupulosity symptoms, which aligns with their overall higher representation among the "unacceptable thoughts" subtypes of OCD. In general, patients whose families do not accept their sexual orientation or gender identity are more likely to develop symptoms of scrupulosity.

== History ==
=== Ancient ===
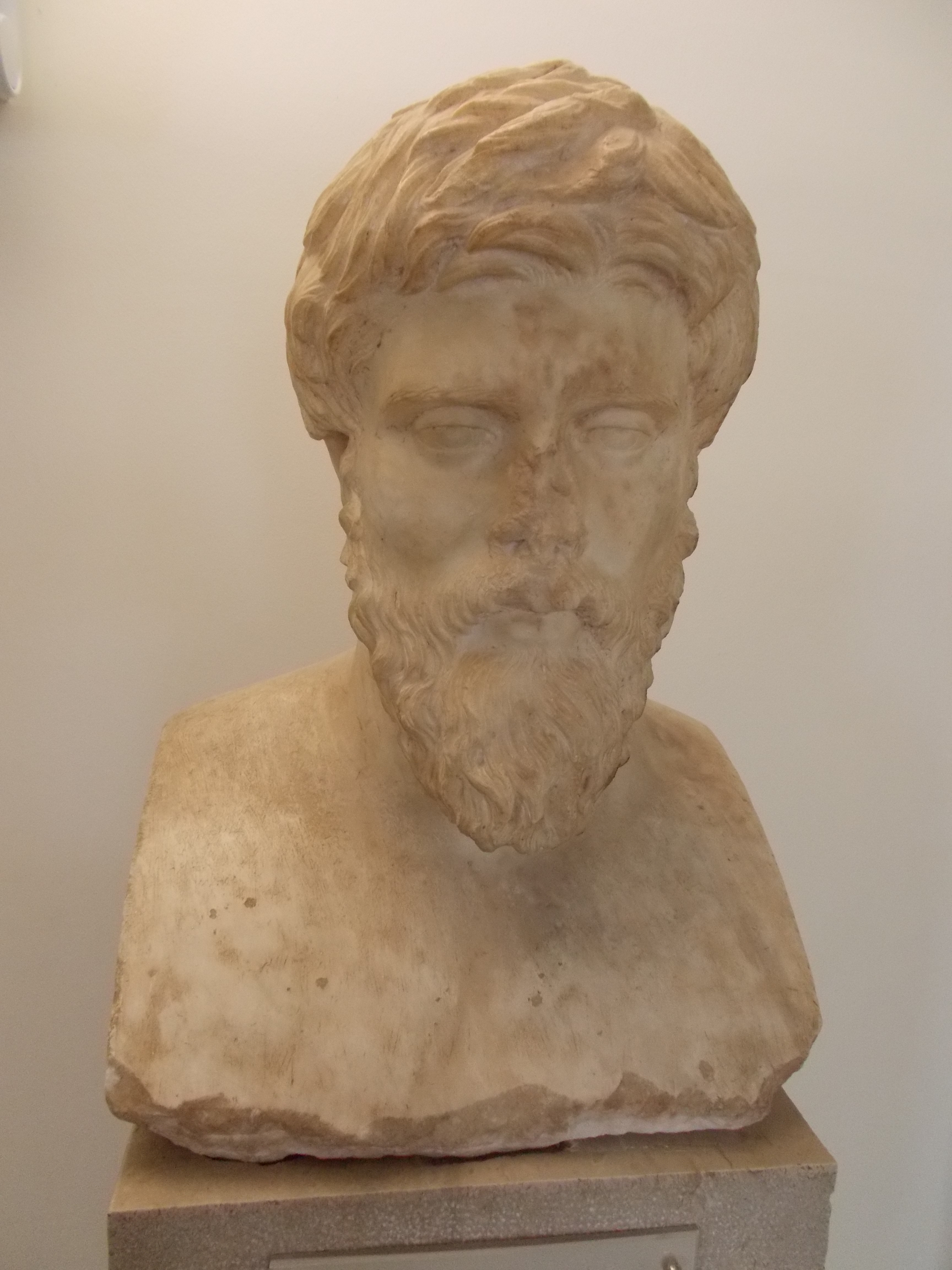
Plutarch distinguished scrupulosity from similar conditions during the first century AD.

Scrupulosity may be one of the earliest identified mental illnesses. The oldest text thought to contain a description of OCD is from a Buddhist text estimated to be around 2,500 years old. It describes a monk who was obsessed with sweeping the floor to the point of neglecting his monastic duties.

The ancient Greek philosopher Theophrastus (c. 371 BC – c. 287 BC) appears to have described OCD as a whole in his book Characters, an outline of moral archetypes, under the title of the Deisidaimon (Ancient Greek: Δεισιδαίμων), though this character is generally considered satirical. During the first century AD, the Greeks described scrupulosity-like state of mind they called deisidaimonia (δεισιδαιμονία, lit. 'fear of the gods'). During this period, Plutarch (fl. c. 100 AD), himself a priest at the Temple of Apollo in Delphi, described the condition as a "mental anguish unnecessarily endured" and referred to those with it as "victims". Plutarch distinguished the condition from other forms of superstition and atheism, describing it more akin to a phobia. He described a person with the condition thus:

[He] turns pale under his crown of flowers, is terrified while he sacrifices, prays with a faltering voice, scatters incense with trembling hands, and all in all proves how mistaken was the saying of Pythagoras that we are at our best when approaching the gods. For that is the time when the superstitious are most miserable and most woebegone.

=== Medieval ===
By the Early Middle Ages, the Latin terms obsessio, compulsio, and impulsio began to find use as descriptors of obsessive–compulsive behaviors. The Italian monk and saint Benedict of Nursia endorsed certain kinds of brief prayers over longer ones in some cases to ward against conpunctione ('pangs of doubt'). Around the same period, John Climacus, a Greek hermit, was described by a fellow monk who composed his biography as having "an extraordinary grace of healing the spiritual disorders of souls". John Climacus's book The Ladder of Divine Ascent (Koine Greek: Κλῖμαξ, Klimax), a thirty-part treatise on ascetic monasticism, addresses combating obsessions, often in ways that are compatible with modern psychiatric practice. In part 23, he describes attempting to combat such thoughts as "trying to lock up the wind" and the embarrassment of such thoughts when taken to confession:

This deceiver and corrupter of souls has often driven many out of their mind. No other thought is so difficult to tell in confession as this. That is why it often remains with many to the very end of their lives. For nothing gives the demons and bad thoughts such power over us as nourishing and hiding them in our heart unconfessed.

The Talmud, the central text of Rabbinical Judaism compiled around 500 AD, appears to contain examples of the disorder. By the 11th century, Jewish religious texts contain "pretty clear cases". In the 13th century, the Catalan rabbi Nachmanides addressed a concern about whether an unseen rodent might have unknowingly brought leavened bread into the house during a Passover celebration, thereby potentially rendering the hosting home unclean. He proscribes such thoughts writing that "it is not good for a person to be too strict, looking into doubts to invalidate".

During the Late Middle Ages, scrupulosity gained topical currency among theologians and religious scholars, such as Antoninus of Florence and Jean Gerson, who saw their societal role as "guardians of conscience". Like John Climacus, Antoninus's expressions of accepting doubt and avoiding engaging with obsessions are seen as forerunners to modern cognitive-behavioral approaches today. The American scholar of religion James Aho describes "an epidemic of scrupulosity" which pervaded the Late Middle Ages, bolstered by the period's relatively frequent plagues, military conflicts, and economic downturns. Records of behaviors associated with scrupulosity explode during this period as the afflicted kept record of their often daily trips to the confessional "in an increasingly frantic effort to escape God's censure".

Several notable religious figures during the Reformation such as Martin Luther and Ignatius of Loyola are each thought to have had scrupulosity. (Note: There is disagreement about whether Ignatius experienced scrupulosity per se. Thomas Santa, a Catholic priest and expert in scrupulosity, has characterized Ignatius's symptoms as those of a tender conscience, a normal – if painful – spiritual process, rather than scrupulosity.) Ignatius, a Spanish Catholic priest and founder of the Society of Jesus, expresses sentiments in his memoirs about feeling that he had incompletely or ineffectively confessed, despite writing down what he needed to. This caused such distress that his secretary Juan Alfonso de Polanco reported that his confessor required him "not to confess anything of the past, unless it was quite clear", though the prohibition did not improve the situation. De Polanco wrote that "he was in constant anxiety", praying on his knees for seven hours and self-flagellating three times every day. The American psychiatrist Judith Rapoport credits Ignatius of Loyola with providing the Catholic Church with its first working definition of scrupulosity. In letters to others, he emphasizes that excess in devotion may act counter to virtue. In one such letter, he compares two ships in a tumultuous sea: a lack of devotion is a ship without ballast, which causes it to be thrown around, but "excessive zeal" is a ship with too much ballast, which causes it to sink.

=== Modern ===
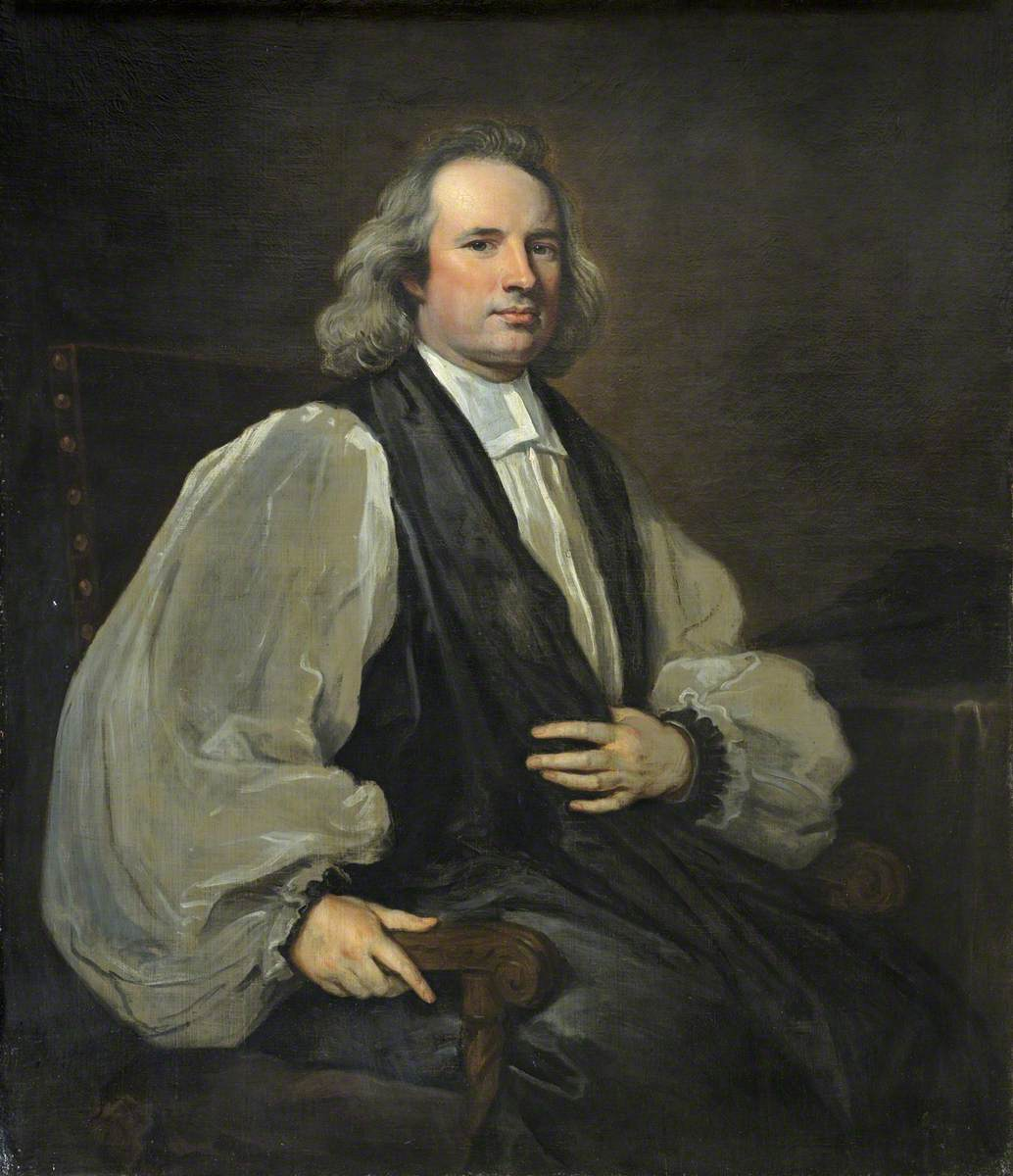
John Moore described scrupulosity as "religious melancholy" in the late 17th century.

In the early modern period, scrupulosity is addressed further. In 1660, the English cleric Jeremy Taylor took note of people who starved themselves for fear of committing the sin of gluttony. He described such individuals as those who, although married, felt extreme guilt engaging in sex with their spouse because they worried it was "secretly an indulgence to the flesh" but ultimately relented because it was their divinely-assigned duty. In 1691, the English Anglican bishop John Moore gave a speech concerning what he called "religious melancholy", which was a major public acknowledgement of scrupulosity as a mental illness. Moore in particular had great pity for the afflicted, writing that "they are mostly good People" who "fear, that what they do, is so defective and unfit to be presented unto God, that He will not accept it". During this same period, the Catholic bishop Alphonsus Liguori is also thought to have had scrupulosity. Today, Scrupulous Anonymous, a Redemptorist newsletter ministering to those with scrupulosity, is published by an organization bearing Liguori's name.

The French nun and saint Thérèse of Lisieux (1873–1897) is known to have had scrupulosity to such an extent that she experienced debilitating headaches. She compared the disorder to a painful martyrdom.

In 1994, the American Psychiatric Association officially differentiated religious symptoms from other forms of OCD in the fourth edition of the Diagnostic and Statistical Manual of Mental Disorders (DSM-IV). The following publications – DSM-IV-TR and DSM-V – include scrupulous behavior as a criterion for both OCD and OCPD.

== See also ==
- Catholic guilt
- Counterphobic attitude
- Examination of conscience
- Hyperreligiosity
- Mental illness in ancient Greece
- Mental illness in ancient Rome
- Psychology of religion
- Spiritual crisis
- Spiritual death
- Spiritual distress
- Spiritual dryness
