= Schizophrenia (disambiguation) =

Schizophrenia is a mental disorder characterized by abnormal behavior and misinterpretation of reality.

Schizophrenia or Schizophrenic may also refer to:

== Music ==
- Schizophrenia (Sepultura album), 1987 Sepultura album and its 2024 Cavalera Conspiracy re-release
- Schizophrenia (Wayne Shorter album), 1967
- Schizophrenic (JC Chasez album), 2004
- Schizophrenic, an album by Wayne Wonder, 2001
- "Schizophrenia", a song by Sonic Youth from Sister, 1987
- "Schizophrenic", a song by Bizzy Bone from The Gift, 2001
- "Schizophrenia", a song by XXXTentacion from ?, 2018
- "Schizophrenic", a song by Mumzy Stranger from Journey Begins, 2010
- "Schizophrenia", a pseudonym used by Tom Middleton when Collaborating with Aphex Twin on Analogue Bubblebath.

== Other uses ==
- Schizophrenia (film), a 1997 Russian crime film
- Schizophrenia (object-oriented programming), a complication of delegation in object-oriented programming
- Schizophrenia (demo), a 1995 demo by Polish group Exodus
- Schizofrenia (video game), a 1985 video game

== See also ==
- Schizophrenia: An Unfinished History, a 2023 non-fiction book
- Schizophreniac: The Whore Mangler, a 1997 American exploitation film
- Schizo (disambiguation)
