= Jealousy in religion =

Jealousy in religion examines how the scriptures and teachings of various religions deal with the topic of jealousy.

Religions may be compared and contrasted on how they deal with two issues: concepts of divine jealousy, and rules about the provocation and expression of human jealousy.

== Divine jealousy ==
=== Greek mythology ===
The gods and goddesses of ancient Greek mythology were no strangers to romantic jealousy. No god or goddess illustrates this better than Hera. Hera was the wife of Zeus. Zeus, the leader of the gods on Mt. Olympus, frequently took lovers in addition to Hera. Hera in turn exacted jealous revenge against her romantic rivals. The examples below come from the Wikipedia article on Hera:

- Leto – When Hera discovered that Leto was pregnant and that Hera's husband, Zeus, was the father, she banned Leto from giving birth on "terra-firma", or the mainland, or any island at sea. Alternatively, Hera kidnapped Ilithyia, the goddess of childbirth, to prevent Leto from going into labor. The other gods forced Hera to let her go.

- Callisto/Arcas – A follower of Artemis, Callisto took a vow to remain a virgin. But Zeus fell in love with her and disguised himself as Artemis in order to lure her into his embrace. Hera then turned Callisto into a bear out of revenge.

- Semele/Dionysus – In one of various birth myths of him, Dionysus was a son of Zeus by a mortal woman. A jealous Hera again attempted to kill the child, this time by sending Titans to rip Dionysus to pieces after luring the baby with toys. Though Zeus drove the Titans away with his thunderbolts but only after the Titans ate everything but the heart, which was saved, variously, by Athena, Rhea, or Demeter.

- Io – Hera almost caught Zeus with a mistress named Io, a fate avoided by Zeus turning Io into a beautiful white heifer. However, Hera was not completely fooled and demanded Zeus give her the heifer as a present. Once Io was given to Hera, she placed her in the charge of Argus Panoptes to keep her separated from Zeus. Hermes freed her on Zeus' orders.

- Lamia – Lamia was a queen of Libya, whom Zeus loved. Hera turned her into a monster and murdered their children. Or, alternately, she killed Lamia's children and the grief turned her into a monster. Lamia was cursed with the inability to close her eyes so that she would always obsess over the image of her dead children.

Zeus, or the other gods, would frequently intervene to undo some of the damage caused by Hera's vengeance. However, the message in these stories seems clear—provoking divine jealousy can result in terrible suffering.

=== Judaism ===
The concept of divine jealousy in Judaism stems from the concept of monotheism. One of the most well known assertions of monotheism in Judaism is the Shema. The Shema proclaims:

"Hear, O Israel: The Lord is our God; The Lord is one." (Deuteronomy 6:4, World English Bible)

Reciting the Shema affirms an individual's faith in one God. Since there is only one God, worship of multiple gods wrongly gives to false gods what belongs to the one true God. Worship of multiple gods constitutes a form of spiritual infidelity against the one God. The one God responds to this infidelity with jealousy. For example, the second of the Ten Commandments states:

"You shall not make for yourselves an idol, nor any image of anything that is in the heavens above, or that is in the earth beneath, or that is in the water under the earth: you shall not bow yourself down to them, nor serve them, for I, Yahweh your God, am a jealous God, visiting the iniquity of the fathers on the children, on the third and on the fourth generation of those who hate me, and showing loving kindness to thousands of those who love me and keep my commandments." (Exodus 20:4–6, World English Bible)

This prohibition is later repeated in the verse:

"...for you shall worship no other god: for the Lord, whose name is Jealous (Kanna), is a jealous God (El Kanna)." (Exodus 34:14, World English Bible)

Divine jealousy in Judaism thus refers to how the one God responds to humans worshipping multiple gods. Humans are prohibited from worshipping multiple gods and provoking the jealousy of the one true God.

=== Christianity ===
Christianity has adopted the concept of divine jealousy from Judaism. There is only one true God, who becomes jealous when people worship other gods. The prohibition against worshipping other gods in the Ten Commandments is widely accepted in Christianity.

However, the Christian concept of divine jealousy is not identical to the Judaic concept of divine jealousy. Paul the Apostle has extended the concept of divine jealousy to include accepting false doctrines. Paul writes:

"For I am jealous over you with a godly jealousy. For I married you to one husband, that I might present you as a pure virgin to Christ. But I am afraid that somehow, as the serpent deceived Eve in his craftiness, so your minds might be corrupted from the simplicity that is in Christ. For if he who comes preaches another Jesus, whom we did not preach, or if you receive a different spirit, which you did not receive, or a different 'good news', which you did not accept, you put up with that well enough." (2 Corinthians 11:2–4, World English Bible)

Just as the Ten Commandments asserts that God is jealous when His people worship other gods, Paul claims to be jealous when the churches he founded turn away from the doctrines he taught about Christ. This is just an analogy, however. Paul does not claim be the equal of God. He instead suggests it is Christ (the groom) who has reason to be jealous when his bride (the church) turns to false doctrines about Him. Paul makes the same argument with respect to doctrinal interpretation of the sacrament of communion:

"You can’t both drink the cup of the Lord and the cup of demons. You can’t both partake of the table of the Lord, and of the table of demons. Or do we provoke the Lord to jealousy?" (10:21–22, World English Bible)

=== Islam ===
A hadith attributed to Abu Hurairah reports:

Allah becomes jealous and the believer becomes jealous. Allah’s jealousy occurs when a believer does what He has made unlawful for him.

Sunni muslims tend to view this as Sahih.

== Human jealousy ==
=== Judaism ===
The Judaic scriptures warn people not to provoke jealousy by committing adultery. The jealous spouse may exact revenge.

"He who commits adultery with a woman is void of understanding. He who does it destroys his own soul. He will get wounds and dishonor. His reproach will not be wiped away. For jealousy arouses the fury of the husband. He won’t spare in the day of vengeance. He won’t regard any ransom, neither will he rest content, though you give many gifts." (Book of Proverbs 6:32–35, World English Bible)

The destructive potential of romantic jealousy may underlie the strong prohibitions against actions that can provoke it. Two of the Ten Commandments prohibit feelings and actions that could potentially provoke romantic jealousy. The tenth commandment says "You shall not covet your neighbor's wife," and the seventh commandment says "You shall not commit adultery." (Exodus 20: 14–17, World English Bible). The punishment for committing adultery was death, both for the adulteress and the adulterer.

The destructive potential of male romantic jealousy may also underlie a ritual in the Mosaic laws that test the sexual fidelity of a wife. (Numbers 5:11–30, World English Bible) The ritual is triggered when a husband becomes jealous over a real or suspected sexual affair, because his wife has repeatedly been in seclusion with another man, and he has warned her not to continue to see this man. The husband takes the wife, called a sotah, to the temple priests. The temple priests mix a drink composed of holy water, dust from the temple floor, part of a meal offering, and a parchment with God's Name on it. The wife drinks the mixture. If the wife has been sexually unfaithful, the drink will cause her to die: the flesh will fall off her thighs and her belly will bloat. The male adulterer dies, as well. If the wife has been sexually faithful, no harm will come to her and she will bear a beautiful child in the near future. The outcomes of this ritual are designed to appease the husband's jealousy and prove the wife's innocence, since there are no witnesses. If the wife does not become ill, the husband can take satisfaction in the wife's fidelity and look forward to a new child. This is a ritual of ancient Judaism. Because of the destruction of the Temple, Modern Jewish people do not practice all the rituals of ancient Judaism, such as the one just described.

=== Christianity ===
Many Christian writings do not clearly distinguish jealousy and envy. Only a few verses in the New Testament mention jealousy, and many of these verses appear to refer to envy rather than romantic rivalry:

- "You have heard that it was said, You shall not commit adultery. But I say to you, anyone who looks on a woman to lust after her has committed adultery with her already in his heart." (Matthew 5:27–28)

- "But if you have bitter jealousy and selfish ambition in your heart, don’t boast and don’t lie against the truth. This wisdom is not that which comes down from above, but is earthly, sensual, and demonic. For where jealousy and selfish ambition are, there is confusion and every evil deed." (Epistle of James 3:14–16, World English Bible)

- "Now the works of the flesh are obvious, which are: adultery, sexual immorality, uncleanness, lustfulness, idolatry, sorcery, hatred, strife, jealousies, outbursts of anger, rivalries, divisions, heresies, envyings, murders, drunkenness, orgies, and things like these; of which I forewarn you, even as I also forewarned you, that those who practice such things will not inherit the Kingdom of God." (Galatians 5:19–21, World English Bible)

- "For insofar as there is jealousy, strife, and factions among you, aren’t you fleshly, and don’t you walk in the ways of men?" (1 Corinthians 3:3, World English Bible)

- "Let us walk properly, as in the day; not in reveling and drunkenness, not in sexual promiscuity and lustful acts, and not in strife and jealousy." (Epistle to the Romans 13:13, World English Bible)

These verses indicate early Christians viewed envy as inconsistent with their faith. The New Advent Catholic encyclopedia equates jealousy with envy. It describes envy as contrary to the Golden Rule taught by Jesus and contrary to the spirit of solidarity that should permeate all humanity—especially the Christian community. Jealousy, at least in the form of envy, is incompatible with the principles of Christian faith.

=== Islam ===
According to some Muslim scholars being jealous is akin to being displeased with what God has given and not given to certain people. Thus, these scholars advise dealing with jealousy by being grateful (shukr) for what one has, and being patient (sabr) while waiting for what one desires.

=== Buddhism ===
In Buddhism, the term irshya is commonly translated as either envy or jealousy. Irshya is defined as a state of mind in which one is highly agitated to obtain wealth and honor for oneself, but unable to bear the excellence of others.

== See also ==
- Attachment in adults
- Emotion
- Jealousy
- Jealousy sociology
- Jealousy in art
- Monogamy
- Open marriage
