= Schizo =

Schizo may refer to:

== Films ==
- Schizo (1976 film), a 1976 horror film
- The Psychopath or Schizo, a 1966 British horror film

== Other uses ==
- Disparaging term for someone with Schizophrenia
- Schizo, a mixtape by American rapper Dreezy
- Schizo, a series of cartoons by Ivan Brunetti

== See also ==
- The Schizo's, a Dutch punk rock band
- Crazyhouse, a form of chess also known as schizo-chess
- Skitzo, an American thrash metal band
- "Skitzo", a 2023 song by Travis Scott from Utopia
- Schizophrenia (disambiguation)
