= Scrupulous Anonymous =

Catholic newsletter for sufferers of scrupulosity

Scrupulous Anonymous is a Catholic monthly newsletter and website published by Liguori Publications, written primarily for individuals who suffer from scrupulosity, a manifestation of obsessive–compulsive disorder (OCD) focusing on religious and moral themes. It is a ministry of the Redemptorists founded by St. Alphonsus Liguori. The newsletter is run by Thomas Santa, a Redemptorist priest who ministers to those with scrupulosity.

Liguori himself suffered from "scruples" and feelings of religious guilt in his own life and developed techniques for helping people with the condition. Ignatius Loyola, founder of the Jesuits, also struggled with scrupulosity.

The newsletter features a main article and a section dedicated to answering questions submitted by readers.

Many people struggle with faith issues about sin, guilt, punishment, and hell, but others so fear offending God – or fear never achieving God's forgiveness – that they are unable to participate in daily life without experiencing severe doubt and anxiety. Rather than experiencing faith as a source of peace, their faith causes them to obsess over the decisions they make. The newsletter ministers to the afflicted.

Psychologist William Van Ornum reported a survey of one thousand subscribers to Scrupulous Anonymous and documented their feelings of anguish and suffering.

In his book The Doubting Disease, Joseph Ciarrocchi stated that: "I have found the newsletter a useful adjunct to therapy for religious persons".

Based on a half-century of questions and answers published in Scrupulous Anonymous, the book Understanding Scrupulosity: Questions and Encouragement addresses concerns related to sin, thoughts, dreams, fantasies, and sexuality, as well as confession, self-worth, prayer, and God's grace.
