= Sexual orientation obsessive–compulsive disorder =

Form of obsessive–compulsive disorder

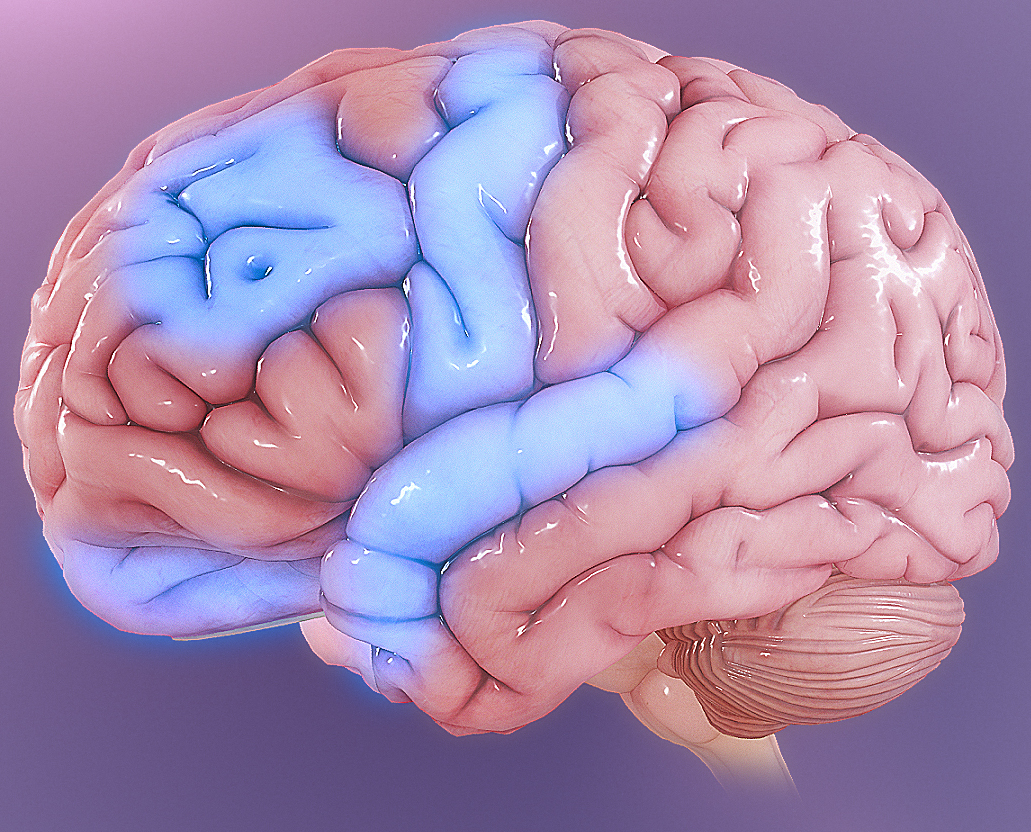
Brain of a person with obsessive-compulsive disorder

Sexual orientation OCD (also known as SO-OCD) is a form of primarily obsessional obsessive–compulsive disorder characterised by intrusive thoughts, intrusive sensations, and compulsions related to doubts about one's sexual orientation. OCD was initially categorised as an anxiety disorder. However, in DSM-5 published in 2013, it has been reclassified into its own distinct category. According to the latest edition of DSM, obsessions are unwanted, repetitive thoughts that cause significant anxiety. In response, the individual often tries to neutralize these thoughts by performing specific actions, which is known as compulsions. Patients feel compelled to practice these rituals, either to relieve anxiety or prevent something bad from happening. In SO-OCD, the obsession takes the form of intrusive doubts about one’s sexual orientation, leading to compulsive behaviours to seek reassurance. Although SO-OCD is not mentioned as such in the chapter "Obsessive-Compulsive and Related Disorders" of the DSM-V, the chapter on "Paraphilic Disorders" briefly mentions it when differentiating pedophilia from Pedophilia-OCD: "there are occasional individuals who complain about ego-dystonic thoughts and worries about possible attraction to children. Clinical interviewing usually reveals an absence of sexual thoughts about children during high states of sexual arousal (e.g., approaching orgasm during masturbation) and sometimes additional ego-dystonic, intrusive sexual ideas (e.g., concerns about homosexuality)".

== Clinical presentation ==
The four components of the OCD cycle shown in cycle.

Specifically, patients are confused about their real sexual orientation, with fears of changing one's sexuality ("What if I’m wrong about myself?”) and concerns about others' opinions ("What if everyone finds out?"). These thoughts can be inconsistent with the past experience. One typical pattern of thinking was described by Dr Williams: “How can I be attracted to men if I have always loved women? I have dated many women before and never thought about a relationship with a man. Thinking about doing sexual acts with a member of the same sex repulses me. I can't possibly be gay. But why am I thinking of men all the time now? That must mean I am gay". These intrusive thoughts moves one’s attention to individuals of the gender they suspect being attracted to, misinterpreting it as a confirmation of unwanted changes in sexual orientation, which can cause distress.

In an attempt to remove these obsessive thoughts, patients develop compulsive behaviours such as repeatedly imagining sexual situations as a form of reassurance. Some individuals seek further confirmation of their sexual orientation by engaging in sexual activity with partners, or by watching heterosexual and homosexual pornography to compare arousal levels. However, this reassurance-seeking behaviour often backfires. As Williams notes, attempts to confirm heterosexuality through sexual acts can lead to performance anxiety or reduced arousal, which can be misread as evidence of a shift in orientation, thereby reinforcing the obsessive cycle.

== History ==
Sexual Orientation OCD was initially known as Homosexual OCD (HOCD), as this disease was originally described as involving intrusive thoughts about possible changes in sexual orientation experienced by heterosexual individuals. The term “HOCD” emerged from online self-help communities in the early days of the internet to categorize the obsessive fear of being homosexual. Over time, understanding of SO-OCD has expanded. It is now widely recognised that individuals of any sexual orientation, including those who identify as LGBTQ+, can experience sexual orientation-related obsessions.

== Misconceptions about SO-OCD ==
Sexual Orientation OCD is often misunderstood by clinicians. In one study, 84.6% of cases were initially misdiagnosed by health professionals. One common misconception of SO-OCD is anxiety or depression resulted from sexual orientation crisis, rather than being recognised as a form of obsessive-compulsive disorder. This misunderstanding can lead to harmful outcomes. Williams describes a case in which a therapist misinterpreted the symptoms and focused on exploring patient’s sexual identity, rather than applying appropriate OCD treatments. This misdiagnosis worsened individual’s symptoms, leading to severe distress and suicidal thoughts.

It is important to clarify that people with SO-OCD are not homophobic and do not want to harm LGBTQ+ groups. The anxiety usually arises from the fear of losing one’s current sexual orientation, which is something that the individual deeply values, rather than from any negative feelings toward any LGBTQ+ group.

== Causes ==
As a subtype of obsessive-compulsive disorder, Sexual-Orientation OCD shares many of the same underlying causes as other subtypes of OCD. Abnormalities in the amygdala contribute to OCD symptoms with hyperactivity in the basolateral amygdala (BLA) that intensifies the highlighted fear and anxiety. Additionally, genetic factors also play a role, with evidence from 18 family studies, 16 suggest a familial predisposition to the disorder. Although specific genetic loci have not been conclusively identified in human beings, several studies have pointed to the contribution of genes related to serotonin and glutamate signaling, as well as genes affecting synaptic connectivity. These findings indicate that SO-OCD likely arises from a combination of neurobiological and genetic factors.

On the other hand, there might also be some sociocultural factors causing SO-OCD. Some researchers believe that it might by rooted in societal homophobic attitudes. People with SO-OCD would thus be afraid to become an identity that is perceived as taboo. While this explains why heterosexual people obsess about being gay, it falls short in justifying why a gay person with SO-OCD, for instance, can be afraid to become heterosexual, if heterosexuality constitutes the norm in society. Instead, a queer theoretically informed discourse analysis of online forum posts written by LGBTQ+ people with SO-OCD suggests that the sociocultural causes of SO-OCD are best explained through a fear of losing a normative identity. Any process of normalization potentially generates a fear of losing that privileged position. For instance, LGBTQ+ people have to detach themselves from the heteronormative social order by constructing a non-conforming identity. Since Western societies have increasingly accepted non-heterosexual identities, there is an increasing pressure for LGBTQ+ to conform to the newly formed norms that constitute their identities. This theory also explains why there are people experiencing Pedophilia-OCD (since they are afraid of losing their normative identity), while there have not been any reports of people with pedophilic desires obsessing about the possibility of losing their pedophilic identity. The reason boils down to the fact that pedophilia is the ultimate non-normative and taboo sexual identity, and it would not make sense to fear losing a non-normative position in society.

== Treatment ==
Historically, OCD was initially considered difficult to treat, as patients often showed limited improvements with traditional psychodynamic therapy, systematic desensitization, aversion therapy or medication alone. A turning point came with Exposure and Response Prevention (ERP) that reduced patient’s OCD symptoms while maintaining significant improvements for years after treatment. ERP, as a gold-standard behavioural treatment for OCD, is also used in treating sexual orientation OCD. The treatment begins with a psychoeducation about OCD and an assessment to identify external (situations, objects, etc...) and internal (thoughts and physiological reactions) stimuli that might trigger one’s obsessive thoughts and subsequent anxiety. These factors are ranked in a fear hierarchy to guide exposure sessions. During the therapy, patients are gradually and repeatedly exposed to anxiety-provoking thoughts, while resisting compulsions with the help of the therapist. Examples of this include repeating anxiety-inducing phrases or ideas until they lose their meaning and stop causing distress, coming into contact with items that trigger one's OCD, and reading or listening to stressful material to reduce its distressing effects.

SO-OCD can be particularly challenging to treat because patients often engage in covert mental rituals rather than overt behaviours. Instead of visible compulsions like washing hands, they may silently analyse their thoughts, seek reassurance, or test their arousal levels. These internal responses are easy to overlook, so therapists must be especially attentive to identifying and addressing them during treatment.

However, standard treatment of SO-OCD can reinforce anti-LGBTQ+ stigma, exacerbating the existing discrimination, if not implement thoughtfully. There are three strategies to minimise negative impacts of the treatment:

- Psychoeducation to correct the misinformation about LGBTQ+ identities;
- Using non-stereotyped LGBTQ+ representations during the treatment sessions;
- Personalised exposures to real fear hidden in the anxiety such as disconnection from loved ones, while avoiding reinforcement of harmful stereotypes.
