= Catastrophic schizophrenia =

Obsolete term for a form of schizophrenia

In psychiatry, catastrophic schizophrenia or schizocaria is an outdated term for a rare, acute form of schizophrenia leading to chronic psychosis and deterioration of the personality.

Catastrophic schizophrenia was thought to be the most severe subtype of schizophrenia, as it had "an acute onset and rapid decline into a chronic state". Gerhard Mauz defined it as schizocaria, a psychosis that caused the absolute destruction of the core of one's being.

The term "catastrophic schizophrenia" has fallen out of use due to a number of reasons, including advances in psychiatric treatment, along with modern refinement of the definition and subtypes of schizophrenia. This term has not been included in any version of the Diagnostic and Statistical Manual of Mental Disorders (DSM). In modern terms, patients with catastrophic schizophrenia would likely be considered Kraepelinian patients with "very poor outcome schizophrenia."

== History ==
Schizophrenia evolved from Kraepelin's dementia praecox, which was first defined in 1893. Using dementia praecox as a base, Eugen Bleuler defined and differentiated subtypes of schizophrenia at the turn of the century. He stated that catastrophic schizophrenia was characterized by an acute onset of a severe psychosis, followed with little improvement by a severe chronic psychosis lasting until death.

Young adults (aged 16–25) were at the highest risk of developing catastrophic schizophrenia. It was almost entirely exclusive to upper class and intellectuals. Other risk factors included difficulty adapting to change, individualism, and introversion.

E.B. Strauss stated that schizophrenia could come about in two ways: either catastrophically or through a series of 'attacks'. Strauss used catastrophic to refer to schizophrenia that ran a rapidly progressing and continuous course. According to Strauss, catastrophic schizophrenia took a similar course to catatonic schizophrenia and hebephrenia, with all three ending in the total collapse into psychosis within two to four years.

== Decline ==
Eugen Bleuler found that catastrophic schizophrenia affected 10-15% of people with schizophrenia. However, over time, the number of patients that fit this diagnosis declined significantly. The outcome of a study by Luc Ciompi and Christian Müller in 1976 has shown that only 6 percent of patients with schizophrenia were judged to have catastrophic schizophrenia.

In longitudinal studies begun in the 1930s and ending in the 1980s, Manfred Bleuler (Eugen's son) found the incidence of catastrophic schizophrenia had declined significantly since his father's study. Manfred Bleuler posited that improved hospitals, nursing care, and rehabilitation efforts led to this decline. The decline of electroconvulsive therapy (ECT), chlorpromazine, and insulin shock therapy, used extensively in the 1940s and 1950s, could have also played a role in eliminating catastrophic schizophrenia. The term was not included in the DSM-I and is now no longer used due to changes in how the sub-types of schizophrenia are defined.
