= Thought-action fusion =

Category of painful thinking or beliefs

- Specialty: Psychiatry, clinical psychology

Thought-action fusion (TAF) is the tendency for individuals to assume that certain thoughts either increase the likelihood of catastrophic events (likelihood-TAF) or imply the immorality of their character (morality-TAF).

In more technical terms, TAF is a polyseme defining false beliefs or self-confusing mind wandering about a biased and painful association/fusion between subjects' spontaneous thoughts and imaginary latent egodystonic desires or magical-thinking capabilities. These imaginary latent egodystonic desires or magical-thinking capabilities generally express harmful actions/behaviours (e.g., compulsions) that subjects appraise as highly possible, even though they have never existed so far.

== Causes ==
The main causes of TAF are (one or several) hold false beliefs that mind-wandering episodes involving cognitive/interpretation biases have generated, from specific patterns of intrusive thoughts. Besides, a high level of negative affectivity is a mediator in the statistical relations between TAF and the existence of psychological pains (e.g. anxiety, depression and shame), or some mental disorders.

== Examples ==
An ADAA webinar highlighted several examples of TAF, such as:

| Intrusive thoughts | Cognitive biases | False beliefs |
|---|---|---|
| Driving is exciting, but anyone can run down pedestrians. | This terrible thought is definitively a sign. | I am losing control; I am going to run over a pedestrian anytime... |
| My sharp knife could kill a baby. | This horrific thought is almost surely revealing. | I am probably going to kill my child in the near future... |

== Categories ==
The two main categories of TAF are the:

- Likelihood TAF, i.e. anxious and false beliefs (e.g. magical thinking) assuming that specific intrusive thoughts would trigger the (thought) harmful events in the future;
- Moral TAF, i.e. uncertainty-evoking and false beliefs that specific intrusive thoughts about religiously or ethically/morally inappropriate behaviours, are as reprehensible or shameful as actually performing the intrusive thoughts' content.

== Diagnosis ==
Simple interviews with specific health professionals (e.g. psychologists, psychiatrists) allow diagnosing TAF; there also exists a reliable psychometrics/estimator which is the: thought-action fusion questionnaire/scale.

== Disorders ==
TAF happens in the anxiety disorders (e.g. GAD), obsessive-compulsive disorders (e.g. pure O) and eating disorders (e.g. anorexia); it generally worsens the mental disorders' severities or outcomes, irrespective of the treatments. Thought-action fusion is commonly associated with scrupulosity; thought-action fusion amplifies the individual's already-excessive feelings of guilt.

== Treatments ==
The main medial treatments for TAF are the cognitive-behavioral therapies, but mindfulness therapies like the acceptance and commitment therapy may also help. Moreover medications like selective serotonin reuptake inhibitors may increase the psychotherapy efficiency, by alleviating the psychological pains the TAF induces—see section on Causes.

== See also ==
- Mental disorders
- GAD
- Pure O
- Anorexia
- Medical treatments
- Psychotherapies
