= Physical health in schizophrenia =

Relation between physical health and schizophrenia

People with schizophrenia are at a higher than average risk of physical ill health, and earlier death than the general population. The fatal conditions include cardiovascular, respiratory and metabolic disorders.

Although death by suicide in schizophrenia has received much needed attention, and is the leading cause of death among males, death from cardiovascular disease is more common in females, accounting for up to 75 percent of deaths. The causes of physical health problems include factors associated with mental illness and its treatment, poverty, poor housing, higher rates of smoking, poor diet and lack of exercise.

== Dynamics ==
Despite the high rates of physical health problems, mental health service users report that health care workers overlook their physical health needs. Service users would like mental health practitioners to do more for their physical health. Rethink interviewed 2,998 mental health service users, over half of whom lived with a diagnosed severe mental illness. Nearly one third said regular physical health checks were in their top three priorities for improving services. Mental health practitioners may feel unable to provide physical health input. Also there may be a feeling that people with mental health problems will not be interested in physical health education and support. In fact, much health promotion is simple and well received by service users. One review showed that people with schizophrenia benefited from a variety of behavioural interventions and achieved weight loss and lifestyle change.

Schizophrenia also affects the attendance to cancer screening which is seen as one of the factors leading to shorter life expectancy. For example, women with schizophrenia are half as likely to attend breast cancer screening compared to the general population.

Another study found little evidence to support one intervention over another, but argued that moderately strenuous exercise was important.

== Health policy ==
Many guidelines reflect the need to incorporate physical health care into mental health provision, including NICE in the UK. In primary care, the prodigy website provides practical and accessible advice.

However, a review of international guidelines for physical wellbeing in SMI has found that recommendations are variable. UK guidelines failed to address the specifics of physical health monitoring and lifestyle intervention, while United States guidelines were more descriptive. Field studies suggested that all guidelines were inadequately implemented in practice.

The DoH in the UK has recommended wide-ranging action to enable the general population to choose healthier lifestyles in the Choosing Health white paper.

In the UK the National Health Service (NHS) is deeply split along physical/mental lines. These services tend to treat parts of people separately.

The commissioning framework to support the physical health needs of people with severe mental illness recommends a holistic approach with interagency collaboration.

== Medication ==
The current medical view is that all people with schizophrenia must take medications for the disorder. These antipsychotic medications have adverse effects such as weight gain and induce feelings of fatigue that inhibit physical activity. The request for the people with schizophrenia to exercise for cardiovascular health then take medications (originally named "major tranquilizers") that inhibit activity is a double bind.

== See also ==
- Schizophrenia and smoking
