= Schizophrenia: An Unfinished History =

2022 non-fiction book by Orna Ophir

- Book cover
- Author: Orna Ophir
- Cover artist: Steve Leard
- Series: History of Health and Illness
- Subject: History of schizophrenia
- Genre: Non-fiction
- Publisher: Polity
- Publication date: July 2022
- Publication place: United Kingdom; United States
- Pages: 224
- ISBN: 978-1-509-53647-4

Schizophrenia: An Unfinished History is a 2022 non-fiction book by the practicing psychoanalyst and historian of psychiatry Orna Ophir. The book summarizes the history of the conceptualization, diagnosis, and lived experiences of schizophrenia through the lens of competing views of schizophrenia as a natural, biological construct and as a spectrum of disorders, existing on a continuum of behavior. Ophir argues that schizophrenia will eventually fall out of use as a diagnosis. The book received positive reviews.

== Summary ==
In Schizophrenia: An Unfinished History, Orna Ophir summarizes the history of the concept of schizophrenia, with a focus on its psychiatric definition, diagnosis, and lived experience. The book begins with descriptions of madness from biblical stories and antiquity, discusses the transition from the diagnosis of dementia praecox to schizophrenia through histories of clinical psychiatry and psychoanalysis, analyzes the shifting definition of schizophrenia in the DSM-5, discusses the Hearing Voices Movement and the stigma associated with schizophrenia as a label, and discusses the clinical ethics of the diagnosis and efforts towards its abolition.

The book has an introduction and seven chapters. The introduction sets forth the book's analytical framework. Ophir situates psychiatric and social views of schizophrenia within mutually exclusive paradigms. On the one hand, there is a "categorical" approach that defines schizophrenia as a natural, biological construct that is different in kind from normal behavior and cognition. On the other hand, she contends that others take a "dimensional" view of schizophrenia as existing on a spectrum or continuum, reflecting matters of degree in human behavior.

In the first four chapters of the book, Ophir applies the book's analytical framework to the history of schizophrenia. Chapter 1 discusses historical examples from the Bible and ancient Greek and ancient Roman medicine through the 20th century. Chapter 2 summarizes the history of the development of the diagnosis of schizophrenia, from its 19th century predecessor dementia praecox, in the early 20th centuries by Emil Kraepelin, who took a categorical approach, and Eugen Bleuler, who viewed schizophrenia as being on a spectrum. Chapter 3 analyzes a debate over Freud's competing views of schizophrenia, one of which Ophir argues was categorical and the other dimensional. Chapter 4 analyzes the text of schizophrenia's diagnostic criteria and accompanying materials in the various versions of the Diagnostic and Statistical Manual of Mental Disorders (DSM), from the first edition in 1952, DSM-I, to the 2013 DSM-5.

Chapters 5 focuses on the Hearing Voices Movement and how people who hear voices have reframed their experiences against categorical discourses. Chapter 6 discusses popular and clinical efforts to rename or abolish schizophrenia as a diagnosis. Chapter 7 concludes with a discussion of the clinical ethics of diagnosing a patient with schizophrenia.

== Reception ==
Schizophrenia: An Unfinished History was positively received. The historian Agnes Arnold-Forster in History Today and the psychiatrist Annelore Homberg in Psychosis praised the book, calling it "captivating" and "inspiring and motivating" respectively. The historian Michael Rembis stated that the book is a "well‐written synthesis of secondary literature" that would be most useful for general readers and students. Rembis also critiqued Ophir for using the term "patients" to describe people experiencing mental illness and for not including the perspectives of the psychiatric survivors and mad liberation movements in making her argument for abolishing the concept of schizophrenia. By contrast, Arnold-Foster and Homberg stated that Ophir's clinical experience and perspective made her sensitive to the experiences of people diagnosed with schizophrenia, highlighting the chapters on the Hearing Voices Movement (chapter 5) and stigma (chapter 6).

== Sources ==
- Arnold-Forster, Agnes (June 2022). "Naming It". History Today. Vol. 72, no. 6. p. 99. Archived from the original on September 24, 2023.
- Homberg, Annelore (March 2023). "Schizophrenia. An Unfinished History, edited by Orna Ophir, Cambridge, Polity, 2022, 224 pp., £ 25.00 (hardback), ISBN 9781509536474". Psychosis. 15 (1): 118–119. doi:10.1080/17522439.2022.2164344.
- Rembis, Michael (Summer 2023). "Schizophrenia: An Unfinished History, Orna Ophir, Polity, 2022. 224 pp. $42 (cloth). ISBN 9781509536474". Book Review. Journal of the History of the Behavioral Sciences. 59 (3): 346–348. doi:10.1002/jhbs.22249.
- Sullum, Jacob (January 2023). "Psychiatrists Do Not Know What They Are Treating". Books. Reason. Vol. 54, no. 8. pp. 54–56. ProQuest 2737499931. Archived from the original on August 21, 2024.
