= Mental illness in ancient Greece =

Mental illness was an issue that many faced in ancient times much like in the modern world. In ancient Greece, many were divided over what they believed to be the cause of the illness that a patient faced. According to James Longrigg in his book Greek Medicine From the Heroic to the Hellenistic Age, many believed that mental illness was a direct response from the angry gods. According to Longrigg, the only way to fight this illness was to appease the gods. By doing so, it would ultimately rid the person of the demon that was ailing them. This led to many variations of treatment ranging from prayer to surgery to sacrifice. It is only through centuries of understanding as well as modern technology that we are now able to diagnose and treat those afflicted properly.

== Treatment ==
Treatment of mental illness in ancient Greece was a new and experimental process due to the lack of modern-day tools and technology that allow doctors to identify these mental ailments. Some ancient physicians didn't understand what part of the body was responsible for the strange behavior and turned to prayer and forgiveness from the gods. However, most physicians understood mental illness was often caused by physical ailments such as an imbalance of the humors.

Hippocrates was a physician who believed that the brain was the center of thought, intelligence, and emotion. Because of this, he and many others came to the conclusion that mental disorders came from problems with the brain. As time went on and physicians began to better understand mental illness they began to treat patients in different ways. "They were mostly (not entirely) concerned with psychoses (externalizing disorders such as antisocial personality disorder and drug and alcohol use disorders) rather than neuroses (internalizing disorders such as depression and anxiety), and they took into account a full range of hard-to-define symptoms including inappropriate behavior in public, delusions, delirium, and hallucinations. Treatments also covered a whole range from physical restraint to counseling; they did not make much use of pharmaceuticals."

== Role of religion and superstitions ==
Treatment of mental illness in ancient times was often linked to religion. Hippocrates was one of the leading faces when battling with mental illness, and it is mentioned in the textbook Religion and Philosophy: Belief and Knowledge in the Classical Age, his strong belief in the gods and the power they hold in being able to heal and help people. Doctors who were trained by Hippocrates were to take an oath that stated, "I swear by Apollo, the healer, Asklepios, Hygieis and Panacia, and I take witness all the gods, all the goddesses, to keep according to my ability and my judgement, the following oath and agreement.." Many times as a result of people's heavy religious beliefs and lack of knowledge, people who were stricken with madness were believed to be punished by the gods or possessed by demons. There are claims in the Old Testament of possession and madness cast upon people by god, these, in reality, may actually have been cases of mental illnesses that alter behavior such as schizophrenia, bipolar disorder or dissociative identity disorder. To people who had never encountered these diseases, it would have been difficult to diagnose and identify the disease in a logical way backed by hard evidence because there was likely no evidence to refer to. Due to this lack of evidence and logic, many treatments were designed to help clear the body of any spirits that may have taken over the patient’s body. “Archaeologists have unearthed skulls datable back to at least 5000 BCE which have been trephined or trepanned—small round holes have been bored in them with flint tools. The subject was probably thought to be possessed by devils which the holes would allow to escape.”

== Mental illness in society ==
As in the modern age, there was a social stigma attached to those who were suffering from mental illness. "The ancient Greeks first gave voice to the concept of stigma noting that those who were marked with mental illness were often shunned, locked up, or on rare occasions put to death." People with diseases that altered behavior were often shunned and feared by those around them. This had to do with the fear of that which was not understood. Many thought the gods were angry at the affected individual and that they would receive a similar fate through association. The afflicted were also confined so that they would not cause injury to themselves, others, or damage to property. Plato once wrote “If a man is mad, he shall not be at large in the city, but his family shall keep him in any way they can.” In ancient Greece, it was up to the family of the ill to keep them in check as well as prevent them from disturbing the peace. Depending on the severity of the affliction, patients were either allowed to roam aimlessly through the city or forced to completely remain indoors.
