= Self-destructive behavior =

Behaviours that are harmful to the individual engaging in them

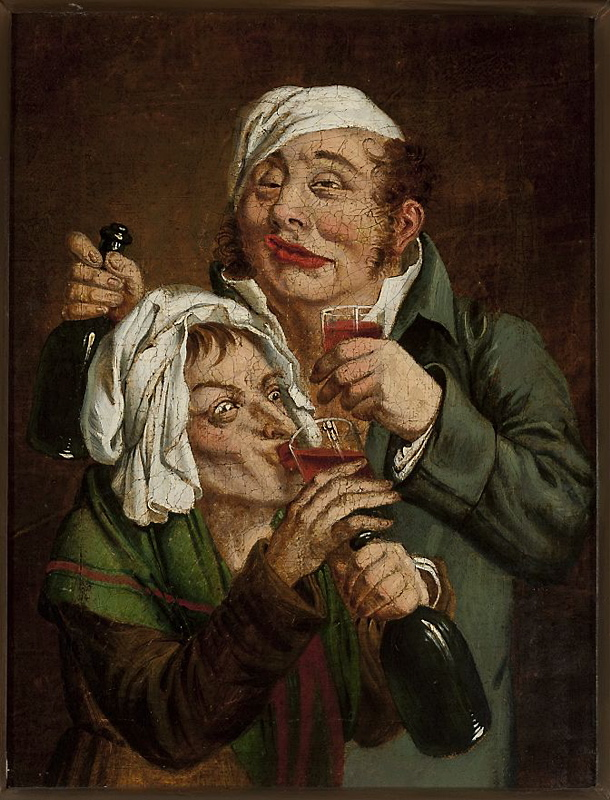
Jan Feliks Piwarski’s depiction of alcoholism, a self-destructive behavior

Self-destructive behavior is any behavior that is harmful or potentially harmful towards the person who engages in the behavior.

Self-destructive behaviors are considered to be on a continuum, with one extreme end of the scale being suicide. Self-destructive actions may be deliberate, born of impulse, or developed as a habit. The term however tends to be applied toward self-destruction that either is fatal, or is potentially habit-forming or addictive and thus potentially fatal. According to the Catholic Church it is also applied to the potential at a communal or global level for the entire human race to destroy itself through the technological choices made by society and their possible consequences.

Individual self-destructive behavior is often associated with neurodevelopmental or mental disorders such as attention deficit hyperactivity disorder, borderline personality disorder or schizophrenia.

== Origin ==
Self-destructive behavior was first studied in 1895 by Sigmund Freud and Sándor Ferenczi when they first recognized how psychological trauma affected the development of children. Freud and Ferenczi noticed that children who were raised in an unhealthy environment were more often the ones to act out and take part in self-destructive behavior.

Freud concluded that self-destructive behavior is influenced by one's ego or superego and aggression. Depending on how strongly influenced one is, it will increase the intensity of one's destructive behavior. Guilt is a leading factor for one's superego. For instance, growing up with alcoholic parents can increase one's self-destructive behavior because they feel guilty that they did not provide them with the help they needed. Since they failed to help their parents overcome these obstacles, they feel as if their parents failed because of them. Hence they then use harming themselves as a coping mechanism for their guilt and failure.

Freud additionally states that the aggression in self-destructive behavior is influenced by a personal motive. Just as cultural and environmental factors can play an important role of this, social factors can as well. For example, if a child were bullied all through middle school, one way for them to deal with their pain would be to exhibit self-destructive behavior such as self-harm.

With investigations Freud and Ferenczi formed a hypothesis that people with self-destructive behavior suffer from "forbidden fantasies, not memories", meaning that since the action isn't supposed to be done, self-destructive people get a stronger drive to take part in these actions.

Self-destructive behavior varies from person to person, therefore superego and aggression is different in every person.

== Forms ==
Self-destructive behavior may be used as a coping mechanism when one is overwhelmed. For example, faced with a pressing scholastic assessment, someone may choose to sabotage their work rather than cope with the stress. This would make submission of (or passing) the assessment impossible, but remove the worry associated with it.

Self-destructive behavior may also manifest itself in an active attempt to drive away other people. For example, they may fear that they will "mess up" a relationship. Rather than deal with this fear, socially self-destructive individuals engage in annoying or alienating behavior such that others shall reject them first.

Self-destructive behavior is often considered to be synonymous with self-harm, but this is not accurate. Self-harm is an extreme form of self-destructive behavior, but it may appear in many other guises. More forms of self-destruction are eating disorders, alcoholism, drug addictions, gambling addictions and suicide attempts.

An important aspect of self-destructive behavior is the inability to handle the stress stemming from an individual's lack of self-confidence –for example in a relationship, as to whether the other person is truly faithful ("How can they love someone like me?"), or at work or school, as to whether the realization of assignments and deadlines is possible ("There is no way I can complete all my work on time"). Self-destructive people usually lack healthier coping mechanisms, such as asserting personal boundaries. Hence incompetence is the only apparent way to disentangle themselves from demands.

Successful individuals may self-destructively sabotage their own achievements; this may stem from a feeling of anxiety, unworthiness, or from an impulsive desire to repeat the "climb to the top".

== Causes ==
Childhood trauma via sexual, emotional and physical abuse, as well as disrupted parental care, have been linked with self-destructive behavior. Usually, behavior like this results from the lack of realization of healthy coping mechanisms. Because there is not a lot of focus on specific mental health problems, such as self-destructive behavior, people are not being educated on specific ways that could benefit or even prevent these people from acting out, leading to self-destructive actions.

According to the findings of a clinical research study, while a lack of stable relationships facilitates self-destructive actions, childhood trauma leads to its beginning and everlasting effects. Moreover, individuals who often attempt suicide or self-harm are more likely to experience flashbacks to childhood abuse, mistreatment, and rejection while they are under stress. Also, dissociative episodes and self-destructive actions may be triggered by situations involving psychological safety, rage, and emotional needs.

Additionally, people who have experienced some form of trauma, such as abuse or neglect, can develop psychological issues that can lead to bigger problems. Aside from this, a need for attention or a feel good sensation and destructiveness can ultimately cause this behavior. A prime example of this would be addiction to drugs or alcohol. In the beginning stages, people have the tendency to ease their way into these unhealthy behaviors because it gives them a pleasurable sensation. However, as time goes on, it becomes a habit that they can not stop and they begin to lose these great feelings easily. When these feelings stop, self-destructive behavior enhances because they are not able to provide themselves with that feeling that makes mental or physical pain go away.

== Treatment ==
Changing one's self-destructive behavior can be difficult, and may include major stages that one passes through on the way to recovery. The stages founded by Prochaska and DiClemente (1982) included precontemplation, contemplation, preparation, action, maintenance, and termination. For body-focused repetitive behaviors, such as trichotillomania and nail-biting, habit reversal training and decoupling are effective according to meta-analytic evidence. A 2021 study stated that Nuclei accumbens stimulation could be a successful treatment for aggressive and self-destructive behaviors, separate from the triggers.

== See also ==
- 27 Club
- Anti-social behaviour
- Antisocial personality disorder
- Cupio dissolvi
- Death drive
- Borderline personality disorder
- Emotional self-regulation
- Histrionic personality disorder
- Post-traumatic stress disorder
- Self-defeating personality disorder
- Self-sabotage
- Self-harm
- Self-neglect
