= Self-harm =

Intentional injury to one's body

- Other names: Deliberate self-harm (DSH), self-injury (SI), nonsuicidal self-injury (NSSI)
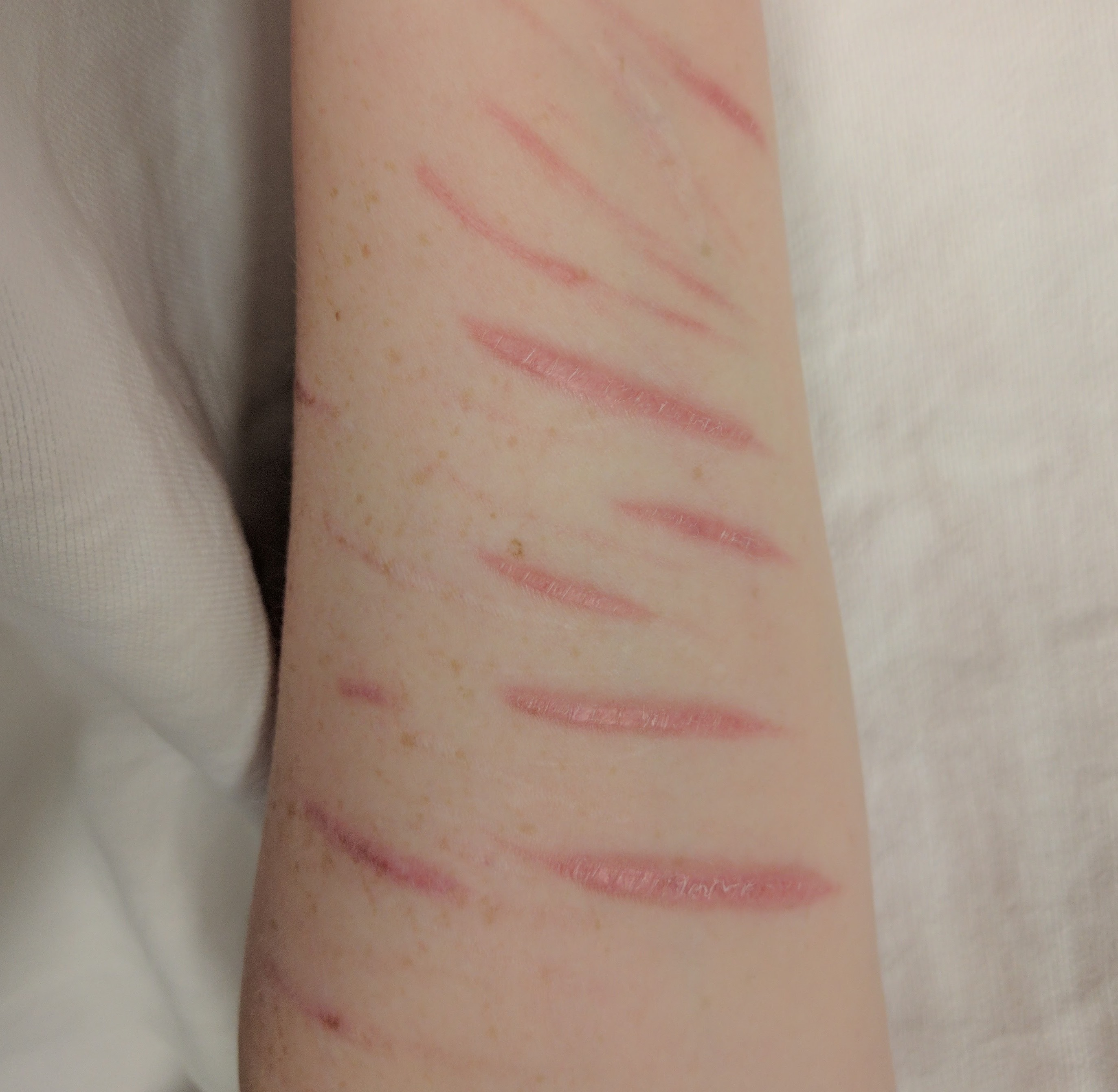
- Healed scars on the forearm from self-harm
- Specialty: Psychiatry, surgery, or emergency medicine if serious injuries occur
- Causes: Mental disorders, psychological factors, genetics, drug and alcohol usage

Self-harm is intentional behavior that causes harm to oneself. This is most commonly regarded as direct injury of one's own tissues, usually without suicidal intention. Other terms such as cutting, burning, self-abuse, self-injury, and self-mutilation have been used for any self-harming behavior regardless of suicidal intent. Common forms of self-harm include damaging the skin with a sharp object or scratching with the fingernails, hitting, or burning. The exact bounds of self-harm are imprecise, but generally exclude tissue damage that occurs as an unintended side-effect of eating disorders or substance abuse, as well as more societally acceptable body modification, such as tattoos and piercings.

Although self-harm is by definition non-suicidal, it may still be life-threatening. People who do self-harm are more likely to die by suicide, and 40–60% of people who die by suicide have previously self-harmed. Still, only a minority of those who self-harm are suicidal.

The desire to self-harm is a common symptom of some personality disorders. People with other mental disorders may also self-harm. Studies also provide strong support for a self-punishment function, and modest evidence for anti-dissociation, interpersonal-influence, anti-suicide, sensation-seeking, and interpersonal boundaries functions. Self-harm can also occur in high-functioning individuals who have no underlying mental health diagnosis. The motivations for self-harm vary; some use it as a coping mechanism to provide temporary relief of intense feelings such as anxiety, depression, stress, emotional numbness, or a sense of failure. Self-harm is often associated with a history of trauma, including emotional and sexual abuse.

There are a number of different methods that can be used to treat self-harm, which concentrate on either treating the underlying causes, or on treating the behavior itself. Other approaches involve avoidance techniques, which focus on keeping the individual occupied with other activities, or replacing the act of self-harm with safer methods that do not lead to permanent damage.

Self-harm tends to begin in adolescence. Self-harm in childhood is relatively rare, but the rate has been increasing since the 1980s. Self-harm can also occur in the elderly population. The risk of serious injury and suicide is higher in older people who self-harm. Captive animals, such as birds and monkeys, are also known to harm themselves.

== Classification ==
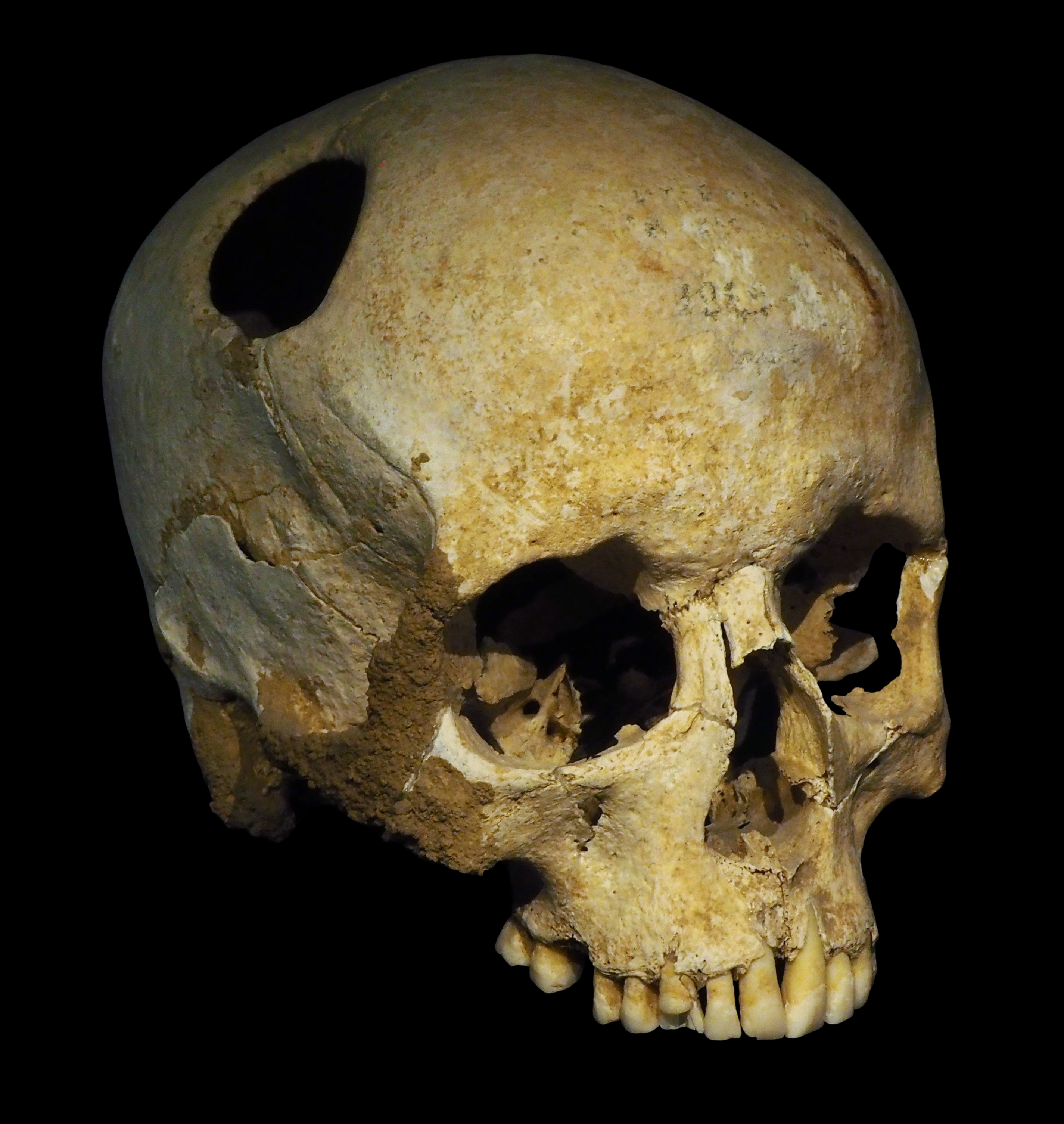
Armando R. Favazza cites prehistoric trepanation as evidence of self-mutilation's longstanding use in healing rituals. He and other authorities contrast such culturally-sanctioned practices with pathological self-harm.

Although the 20th-century psychiatrist Karl Menninger is often credited with the initial clinical characterization of self-harm, self-harm is not a new phenomenon. There is frequent reference in 19th-century clinical literature and asylum records which make a clear clinical distinction between self-harm with and without suicidal intent. This differentiation may have been important to both safeguard the reputations of asylums against accusations of medical neglect and to protect patients and their families from the legal or religious consequences of a suicide attempt. In 1896, the American ophthalmologists George Gould and Walter Pyle categorized self-mutilation cases into three groups: those resulting from "temporary insanity from hallucinations or melancholia; with suicidal intent; and in a religious frenzy or emotion".

Menninger considered self-mutilation as a non-fatal expression of an attenuated death wish and thus coined the term partial suicide. He began a classification system of six types:

1. neurotic – nail-biters, pickers, extreme hair removal, and unnecessary cosmetic surgery
2. religious – self-flagellants and others
3. puberty rites – hymen removal, circumcision, or clitoral alteration
4. psychotic – eye or ear removal, genital self-mutilation, and extreme amputation
5. organic brain diseases – which allow repetitive head-banging, hand-biting, finger-fracturing, or eye removal
6. conventional – nail-clipping, trimming of hair, and shaving beards.

Pao differentiated between delicate (low lethality) and coarse (high lethality) self-mutilators who cut. The "delicate" cutters were young, multiple episodic of superficial cuts and generally had borderline personality disorder diagnosis. The "coarse" cutters were older and generally psychotic. Ross and McKay (1979) categorized self-mutilators into nine groups: cutting, biting, abrading, severing, inserting, burning, ingesting or inhaling, hitting, and constricting.

After the 1970s the focus of self-harm shifted from Freudian psycho-sexual drives of the patients.

Walsh and Rosen created four categories numbered by Roman numerals I–IV, defining Self-mutilation as rows II, III and IV.

Classification	Examples of behavior	Degree of physical damage	Psychological state	Social acceptability
I	Ear-piercing, nail-biting, small tattoos, cosmetic surgery (not considered self-harm by the majority of the population)	Superficial to mild	Benign	Mostly accepted
II	Piercings, saber scars, ritualistic clan scarring, sailor tattoos, gang tattoos, minor wound-excoriation, trichotillomania	Mild to moderate	Benign to agitated	Subculture acceptance
III	Wrist- or body-cutting, self-inflicted cigarette burns and tattoos, major wound-excoriation	Mild to moderate	Psychic crisis	Possibly accepted by a handful of similar-minded friends but not by the general population
IV	Auto-castration, self-enucleation, amputation	Severe	Psychotic decompensation	Unacceptable

Favazza and Rosenthal reviewed hundreds of studies and divided self-mutilation into two categories: culturally sanctioned self-mutilation and deviant self-mutilation. Favazza also created two subcategories of sanctioned self-mutilations; rituals and practices. The rituals are mutilations repeated generationally and reflect a society's traditions, symbolism and beliefs. Practices "imply activities that may be faddish and that often hold little underlying significance" such as piercing of earlobes, nose, eyebrows as well as male circumcision while deviant self-mutilation is equivalent to self-harm.

== Terminology ==
Self-harm (SH), self-injury (SI), nonsuicidal self-injury (NSSI) and self-injurious behavior (SIB) are different terms to describe tissue damage that is performed intentionally and usually without suicidal intent. The adjective "deliberate" is sometimes used, although this has become less common, as some view it as presumptuous or judgmental. Less common or more dated terms include parasuicidal behavior, self-mutilation, self-destructive behavior, self-inflicted violence, self-injurious behavior, and self-abuse. Others use the phrase self-soothing as intentionally positive terminology to counter more negative associations. Self-inflicted wound or self-inflicted injury refers to a broader range of circumstances, including wounds that result from organic brain syndromes, substance abuse, and autoeroticism.

Different sources draw various distinctions between some of these terms. Some sources define self-harm more broadly than self-injury, such as to include drug overdose, eating disorders, and other acts that do not directly lead to visible injuries. Others explicitly exclude these. Some sources, particularly in the United Kingdom, define deliberate self-harm or self-harm in general to include suicidal acts. (This article principally discusses non-suicidal acts of self-inflicted skin damage or self-poisoning.) The inconsistent definitions used for self-harm have made research more difficult.

Nonsuicidal self-injury (NSSI) is listed in Section II (Diagnostic criteria and codes) of the latest, as of April 2025, edition of the Diagnostic and Statistical Manual of Mental Disorders (DSM-5-TR) under the category "other conditions that may be a focus of clinical attention". While NSSI is not a separate mental disorder, the DSM-5-TR adds a diagnostic code for the condition in-line with the ICD. The disorder is defined as intentional self-inflicted injury without the intent of dying by suicide. Section III (Emerging measures and models) of the previous edition of the DSM (DSM-5) contains the proposed diagnosis along with criteria and description of Nonsuicidal Self-injury. Criteria for NSSI include five or more days of self-inflicted harm over the course of one year without suicidal intent, and the individual must have been motivated by seeking relief from a negative state, resolving an interpersonal difficulty, or achieving a positive state.

People who self-harm are not usually seeking to end their own life; it has been suggested instead that they are using self-harm as a coping mechanism to relieve emotional pain or discomfort or as an attempt to communicate distress.

== Concealment ==
A common practice in those who self-harm is that of concealment. Concealment is the process of hiding one's self-harm scars or wounds via methods such as wearing concealing attire, harming in less perceived places such as the thighs, applying makeup, or receiving plastic surgery or tattoos. There are many reasons a person may choose to conceal, the most common of which is caused by the stigma around self-harm. Individuals who choose to conceal often believe their scars to be socially detrimental or that people may perceive them to be seeking attention. Some individuals may also wish to conceal their scars from themselves, due to a sense of shame or belief it makes them weak.

Not all people who engage in self-harm wish to conceal their wounds and may be indifferent to or in some cases have a desire for them to be seen. Some people who self-harm do so to exert interpersonal influence, validation, belonging, protection or punishment; in cases like these, people may not wish to conceal their scars or wounds either from themselves or others, believing they will gain approval, cause disgust or instill fear in others.

== Signs and symptoms ==
The most common form of self-harm for adolescents, according to studies conducted in six countries, is stabbing or cutting the skin with a sharp object. For adults ages 60 and over, self-poisoning (including intentional drug overdose) is by far the most common form. Other self-harm methods include burning, head-banging, biting, scratching, hitting, preventing wounds from healing, self-embedding of objects, and hair-pulling. The locations of self-harm are often areas of the body that are easily hidden and concealed from the sight of others, most commonly being the forearms, thighs or torso.

== Causes ==
=== Mental disorder ===
Although some people who self-harm do not have any form of recognized mental disorder, self-harm often co-occurs with psychiatric conditions. Self-harm is, for example, associated with eating disorders, autism, borderline personality disorder, body dysmorphic disorder, dissociative disorders, bipolar disorder, depression, phobias, and conduct disorders. As many as 70% of individuals with borderline personality disorder engage in self-harm. An estimated 30% of autistic individuals engage in self-harm at some point, including eye-poking, skin-picking, hand-biting, and head-banging. According to a meta-analysis that did not distinguish between suicidal and non-suicidal acts, self-harm is common among those with schizophrenia and is a significant predictor of suicide. There are parallels between self-harm and factitious disorder, a psychiatric disorder in which individuals feign illness or trauma. There may be a common ground of inner distress culminating in self-directed harm in patients with this condition. However, a desire to deceive medical personnel in order to gain treatment and attention is more important in factitious disorder than in self-harm.

=== Psychological factors ===
Self-harm is frequently described as an experience of depersonalization or a dissociative state. Abuse during childhood is accepted as a primary social factor increasing the incidence of self-harm, as is bereavement, and troubled parental or partner relationships. Factors such as war, poverty, unemployment, and substance abuse may also contribute. Other predictors of self-harm and suicidal behavior include feelings of entrapment, defeat, lack of belonging, and perceiving oneself as a burden along with having an impulsive personality and/or less effective social problem-solving skills. Two studies have indicated that self-harm correlates more with pubertal phase, particularly the end of puberty (peaking around 15 for girls), rather than with age. Adolescents may be more vulnerable neurodevelopmentally in this time, and more vulnerable to social pressures, with depression, alcohol abuse, and sexual activity as independent contributing factors. Transgender adolescents are significantly more likely to engage in self-harm than their cisgender peers. This can be attributed to distress caused by gender dysphoria as well as increased likelihoods of experiencing bullying, abuse, and mental illness.

=== Genetics ===
The most distinctive characteristic of the rare genetic condition Lesch–Nyhan syndrome is uncontrollable self-harm and self-mutilation, and may include biting (particularly of the skin, nails, and lips) and head-banging. Genetics may contribute to the risk of developing other psychological conditions, such as anxiety or depression, which could in turn lead to self-harming behavior. However, the link between genetics and self-harm in otherwise healthy patients is largely inconclusive.

=== Drugs and alcohol ===
Substance misuse, dependence and withdrawal are associated with self-harm. Benzodiazepine dependence as well as benzodiazepine withdrawal is associated with self-harming behavior in young people. Alcohol is a major risk factor for self-harm. A study which analyzed self-harm presentations to emergency rooms in Northern Ireland found that alcohol was a major contributing factor and involved in 63.8% of self-harm presentations. A 2009 study in the relation between cannabis use and deliberate self-harm (DSH) in Norway and England found that, in general, cannabis use may not be a specific risk factor for DSH in young adolescents. Smoking has also been associated with both non-suicidal self injury and suicide attempts in adolescents, although the nature of the relationship is unclear. A 2021 meta-analysis on literature concerning the association between cannabis use and self-injurious behaviors has defined the extent of this association, which is significant both at the cross-sectional (odds ratio = 1.569, 95% confidence interval [1.167-2.108]) and longitudinal (odds ratio = 2.569, 95% confidence interval [2.207-3.256]) levels, and highlighting the role of the chronic use of the substance, and the presence of depressive symptoms or of mental disorders as factors that might increase the risk of self-injury among cannabis users.

== Pathophysiology ==
A flow chart of two theories of self-harm

Self-injury may result in serious injury and scarring. While non-suicidal self-injury by definition lacks suicidal intent, it may nonetheless result in accidental death.

While the motivations for self-harm vary, the most commonly endorsed reason for self-harm given by adolescents is to get relief from a terrible state of mind. Young people with a history of repeated episodes of self-harm are more likely to self-harm into adulthood, and are at higher risk of suicide. In older adults, influenced by a combination of interconnected individual, societal, and healthcare factors, including financial and interpersonal problems and comorbid physical conditions and pain, with increased loneliness, perceived burdensomeness of ageing, and loss of control reported as particular motivations. There is a positive statistical correlation between self-harm and physical, sexual, and emotional abuse. Self-harm may become a means of managing and controlling pain, in contrast to the pain experienced earlier in the person's life over which they had no control (e.g., through abuse).

Assessment of motives in a medical setting is usually based on precursors to the incident, circumstances, and information from the patient. However, limited studies show that professional assessments tend to suggest more manipulative or punitive motives than the patient's own statements.

A UK Office for National Statistics study reported only two motives: "to draw attention" and "because of anger". For some people, harming themselves can be a means of drawing attention to the need for help and to ask for assistance in an indirect way. It may also be an attempt to affect others and to manipulate them in some way emotionally. However, those with chronic, repetitive self-harm often do not want attention and hide their scars carefully from themselves, or others.

Many people who self-harm state that it allows them to "go away" or dissociate, separating the mind from feelings that are causing anguish. This may be achieved by tricking the mind into believing that the present suffering being felt is caused by the self-harm instead of the issues they were facing previously: the physical pain therefore acts as a distraction from the original emotional pain. Evidence suggests self harm may also be used to end a state of dissociation.

Alternatively, self-harm may be a means of feeling something, even if the sensation is unpleasant and painful. Those who self-harm sometimes describe feelings of emptiness or numbness (anhedonia), and physical pain may be a relief from these feelings.

Those who self-harm may experience a primarily psychological relief; however, there is evidence that shows that for those who engage in chronic self-harm, this feeling of relief can come from the beta endorphins released in the brain. Endorphins are endogenous opioids that are released in response to physical injury, acting as natural painkillers and inducing pleasant feelings, and in response to self-harm would act to reduce tension and emotional distress. Many people do not feel physical pain when self-harming. Studies of clinical and non-clinical populations suggest that people who engage in self-harm have higher pain thresholds and tolerance in general, although a 2016 review characterized the evidence base as "greatly limited". There is no consensus as to the reason for this apparent phenomenon.

As a coping mechanism, self-harm can become psychologically addictive because, to the individual experiencing self-harm, it works; it enables them to deal with intense stress in the current moment. The patterns sometimes created by it, such as specific time intervals between acts of self-harm, can also create a behavioral pattern that can result in a wanting or craving to fulfill thoughts of self-harm.

=== Autonomic nervous system ===
Emotional pain activates the same regions of the brain as physical pain, so emotional stress can be a significantly intolerable state for some people. Some of this is environmental and some of this is due to physiological differences in responding. The autonomic nervous system is composed of two components: the sympathetic nervous system controls arousal and physical activation (e.g., the fight-or-flight response) and the parasympathetic nervous system controls physical processes that are automatic (e.g., saliva production). The sympathetic nervous system innervates (e.g., is physically connected to and regulates) many parts of the body involved in stress responses. Studies of adolescents have shown that adolescents who self-injure have greater physiological reactivity (e.g., skin conductance) to stress than adolescents who do not self-injure.

== Treatment ==
Several forms of psychosocial treatments can be used in self-harm including dialectical behavior therapy. Psychiatric and personality disorders are common in individuals who self-harm and as a result self-harm may be an indicator of depression and/or other psychological problems. As of 2021, there is little or no evidence that antidepressants, mood stabilizers, or dietary supplements reduce repetition of self-harm. In limited research into antipsychotics, one small trial of flupentixol found a possible reduction in repetition, while one small trial of fluphenazine found no difference between low and ultra-low doses. As of 2012, no clinical trials have evaluated the effects of pharmacotherapy on adolescents who self-harm.

Emergency departments are often the first point of contact with healthcare for people who self-harm. As such they are crucial in supporting them and can play a role in preventing suicide. At the same time, according to a study conducted in England, people who self-harm often experience that they do not receive meaningful care at the emergency department. Both people who self-harm and staff in the study highlighted the failure of the healthcare system to support, the lack of specialist care. People who self-harm in the study often felt shame or being judged due to their condition, and said that being listened to and validated gave them hope. At the same time staff experienced frustration from being powerless to help and were afraid of being blamed if someone died by suicide.

There are also difficulties in meeting the need of patients that self-harm in mental healthcare. Studies have shown that staff found the care for people who self-harm emotionally challenging and they experienced an overwhelming responsibility in preventing the patients from self-harming and the care focuses mainly on maintaining the safety for the patients, for example by removing dangerous items or physical restraint, even if it is believed to be ineffective. A French ethnographic study has found out that regular staff meetings for caregivers but also for parents dealing with adolescents who self-harm were especially efficient to diminish guilt and powerless feelings, as well as violent reactions denounced by those who self-harm.

=== Therapy ===
A meta-analysis from Cochrane in 2016 found low-quality evidence suggesting that CBT-based psychotherapy can reduce the number of adults repeating self-harm. For those with repeated self-harm or probable personality disorder, group-based emotion-regulation psychotherapy, mentalization, and DBT showed promise in reducing repetition or frequency of self-harm, though the evidence quality varied from low to moderate. This meta-analysis was repeated again in 2021, and found uncertain evidence for many psychosocial interventions in reducing self-harm repetition in adults, noting significant methodological limitations across studies. While CBT-based therapies might reduce repetition at longer follow-ups (however with low certainty of evidence), MBT and group-based emotion regulation therapy showed promise in single or related trials, warranting further research.

Dialectical behavior therapy for adolescents (DBT-A) is a well-established treatment for self-injurious behavior in youth and is probably useful for decreasing the risk of non-suicidal self-injury. Several other treatments including integrated CBT (I-CBT), attachment-based family therapy (ABFT), resourceful adolescent parent program (RAP-P), intensive interpersonal psychotherapy for adolescents (IPT-A-IN), mentalization-based treatment for adolescents (MBT-A), and integrated family therapy are probably efficacious. Cognitive behavioral therapy may also be used to assist those with Axis I diagnoses, such as depression, schizophrenia, and bipolar disorder. Dialectical behavior therapy (DBT) can be successful for those individuals exhibiting a personality disorder, and could potentially be used for those with other mental disorders who exhibit self-harming behavior. Diagnosis and treatment of the causes of self-harm is thought by many to be the best approach to treating self-harm. In adolescents multisystem therapy shows promise. According to the classification of Walsh and Rosen trichotillomania and nail biting represent class I and II self-mutilation behavior (see classification section in this article); for these conditions habit reversal training and decoupling have been found effective according to meta-analytic evidence.

A meta-analysis found that psychological therapy is effective in reducing self-harm. The proportion of the adolescents who engaged in self-harm over the follow-up period was lower in the intervention groups (28%) than in controls (33%). Psychological therapies with the largest effect sizes were dialectical behavior therapy (DBT), cognitive-behavioral therapy (CBT), and mentalization-based therapy (MBT).

=== Avoidance techniques ===
Generating alternative behaviors that the person can engage in instead of self-harm is one successful behavioral method that is employed to avoid self-harm. Techniques, aimed at keeping busy, may include journaling, taking a walk, participating in sports or exercise or being around friends when the person has the urge to harm themselves. The removal of objects used for self-harm from easy reach is also helpful for resisting self-harming urges. The provision of a card that allows the person to make emergency contact with counselling services should the urge to self-harm arise may also help prevent the act of self-harm. Some providers may recommend harm-reduction techniques such as snapping of a rubber band on the wrist, but there is no consensus as to the efficacy of this approach.

== Epidemiology ==
Deaths from self-harm per million people in 2012 no data 3–23 24–32 33–49 50–61 62–76 77–95 96–121 122–146 147–193 194–395

World-map showing the disability-adjusted life year, which is a measure of each country's disease burden, for self-inflicted injuries per 100,000 inhabitants in 2004 no data less than 80 80–159 160–239 240–319 320–399 400–479 480–559 560–639 640–719 720–799 800–850 more than 850

It is difficult to gain an accurate picture of incidence and prevalence of self-harm. Even with sufficient monitoring resources, self-harm is usually unreported, with instances taking place in private and wounds being treated by the self-harming individual. Recorded figures can be based on three sources: psychiatric samples, hospital admissions and general population surveys. A 2015 meta-analysis of reported self-harm among 600,000 adolescents found a lifetime prevalence of 11.4% for suicidal or non-suicidal self-harm (i.e. excluding self-poisoning) and 22.9% for non-suicidal self-injury (i.e. excluding suicidal acts), for an overall prevalence of 16.9%. The difference in SH and NSSI rates, compared to figures of 16.1% and 18.0% found in a 2012 review, may be attributable to differences in methodology among the studies analyzed.

The World Health Organization estimates that, as of 2010, 880,000 deaths occur as a result of self-harm (including suicides). About 10% of admissions to medical wards in the UK are as a result of self-harm, the majority of which are drug overdoses. However, studies based only on hospital admissions may hide the larger group of individuals who self-harm who do not need or seek hospital treatment for their injuries, instead treating themselves. Many adolescents who present to general hospitals with deliberate self-harm report previous episodes for which they did not receive medical attention. In the United States up to 4% of adults self-harm with approximately 1% of the population engaging in chronic or severe self-harm.

The onset of self-harm tends to occur around puberty, although scholarship is divided as to whether this is usually before puberty or later in adolescence. Meta-analyses have not supported some studies' conclusion that self-harm rates are increasing among adolescents. It is generally thought that self-harm rates increase over the course of adolescence, although this has not been studied thoroughly. The earliest reported incidents of self-harm are in children between 5 and 7 years old. In addition there appears to be an increased risk of self-harm in college students than among the general population. In a study of undergraduate students in the US, 9.8% of the students surveyed indicated that they had purposefully cut or burned themselves on at least one occasion in the past. When the definition of self-harm was expanded to include head-banging, scratching oneself, and hitting oneself along with cutting and burning, 32% of the sample said they had done this. At least one in ten Chinese college students experience self-harm; in 2019, intentional self-harm and sequelae were the third and second leading causes of death among adolescents aged 15 to 19 years and 20 to 24 years in the country. In Ireland, a study found that instances of hospital-treated self-harm were much higher in city and urban districts, than in rural settings. The CASE (Child & Adolescent Self-harm in Europe) study suggests that the life-time risk of self-injury is ~1:7 for women and ~1:25 for men.

=== Gender differences ===
Aggregated research has found no difference in the prevalence of self-harm between men and women. This contrasts with previous studies, which suggested that up to four times as many females as males have direct experience of self-harm, which many had argued was rather the result of data collection biases.

The WHO/EURO Multicentre Study of Suicide, established in 1989, demonstrated that, for each age group, the female rate of self-harm exceeded that of the males, with the highest rate among females in the 13–24 age group and the highest rate among males in the 12–34 age group. However, this discrepancy has been known to vary significantly depending upon population and methodological criteria, consistent with wide-ranging uncertainties in gathering and interpreting data regarding rates of self-harm in general. Such problems have sometimes been the focus of criticism in the context of broader psychosocial interpretation. For example, feminist author Barbara Brickman has speculated that reported gender differences in rates of self-harm are due to deliberate socially biased methodological and sampling errors, directly blaming medical discourse for pathologising the female. Analyzing 70 most-cited articles in the psychiatrists and psychoanalytics journals in 2020, the psychologist Adrien Cascarino found out that one of the reason for this bias was the belief that most of the people self-harm because they have been sexually abused during their childhood (and were therefore mostly women), while this belief has been proven wrong by a meta-analysis.

This gender discrepancy is often distorted in specific populations where rates of self-harm are inordinately high, which may have implications on the significance and interpretation of psychosocial factors other than gender. A study in 2003 found an extremely high prevalence of self-harm among 428 homeless and runaway youths (aged 16–19) with 72% of males and 66% of females reporting a history of self-harm. However, in 2008, a study of young people and self-harm saw the gender gap widen in the opposite direction, with 32% of young females, and 22% of young males reporting self-harm. Studies also indicate that males who self-harm may also be at a greater risk of completing suicide.

There does not appear to be a difference in motivation for self-harm in adolescent males and females. Triggering factors such as low self-esteem and having friends and family members who self-harm are also common between both males and females. One limited study found that, among those young individuals who do self-harm, both genders are just as equally likely to use the method of skin-cutting. However, females who self-cut are more likely than males to explain their self-harm episode by saying that they had wanted to punish themselves. In New Zealand, more females are hospitalized for intentional self-harm than males. Females more commonly choose methods such as self-poisoning that generally are not fatal, but still serious enough to require hospitalization.

=== Elderly ===
In a study of a district general hospital in the UK, 5.4% of all the hospital's self-harm cases were aged over 65. The male to female ratio was 2:3, although the self-harm rates for males and females over 65 in the local population were identical. Over 90% had depressive conditions, and 63% had significant physical illness. Under 10% of the patients gave a prior history of earlier self-harm, while both the repetition and suicide rates were very low, which could be explained by the absence of factors known to be associated with repetition, such as personality disorder and alcohol abuse. However, NICE Guidance on Self-harm in the UK suggests that older people who self-harm are at a greater risk of completing suicide, with 1 in 5 older people who self-harm going on to end their life. A study completed in Ireland showed that older Irish adults have high rates of deliberate self-harm, but comparatively low rates of suicide.

=== Developing world ===
Only recently have attempts to improve health in the developing world concentrated on not only physical illness but also mental health. Deliberate self-harm is common in the developing world. Research into self-harm in these areas is however, still very limited. Though an important case study is that of Sri Lanka, which is a country exhibiting a high incidence of suicide and self-poisoning with agricultural pesticides or natural poisons. Many people admitted for deliberate self-poisoning during a study by Eddleston et al. were young and few expressed a desire to die, but death was relatively common in the young in these cases. The improvement of medical management of acute poisoning in the developing world is poor and improvements are required in order to reduce mortality.

Some of the causes of deliberate self-poisoning in Sri Lankan adolescents included bereavement and harsh discipline by parents. The coping mechanisms are being spread in local communities as people are surrounded by others who have previously deliberately harmed themselves or attempted suicide. One way to reduce self-harm would be to limit access to poisons; however many cases involve pesticides or yellow oleander seeds, and the reduction of access to these agents would be difficult. Great potential for the reduction of self-harm lies in education and prevention, but limited resources in the developing world ultimately make these methods challenging.

=== Prison inmates ===
Deliberate self-harm is especially prevalent in prison populations. A proposed explanation for this is that prisons are often violent places, and prisoners who wish to avoid physical confrontations may resort to self-harm as a ruse, either to convince other prisoners that they are dangerously insane and resilient to pain or to obtain protection from the prison authorities. Prisoners are sometimes placed in solitary confinement cells under protective custody to prevent them from harming themselves. Self-harm also occurs frequently in inmates who are placed in solitary confinement.

== Awareness ==
There are many movements among the general self-harm community to make self-harm itself and treatment better known to mental health professionals, as well as the general public. For example, March 1 is designated as Self-injury Awareness Day (SIAD) around the world. On this day, some people choose to be more open about their own self-harm, and awareness organizations make special efforts to raise awareness about self-harm.

== Other animals ==
Self-harm in non-human mammals is a well-established but not widely known phenomenon. Its study under zoo or laboratory conditions could lead to a better understanding of self-harm in human patients.

Zoo or laboratory rearing and isolation are important factors leading to increased susceptibility to self-harm in higher mammals, e.g., macaque monkeys. Non-primate mammals are also known to mutilate themselves under laboratory conditions after administration of drugs. For example, pemoline, clonidine, amphetamine, and very high (toxic) doses of caffeine or theophylline are known to precipitate self-harm in lab animals.

In dogs, canine compulsive disorder can lead to self-inflicted injuries, for example canine lick granuloma. Captive birds are sometimes known to engage in feather-plucking, causing damage to feathers that can range from feather shredding to the removal of most or all feathers within the bird's reach, or even the mutilation of skin or muscle tissue.

Breeders of show mice have noticed similar behaviors. One known as "barbering" involves a mouse obsessively grooming the whiskers and facial fur off themselves and cage-mates.

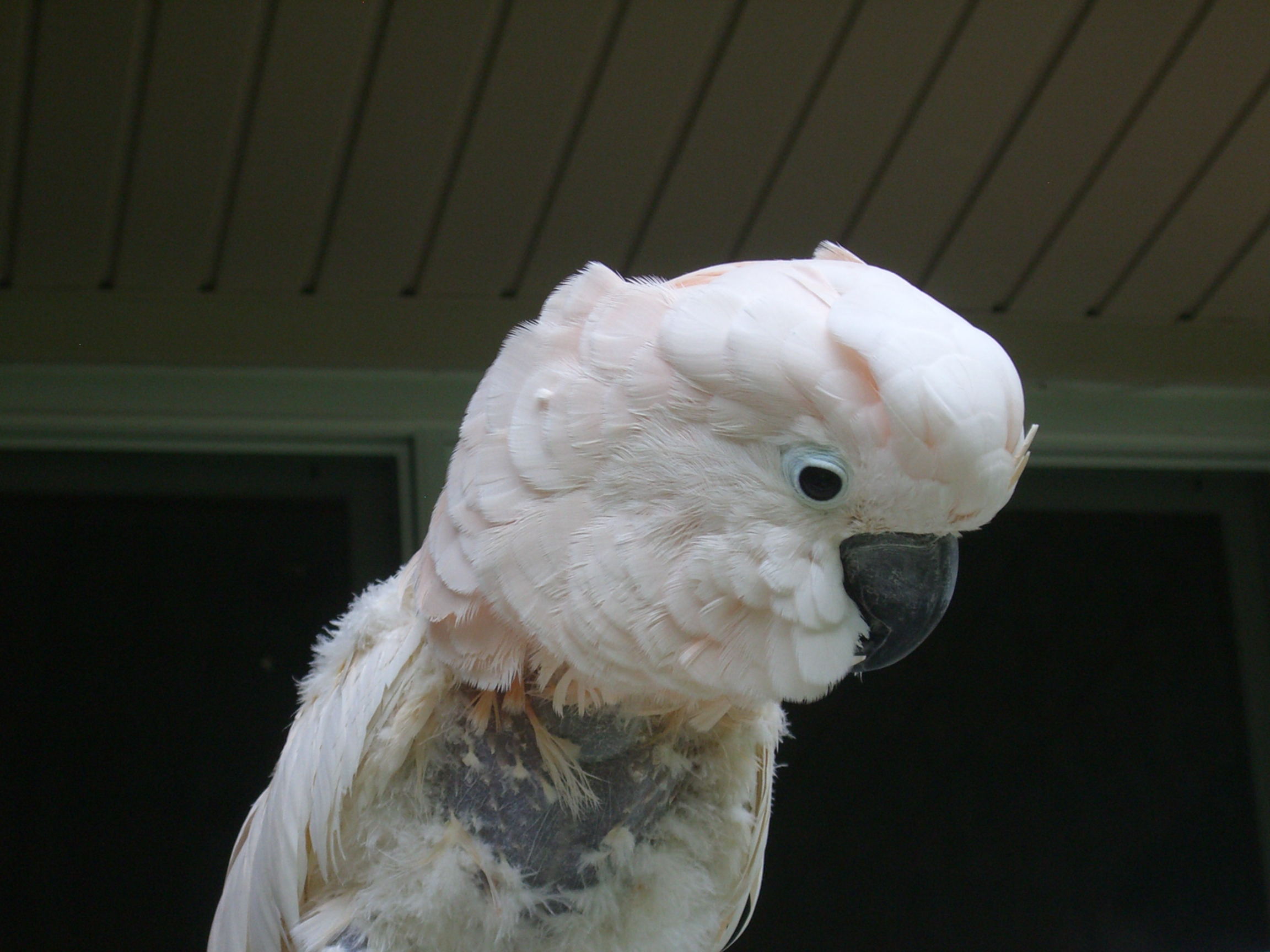
Feather-plucking in a Moluccan cockatoo

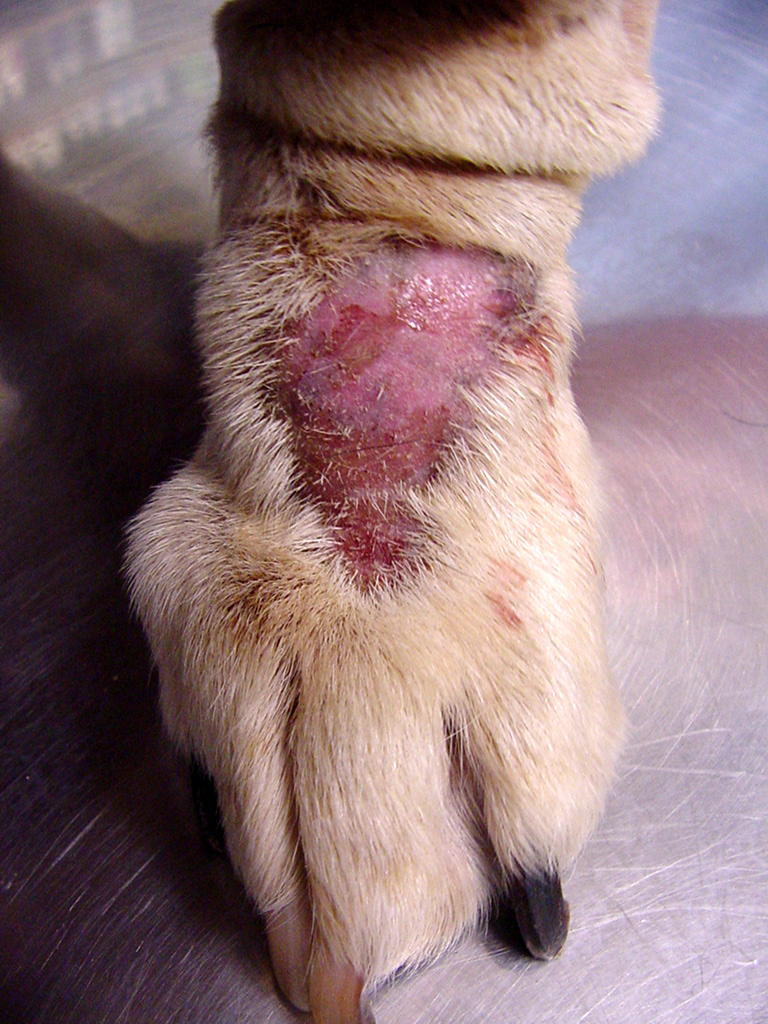
Lick granuloma from excessive licking

== See also ==
- Self-destructive behavior
- Self-hatred
- Self-Injurious Behavior Inhibiting System
