= Obsessive–compulsive spectrum =

Medical classification model

The obsessive–compulsive spectrum (OCS) is a model of medical classification where various psychiatric, neurological and/or medical conditions are described as existing on a spectrum of conditions related to obsessive–compulsive disorder (OCD). "The disorders are thought to lie on a spectrum from impulsive to compulsive where impulsivity is said to persist due to deficits in the ability to inhibit repetitive behavior with known negative consequences, while compulsivity persists as a consequence of deficits in recognizing completion of tasks." OCD is a mental disorder characterized by obsessions and/or compulsions. An obsession is defined as "a recurring thought, image, or urge that the individual cannot control". Compulsion can be described as a "ritualistic behavior that the person feels compelled to perform". The model suggests that many conditions overlap with OCD in symptomatic profile, demographics, family history, neurobiology, comorbidity, clinical course and response to various pharmacotherapies. Conditions described as being on the spectrum are sometimes referred to as obsessive–compulsive spectrum disorders.

== Conditions ==
The following conditions have been hypothesized by various researchers as existing on the spectrum.

- Body dysmorphic disorder
- Some forms of delusional disorder
- Eating disorders, including anorexia nervosa, bulimia nervosa and binge eating disorder
- Hypochondriasis
- Psychotic disorders and schizophrenia-spectrum disorders
- Kleptomania
- Impulse control disorders in general
- Olfactory reference syndrome
- Paraphilias
- Pathological gambling
- Pica
- Non-paraphilic sexual addictions
- Tourette syndrome
- Stereotypic movement disorder
- Body-focused repetitive behaviors, such as trichotillomania and excoriation disorder
- Autism spectrum disorder
- Social phobia
- Hoarding disorder
- Depersonalization-derealization disorder

However, recently there is a growing support for proposals to narrow down this spectrum to only include body dysmorphic disorder, hypochondriasis, tic disorders, and body focused repetitive behaviors. While both ICD-11 and DSM-5-TR include an obsessive-compulsive and related disorders section in their classification which is include only OCD, BDD, hoarding disorder, olfactory reference disorder excoriation disorder, trichotillomania, including other specified obsessive compulsive or other specified body-focused repetitive behavior disorder, it is critical to distinguish obsessive-compulsive and related disorders, which are diagnostic entities, from obsessive-compulsive (OCS) spectrum disorders, which are disorders that display obsessive-compulsive traits, without necessarily meeting criteria for OCD and others obsessive-compulsive related disorders

== Hoarding disorder ==
Hoarding disorder is a disorder characterised by a pattern of aversion of discarding or parting with any kind of possessions, regardless of their actual value, leading with an excessive accumulation of possessions. The difficulty to part from such possessions may include strong emotional attachment, perceived utility, aesthetic value or fear of losing information. Individuals with hoarding disorder might also display a pattern of excessive acquisitions, characterised by excessive buying, acquisition of free items and less commonly stealing, including possessions that might not be of any use for individuals with hoarding disorder. Individuals with hoarding disorder may experience intense distress (fear, anxiety, guilt, sadness or regret) at the thought of discarding possessions or when being prevented from acquiring items which can lead to excessive accumulation of possessions that can cause substantial functional impairment in social, occupational, and others areas, such as maintaining a safe environment for self or others.

== Body dysmorphic disorder ==
Body dysmorphic disorder is defined by an obsession with an imagined defect in physical appearance, and compulsive rituals in an attempt to conceal the perceived defect. Typical complaints include perceived facial flaws, perceived deformities of body parts and body size abnormalities. Some compulsive behaviors observed include mirror checking, ritualized application of makeup to hide the perceived flaw, excessive hair combing or cutting, excessive physician visits and plastic surgery. Body dysmorphic disorder is not gender specific and onset usually occurs in teens and young adults.

== Hypochondriasis ==
Hypochondriasis is excessive preoccupancy or worry about having a serious illness. These thoughts cause a person a great deal of anxiety and stress. The prevalence of this disorder is the same for men and women. Hypochondriasis is normally recognized in early adult age. Those with hypochondriasis are constantly thinking of their body functions, minor bumps and bruises as well as body images. Hypochondriacs go to numerous outpatient facilities for confirmation of their own diagnosis. Hypochondriasis is the belief that something is wrong but it is not known to be a delusion.

== Tic disorders ==
Tourette syndrome is a neurological disorder characterized by recurrent involuntary movements (motor tics) and involuntary noises (vocal tics). The reason Tourette syndrome and other tic disorders are being considered for placement in the obsessive compulsive spectrum is because of the phenomenology and co-morbidity of the disorders with obsessive–compulsive disorder. Within the population of patients with OCD up to 40% have a history of a tic disorder and 60% of people with Tourette's syndrome have obsessions or compulsions. Also, 30% of people with Tourette syndrome have clinically diagnosable OCD. Course of illness is another factor that suggests correlation because it has been found that tics displayed in childhood are a predictor of obsessive and compulsive symptoms in late adolescence and early adulthood. However, the association of Tourette's and tic disorders with OCD is challenged by neuropsychology and pharmaceutical treatment. Whereas OCD is treated with SSRIs, tics are treated with dopamine blockers and alpha-2 agonists.

== Trichotillomania ==
Trichotillomania is a body-focused repetitive behavior disorder which causes an individual to pull out their hair from various parts of their body without a purpose. The cause for trichotillomania remains unknown. Like OCD, trichotillomania is not a nervous condition but stress can trigger this habit. For some people pulling their hair out of boredom is normal, but that is not the case for someone that is dealing with trichotillomania. Emotions do not affect the behavior but these behaviors are more prevalent in those with depression. Review articles recommend behavioral interventions such as habit reversal training and decoupling.

== Sources ==
- Yaryura-Tobias JA, Stevens KP, Pérez-Rivera R, Boullosa OE, Neziroglu F (October 2000). "Negative outcome after neurosurgery for refractory obsessive–compulsive spectrum disorder". The World Journal of Biological Psychiatry. 1 (4): 197–203. doi:10.3109/15622970009150592. PMID 12607216. S2CID 36129738.
- Curran S, Matthews K (April 2001). "Response to Yaryura-Tobias et al (2000) negative outcome after neurosurgery for refractory obsessive–compulsive spectrum disorder, World J Biol Psychiatry 1: 197-203". The World Journal of Biological Psychiatry. 2 (2): 107. doi:10.3109/15622970109027502. PMID 12587194. S2CID 36184332.
- Yaryura-Tobias JA (October 2001). "Response to Dr. S. Curran and Dr. K. Matthew's Letter to the editor (World J Biol Psychiatry 2001, 2: 107) concerning Yaryura-Tobias et al (2000) negative outcome after neurosurgery for refractory obsessive–compulsive spectrum disorder, World J Biol Psychiatry 1: 197-203". The World Journal of Biological Psychiatry. 2 (4): 199. doi:10.3109/15622970109026811. PMID 12587151. S2CID 10983203.
- Hollander, Eric; Benzaquen, Stephanie D. (January 1997). "The obsessive-compulsive spectrum disorders". International Review of Psychiatry. 9 (1): 99–110. doi:10.1080/09540269775628. ISSN 0954-0261.
- Ravindran, Arun V; da Silva, Tricia L; Ravindran, Lakshmi N; Richter, Margaret A; Rector, Neil A (May 2009). "Obsessive-Compulsive Spectrum Disorders: A Review of the Evidence-Based Treatments". The Canadian Journal of Psychiatry. 54 (5): 331–343. doi:10.1177/070674370905400507. ISSN 0706-7437. PMID 19497165.
- Brakoulias, Vlasios; Starcevic, Vladan; Sammut, Peter; Berle, David; Milicevic, Denise; Moses, Karen; Hannan, Anthony (April 2011). "Obsessive-Compulsive Spectrum Disorders: a Comorbidity and Family History Perspective". Australasian Psychiatry. 19 (2): 151–155. doi:10.3109/10398562.2010.526718. ISSN 1039-8562. PMID 21332382. S2CID 30874158.
- Lochner, Christine; Stein, Dan J. (2010). "Obsessive-Compulsive Spectrum Disorders in Obsessive-Compulsive Disorder and Other Anxiety Disorders". Psychopathology. 43 (6): 389–396. doi:10.1159/000321070. ISSN 0254-4962. PMID 20847586. S2CID 31447915.
- "What Is Hair Pulling? About Hair Pulling & Skin Picking". Trichotillomania Learning Center. April 17, 2013. Archived from the original on January 25, 2009.
