= RMD =

RMD may refer to:

- Gas metal arc welding#Modified short-circuiting
- Required minimum distribution from an individual retirement account (IRA) or qualified retirement plan in the United States
- Revenue Management Division, government division of Bangladesh
- RMD Engineering College, a self-financing college in Chennai, Tamil Nadu
- GDP-4-dehydro-6-deoxy-D-mannose reductase
- Richard Mofe Damijo (popularly known as RMD), Nigerian actor
- Rhythmic movement disorder
- Richmond station (London), by National Rail station code
- Richmond railway station, Melbourne
- Raytheon Missiles & Defense
