= Body-focused repetitive behavior =

Compulsions toward damaging one's own body in some way

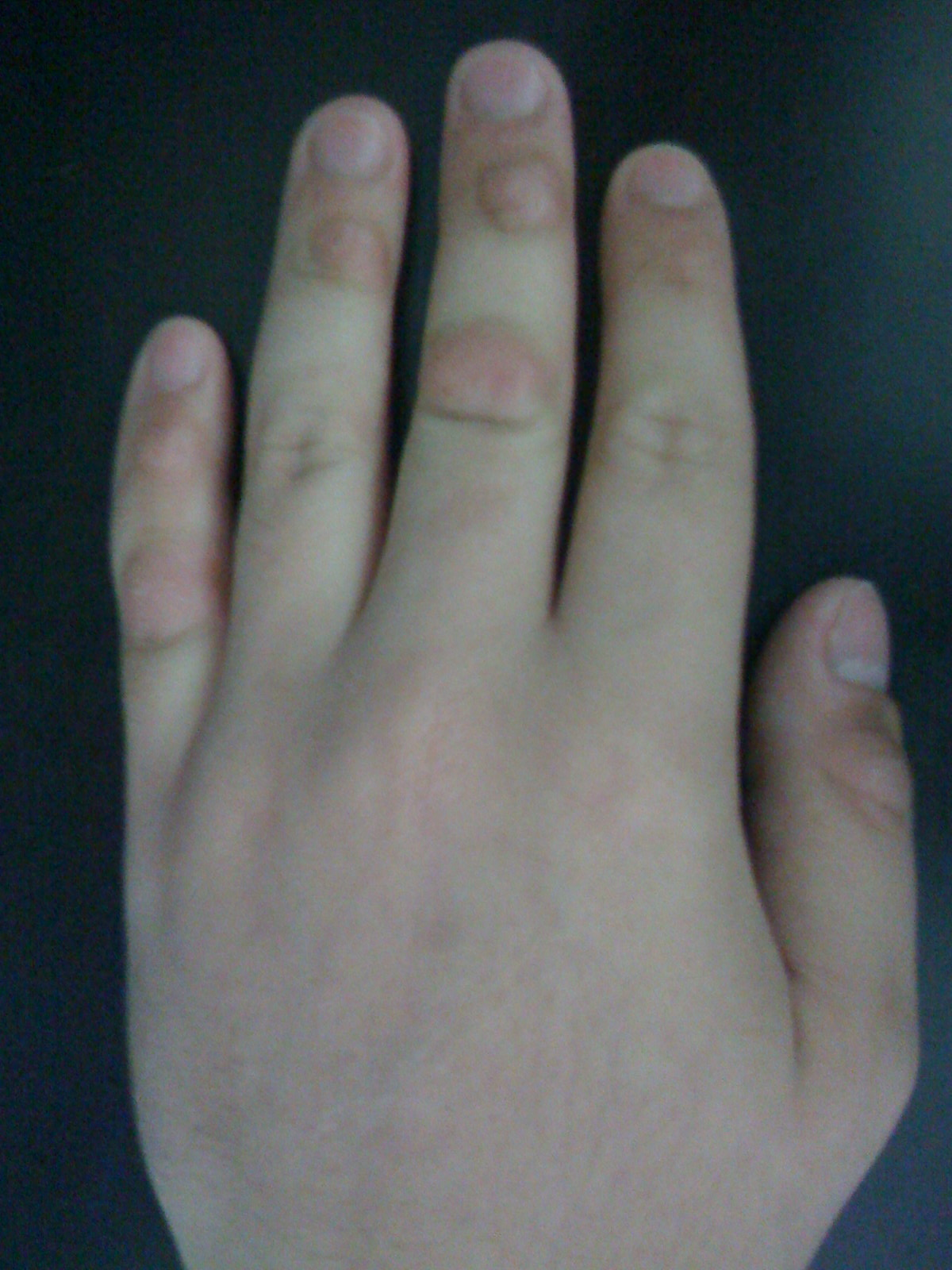
- Dermatillomania (picking of the skin) of the knuckles (via mouth), illustrating disfiguration of the distal and proximal joints of the middle and little fingers

Body-focused repetitive behavior (BFRB) is an umbrella name for impulse-control behaviors involving compulsively damaging one's physical appearance or causing physical injury.

BFRB disorders are currently estimated to be under the obsessive–compulsive spectrum. They are also associated with attention deficit hyperactivity disorder (ADHD) and anxiety.

== Causes ==
The cause of BFRBs is unknown.

Emotional variables may have a differential impact on the expression of BFRBs.

Research has suggested that the urge to repetitive self-injury is similar to a body-focused repetitive behavior but others have argued that for some the condition is more akin to a substance abuse disorder.

Researchers are investigating a possible genetic component.

=== Onset ===
BFRBs most often begin in late childhood or in the early teens.

== Diagnosis ==
=== Types ===
The main BFRB disorders are:

- Skin
  - Dermatillomania (excoriation disorder), skin picking
  - Dermatophagia, skin biting/consumption
- Mouth
  - Morsicatio buccarum, cheek biting
  - Morsicatio labiorum, inner lip biting
  - Morsicatio linguarum, tongue biting
- Nails
  - Onychotillomania, nail picking
  - Onychophagia, nail biting
- Nose
  - Rhinotillexomania, nose picking
- Hair
  - Trichotillomania, hair pulling
  - Trichophagia, hair biting followed by consumption
  - Trichodaganomania, hair biting
  - Trichotemnomania, hair cutting
  - Trichoteiromania, hair rubbing
- Eyes
  - Mucus fishing syndrome, removing or "fishing" strands of mucus from the eye

== Treatment ==
=== Psychotherapy ===
Treatment can include behavior modification therapy, medication, and family therapy. The evidence base criteria for BFRBs is strict and methodical. Individual behavioral therapy has been shown as a "probably effective" evidence-based therapy to help with thumb sucking, and possibly nail biting. Cognitive behavioral therapy was cited as experimental evidence based therapy to treat trichotillomania and nail biting; a systematic review found best evidence for habit reversal training and decoupling. Another form of treatment that focuses on mindfulness, stimuli, and rewards has proven effective in some people. However, no treatment was deemed well-established to treat any form of BFRBs.

=== Pharmacotherapy ===
Excoriation disorder and trichotillomania have been treated with inositol and N-acetylcysteine.

=== Decoupling ===
Decoupling is a behavioral self-help intervention for body-focused repetitive behavior (BFRB). The user is instructed to modify the original dysfunctional behavioral path by performing a counter-movement shortly before completing the self-injurious behavior (e.g., biting nails, picking skin, pulling hair). This is intended to trigger an irritation, which enables the person to detect and stop the compulsive behavior at an early stage. A systematic review from 2012 suggested some efficacy of decoupling, which was corroborated by another study in 2019. Decoupling was shown to be superior to habit reversal training in treating BFRB in one direct comparison study in 2021.

== Prevalence ==
BFRBs are among the most poorly understood, misdiagnosed, and undertreated groups of disorders. BFRBs may affect at least 1 out of 20 people. These collections of symptoms have been known for a number of years, but only recently have appeared in widespread medical literature. Trichotillomania alone is believed to affect 10 million people in the United States.

== See also ==
- Stereotypic movement disorder
- Rhythmic movement disorder
- Body dysmorphic disorder
- Habit reversal training
