= Compulsive behavior =

Habit and impulse disorder

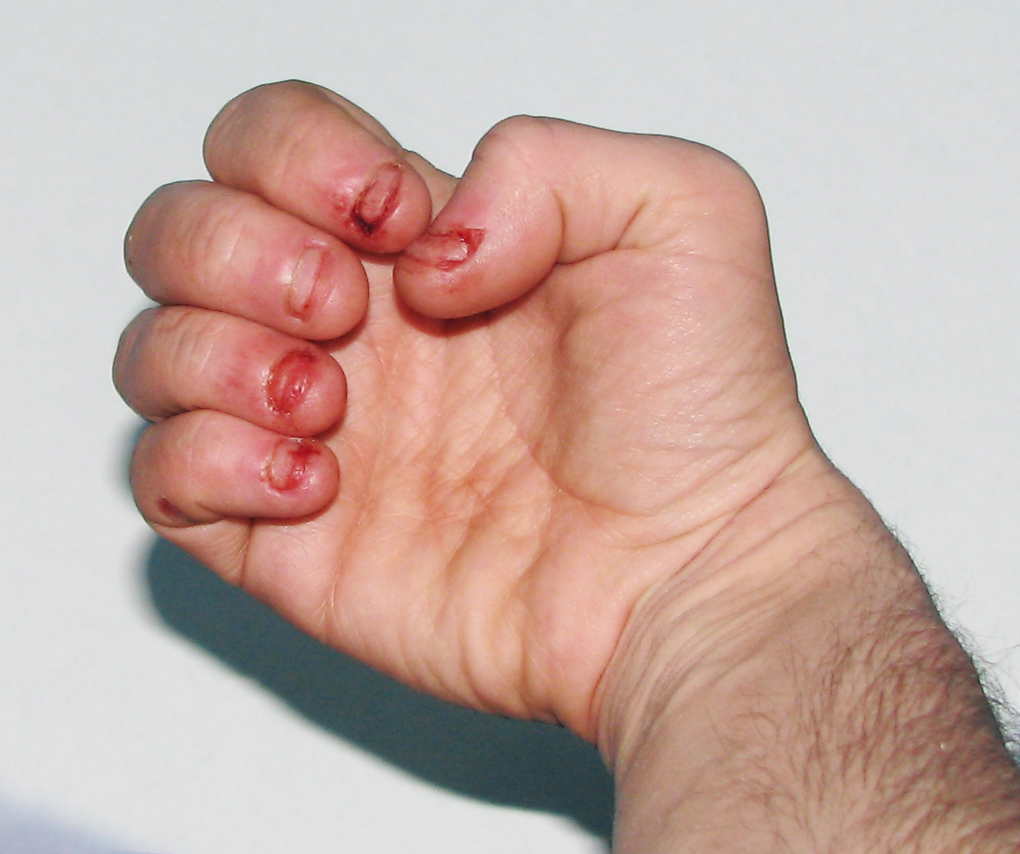
Dermatophagia – extreme nail biting/biting of skin to point of an obsessive–compulsive disorder (OCD) or other condition leading to self mutilating behaviour such as autistic spectrum disorders (as is the case in this example) or Lesch–Nyhan syndrome.

Compulsive behavior (or compulsion) is defined as performing an action persistently and repetitively. Compulsive behaviors could be an attempt to make obsessions go away. Compulsive behaviors are a need to reduce apprehension caused by internal feelings a person wants to abstain from or control. A major cause of compulsive behavior is obsessive–compulsive disorder (OCD). "Compulsive behavior is when someone keeps doing the same action because they feel like they have to, even though they know these actions do not align with their goals." An individual may perform certain actions in an attempt to prevent or reduce anxiety, uncertainty, or negative consequences. The elements that make a behavior compulsive is when one feels the need to do an action, cannot stop themselves from doing that action, and being aware that these actions go against their goals. These actions are done in a habitual and repetitive manner with a specific pattern.

There are many different types of compulsive behaviors including shopping, hoarding, eating, gambling, trichotillomania and picking skin, itching, checking, counting, washing, sex, scrupulosity and more.

== Disorders in which it is seen ==
Addiction and obsessive–compulsive disorder (OCD) feature compulsive behavior as core features. Addiction is simply a compulsion toward a rewarding stimulus, whereas in OCD, compulsions are an attempt to reduce distressing and obsessive thoughts. The compulsive behaviors that individuals with OCD do are often related to their obsessive thoughts and performed to relieve anxiety caused by these thoughts; this is unlike habits, which are repeated behaviors done automatically or out of routine. The most common compulsions for people with OCD are washing and checking.

Addiction is not a compulsive behavior in the beginning stages. An individual typically derives pleasure from the substance or behavior in the beginning. After some time, the addiction can become a compulsive behavior when that individual begins to depend on the substance or behavior for relief rather than pleasure. Many people with OCD also suffer with substance abuse disorder.

While not all compulsive behaviors are addictions, some such as compulsive sexual behavior have been identified as behavioral addictions.

== Occurrence ==
OCD tends to present itself between the ages of 7 and 12 and between the late teen years and early adulthood, around age 20. On average, children and teens experience OCD symptoms for 2.5 years before assessment. Around an additional 1.5 years may pass before they seek treatment due to hidden or confusing symptoms. About 1 in 40 adults have OCD or will develop it at some point in their lives.

== Types ==
=== Shopping ===
Compulsive shopping is characterized by excessive shopping that causes impairment in a person's life such as financial issues or not being able to commit to a family. The prevalence rate for this compulsive behavior is 5.8% worldwide, and a majority of the people who are affected by this type of behavior are women (approximately 80%). There is no proven treatment for this type of compulsive behavior. The research on treatment has shown mixed results. Some research has found that cognitive behavioral therapy may help reduce this behavior, while others found no significant improvements.

=== Hoarding ===
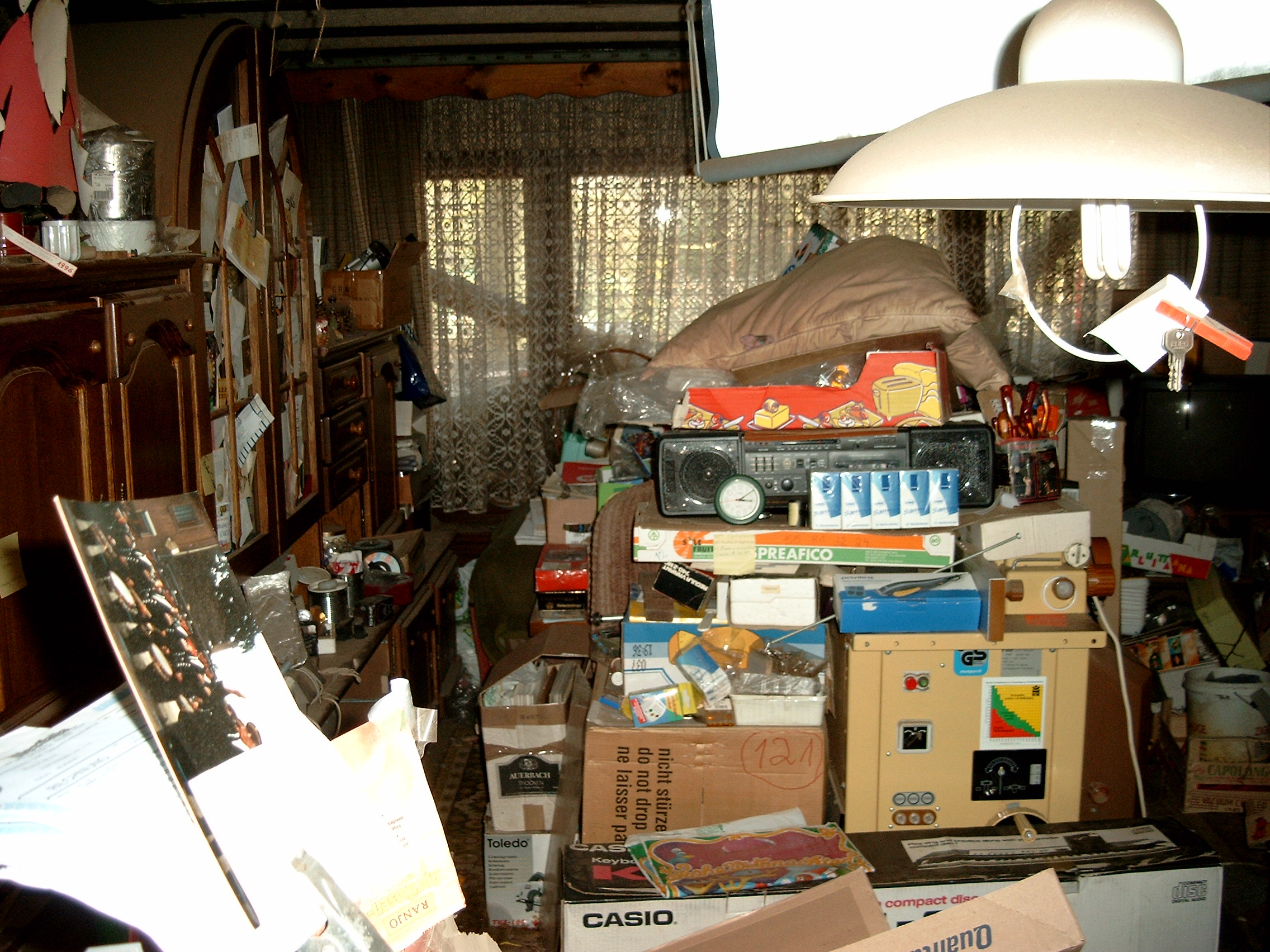
Compulsive hoarding

Hoarding is characterized by excessive saving of possessions and having problems when throwing these belongings away. Major features of hoarding include not being able to use the capacity of one's living quarters efficiently, having difficulty moving throughout the home due to the massive amount of possessions, as well as having blocked exits that can pose a danger to the hoarder and their family and guests. Items that are typically saved by hoarders include clothes, newspapers, containers, junk mail, books, craft items, bills and receipts, and household supplies. Hoarders believe these items will be useful in the future or they are too sentimental to throw them away. Other reasons include fear of losing important documents and information and object characteristics. Hoarding can be harmful if it poses a health risk to the person and/or others in their house. Examples of health risks include clutter creating unhygienic conditions encouraging potential rodent or insect infestations, fire risks, or trip and fall risks.

=== Eating ===
Compulsive overeating is the inability to control one's amount of nutritional intake, resulting in excessive weight gain. This overeating is usually a coping mechanism to deal with issues in the individual's life such as stress. Most compulsive over-eaters know that what they are doing is not good for them. The compulsive behavior usually develops in early childhood. People who struggle with compulsive eating usually do not have proper coping skills to deal with the emotional issues that cause their overindulgence in food. They indulge in binges, periods of varying duration in which they eat and/or drink without pause until the compulsion passes or they are unable to consume any more. These binges are usually accompanied by feelings of guilt and shame about using food to avoid emotional stress. This compulsive behavior can have severe side effects including, but not limited to, binge eating, depression, withdrawal from activities due to weight, and spontaneous dieting. Though this is a very serious compulsive behavior, getting treatment and a proper diet plan can help individuals overcome these behaviors. In eating disorders (like anorexia nervosa and bulimia nervosa) a person is preoccupied with weight, body and caloric intake. In this, there are certain behaviors, which are maladaptive and persistent and could be viewed as compulsive behaviors. For instance, restricting what the person eats, vomiting, abusing laxatives, and over-exercising.

=== Gambling ===
Compulsive gambling is characterized by having the desire to gamble and not being able to resist said desires. The gambling leads to serious personal and social issues in the individual's life. This compulsive behavior usually begins in early adolescence for men and between the ages of 20-40 for women. People who have issues controlling compulsions to gamble usually have an even harder time resisting when they are having a stressful time in life. People who gamble compulsively tend to run into issues with family members, the law, and the places and people they gamble with. The majority of the issues with this compulsive behavior are due to lack of money to continue gambling or pay off debt from previous gambling. Compulsive gambling can be helped with various forms of treatment such as cognitive behavioral therapy, self-help or twelve-step programs, and potentially medication.

=== Body-focused repetitive behaviors ===
Trichotillomania is classified as a compulsive picking of hair of the body. It can be from any place on the body that has hair. This picking results in bald spots. Most people who have mild trichotillomania can overcome it via concentration and more self-awareness.

Those with compulsive skin picking have issues with picking, rubbing, digging, or scratching the skin. These activities are usually to get rid of unwanted blemishes or marks on the skin. These compulsions also tend to leave abrasions and irritation on the skin. This can lead to infection or other issues in healing. These acts tend to be prevalent in times of anxiety, boredom, or stress. Reviews recommend behavioral interventions such as habit reversal training and decoupling.

=== Checking, counting, washing, and repeating ===
Compulsive checking can include compulsively checking items such as locks, switches, and appliances. This type of compulsion usually deals with checking whether harm to oneself or others is possible. Usually, most checking behaviors occur due to wanting to keep others and the individual safe; this condition is also known as obsessive-compulsive behavior.

People with compulsive counting tend to have a specific number that is of importance in the situation they are in. When a number is considered significant, the individual has a desire to do the behavior such as wiping one's face off the number of times that is significant. Compulsive counting can include instances of counting things such as steps, items, behaviors, and mental counting.

Compulsive washing is usually found in individuals that have a fear of contamination. People that have compulsive hand washing behaviors wash their hands repeatedly throughout the day. These hand washings can be ritualized and follow a pattern. People that have problems with compulsive hand washing tend to have problems with chapped or red hands due to the excessive amount of washing done each day.

Compulsive repeating is characterized by doing the same activity multiple times over. These activities can include re-reading a part of a book multiple times, re-writing something multiple times, repeating routine activities, or saying the same phrase over and over.

=== Sexual behavior ===
This type of compulsive behavior is characterized by feelings, thoughts, and behaviors about anything related to sex. These thoughts have to be pervasive and cause problems in health, occupation, socialization, or other parts of life. These feelings, thoughts, and behaviors can include normal sexual behaviors or behaviors that are considered illegal and/or morally and culturally unacceptable. This disorder is also known as hyper-sexuality, hyper-sexual disorder, nymphomania or sexual addiction.

=== Exercise ===
Compulsive exercise is another compulsive behavior that typically impacts people with eating disorders, obsessive-compulsive disorder, and other addictions. People who have this compulsion feel a sense of euphoria or reward by engaging in excessive and rigorous exercise. This excessive amount of exercise can lead to many negative consequences such as anxiety, depression, injury, and impaired relationships. Even with these harmful effects, people may continue exercising because they believe that the benefits outweigh the risks. The prevalence of this behavior is hard to determine because individuals may differ on what they deem to be "too much" exercise based on different factors. For example, athletes may engage in an excessive amount of exercise, but they may not be viewed as engaging in compulsive exercise. It is particularly difficult to treat this behavior because individuals may be incompliant or unmotivated to change, but some research has proposed that cognitive behavioral therapy and motivational interviewing may help.

=== Talking ===
Compulsive talking goes beyond the bounds of what is considered to be a socially acceptable amount of talking. The two main factors in determining if someone is a compulsive talker are talking in a continuous manner, only stopping when the other person starts talking, and others perceiving their talking as a problem. Personality traits that have been positively linked to this compulsion include assertiveness, willingness to communicate, self-perceived communication competence, and neuroticism. Studies have shown that most people who engage in compulsive talking are aware of the amount of talking they do, are unable to stop, and do not see it as a problem.

=== Social media use ===
Compulsive social media use is characterized by placing excessive value on the importance of social media, or social media addiction. Individuals with OCD have been found to place greater importance on social media and are at greater risk of developing social media addiction. Social media sites can also serve as mediums through which OCD patients exhibit other common symptoms of the disorder, such as hoarding online images.

=== Relationship ===
Compulsive relationship-focused thoughts, which is commonly referred to as relationship OCD, is a form of OCD that is specific to romantic relationships. This type of OCD is not a diagnosable mental health disorder, but rather a manifestation of OCD, with the term being seen increasingly in social media and the news. People who have this often are filled with intrusive thoughts regarding their romantic relationship such as:

- "Is my partner truly 'the one?'"
- "Do I actually love my partner?"
- "What if I'm attracted to someone else?"
- "What if I'm making a mistake by staying?"
- "What if my partner cheated on me?"
- "What if I cheat on my partner?"
- "What if my partner does not really love me?"
- "I feel attracted to somebody who isn't my partner. Does that mean I don't love them?"

These questions may lead one to ask their partner to reaffirm their love for them multiple times a day, which can become problematic to both parties in the relationship. People with relationship OCD often can recognize their thoughts are irrational, but are still unable to resist the thoughts and seek assurance from their partner. The individual experiencing relationship OCD can become very overwhelmed and distressed by these intrusive thoughts, and the partner of the individual with OCD can become distressed when having to constantly reassure their partner despite expressing their interest. Additional actions include comparing their relationships to others or mentally reviewing interactions and small details to gain certainty.

=== Scrupulosity ===
This is a subtype of OCD involving religious or moral obsessions. Individuals with this form of OCD experience excessive concern that they are violating religious or moral rules through their actions or even thoughts. They worry this reflects who they truly are as a person and will result in punishment from God. Common obsessions seen in scrupulosity revolve around fears of committing blasphemy or angering God. Along with worrying, behavioral compulsions can include repeating cleansing and purifying rituals, treating religious events as mandatory when they are not, excessive confession, and seeking assurance from religious leaders. Mental compulsions can include repeated prayer and imagining of sacred images and saying, attempting to replace "bad" or "unfaithful" thoughts, and making deals with God.

== Common misconceptions ==
- There are many common misconceptions surrounding OCD and how it presents itself within society.
  - OCD is only about extreme cleanliness or orderliness. (Mental rituals also exist)
  - OCD is just a minor personality quirk or preference. (Disrupts daily functioning significantly)
  - Compulsions are always physical behaviors. (Can be purely mental)
  - OCD is rare and affects few people. (Affects 1–2% globally)
  - Everyone has a little bit of OCD. (Persistent distress distinguishes OCD)
  - OCD is just a phase and will resolve on its own. (Commonly chronic without treatment)
  - OCD is caused by lack of willpower. (Neurobiological, not moral)
  - OCD cannot be treated. (Therapy and medication are effective)
  - Avoiding triggers will cure OCD. (Avoidance reinforces compulsions)
  - OCD presents the same way in everyone. (Symptoms vary)

== Impact ==
Compulsive behavior can have many negative impacts on an individual. Some compulsive behaviors like excessive exercise can lead to injuries, that may get worse if the person continues behavior. Compulsive behaviors can also negatively impact daily life. These behaviors are often long lasting and hard to manage.They may be so repetitive that they take up large amounts of time, which can impact a person's life and ability to function. An individual suffering from compulsive behavior may also experience an impairment in their relationships. Another challenge associated with this behavior is the risk of misdiagnosis, which can further delay individuals from receiving appropriate treatment and allow the behavior to worsen over time.

== Treatment ==
- Exposure and Response Prevention is offered to those with OCD. This involved resisting compulsive behaviors while facing feared thoughts/situations.
- Cognitive Behavioral Therapy offers assistance for patients to identify and challenge irrational thoughts.
- Acceptance and Commitment Therapy aids in accepting fear thoughts and living in accordance with individual values.
- Dialectical Behavior Therapy teaches skills to manage OCD induced emotions and behaviors.
- Medications are often used alongside therapy, including first-choice SSRIs like fluoxetine, fluvoxamine, paroxetine, and sertraline, tricyclic antidepressants such as Clomipramine, and other psychiatric medications if standard treatment isn’t enough.

== See also ==
- Addictive behavior
- Addiction psychology
- Animal psychopathology
- Attention seeking
- Compulsion loop
- Compulsive lying
- Executive dysfunction
- Fixed action pattern
- Illusion of control
- Intrusive thought
- Obsessive love
- Pain and pleasure
- Rumination (psychology)
- The Scorpion and the Frog
