= Onychoschizia =

Splitting of the free-edged tip of the nail

Onychoschizia, also known as nail splitting and brittle nails, is a splitting of the free-edged tip of the nail. There is also often a longitudinal split in addition to the separation of keratin layers.

== Cause ==
Frequent hand-washing is the usual cause, but it is also part of normal ageing. Manicures, nail polish and remover, nail biting, and repeated trauma such as typing, can contribute to nail splitting. Dehydration likely plays a role. Nutritional deficiencies that can result in nail splitting include iron, selenium, and zinc. Some skin diseases such as psoriasis and lichen planus may feature such nails.

== Diagnosis ==
Diagnosis is by its appearance, but sometimes blood tests are required to look for iron deficiency, thyroid problems, and kidney problems.

== Treatment ==
Treatment is by discontinuing nail polish and applying moisturiser. An acceptable alternative is gel nails. Some favourable response has been reported with biotin if the person is deficient in vitamin B_{7}. It is not routinely given.

== Epidemiology ==
It is common among women and occurs in almost a third of newborns.

== Other animals ==
It also occurs in hooved animals such as horses.

== See also ==
- List of cutaneous conditions
