= Cupio dissolvi =

Latin translation of a biblical phrase

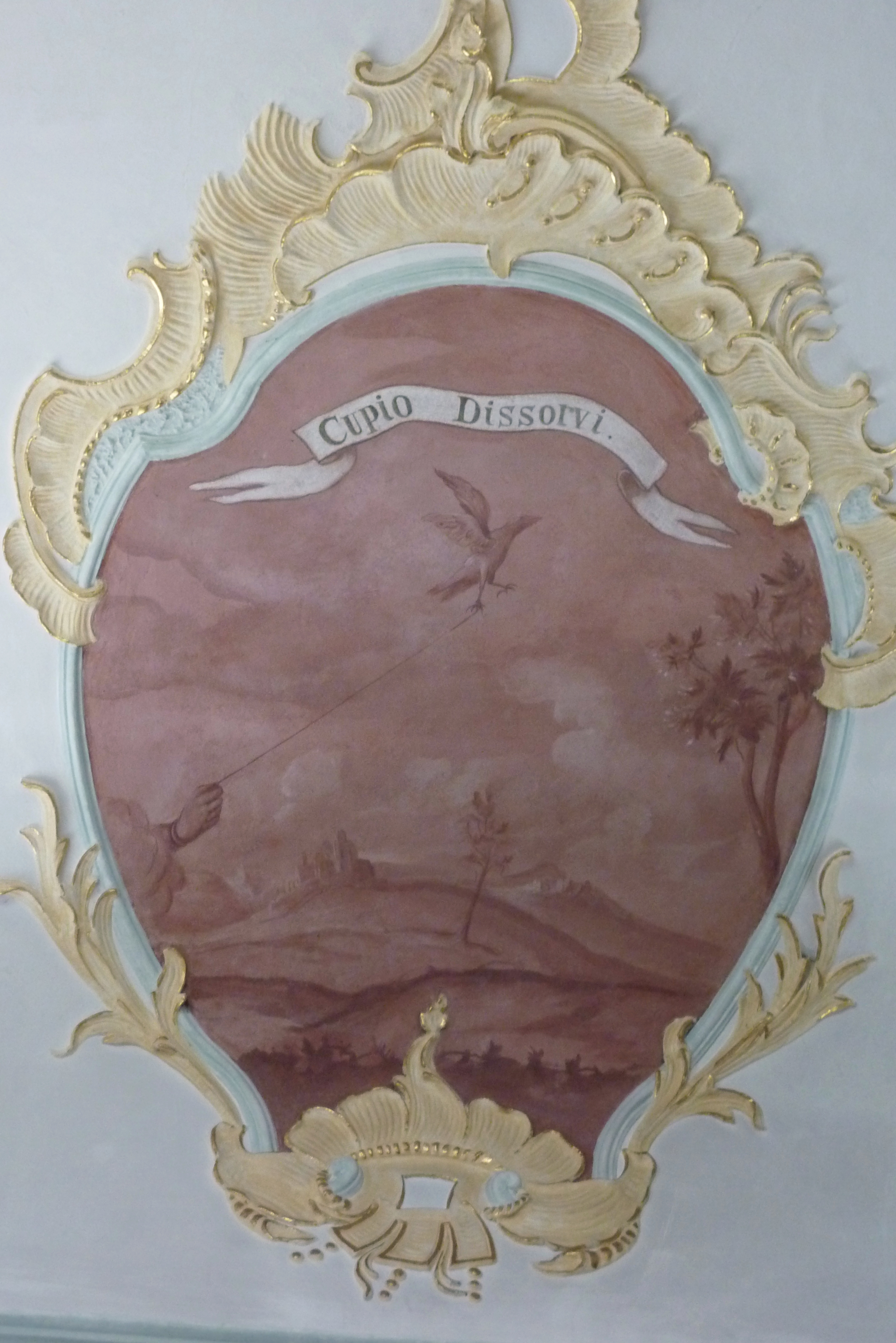
Emblem with the inscription cupio dissolvi (stucco and painted ceiling circa 1756, Höchstädt an der Donau).

Cupio dissolvi is a Latin locution used in translations prior to the Vulgate of the Paul's epistle to Philippians 1:23–4. The phrase, literally meaning "I wish to be dissolved", expresses the Christian desire to leave the earthly life and join Christ in eternal life. It has played an important role in discussions on the topic of suicide from the Middle Ages to the early Modern period. Over time, however, especially where national idioms derive from Romance languages, the phrase has acquired more secular and profane meanings and uses, expressing such concepts as the rejection of existence and the masochistic desire for self-destruction.

== Quote and interpretation ==
Συνέχομαι δὲ ἐκ τῶν δύο, τὴν ἐπιθυμίαν ἔχων εἰς τὸ ἀναλῦσαι καὶ σὺν χριστῷ εἴναι, πολλῷ μᾶλλον κρεῖσσον· τὸ δὲ ἐπιμένειν ἐν τῇ σαρκὶ ἀναγκαιότερον δι' ὑμᾶς.

Synechomai de ek tōn dyo, tēn epithymian echōn eis to analysai kai syn Christō einai, pollō gar mallon kreisson to de epimenein tē sarki anankaioteron di' hymas.

Coartor autem e duobus desiderium habens dissolvi et cum Christo esse multo magis melius / permanere autem in carne magis necessarium est propter vos.

The Douay–Rheims Bible translates:

But I am straitened between two: having a desire to be dissolved and to be with Christ, a thing by far the better. But to abide still in the flesh, is needful for you.

Cupio dissolvi et esse cum Christo, engraving by Cornelis Visscher of Francis of Assisi receiving the infant Jesus from Mary in a vision.

The phrase occurs in one of Paul's ecstasies, the loosening of the soul from the body being a prerequisite to joining Christ. A traditional use is found, for instance, in The Seven Modes of Sacred Love, by Brabantian mystic Beatrice of Nazareth (1200–1268): a complete release of the soul into eternal love. A similar use is found in a twelfth-century Old English homily on St. James from Trinity College, Cambridge, MS.B.14.52: "Hateful to me is this earthly life, and I long for Christ".

For medieval theologians, the concept was unproblematic; Rabanus Maurus (780-856) clarifies that this desire is an example of an acceptable cupiditas or greed. Not until the eleventh century is a note of warning struck, by Peter Lombard (1096–1164): it does not mean that one should only tolerate earthly life instead of loving it, suggesting that the locution had been read to mean that hastening one's end is preferable over living out one's life (as a notion deriving from Seneca, for instance), a misreading offered in Hildebert's Querimonia.

Michel de Montaigne (1533–1592) and contemporary theologians read the phrase also as "giv[ing] the lie to those who say that the desire to die means sinful despair"; cupio dissolvi is a frequently cited locution in the ongoing discussion on suicide, which often took the semi-Platonic character of the reputed suicide Cleombrotus of Ambracia as a case study.

=== Among English authors ===
The locution is cited in important texts from all stages of the English language. In the Old English homily of Trinity MS.B.14.52, it occurs in Latin (spelled "cupio dissolui") surrounded by Old English prose. In Middle English, it occurs for instance in the Lambeth Homilies, translated as "ich walde thet ich ded were, for me longeth to criste." It was frequently quoted by Thomas More (1478–1535) especially as he got older, and by John Donne (1572–1631) in many of his sermons.

== Wider meaning ==
In Donne, the use of this phrase is taken as indicative of the strength of his "desire to believe himself among God's elect", while, for the exegesis influenced by Freud, of his being "possessed not only by the 'death wish' but also by a lifetime's struggle against it that this consideration should powerfully, even finally, determine our sense of the overall direction and significance of his work."

The Latin locution occurs in alchemist Heinrich Khunrath's Von hylealischen [...] Chaos, 1597, p. 204 (205?). Carl Jung, founder of the analytical psychology, quoted him to describe the process of dream interpretation and individuation: "Soul and spirit must be separated from the body, and this is equivalent to death: 'Therefore Paul of Tarsus saith, Cupio dissolvi, et esse cum Christo'."

The cultural theorist Dominic Pettman explained the twentieth century and the postmodern contemporary society, swung violently between the poles of anticipation and anticlimax, citing a statement expressed by Mario Praz in 1930:

"The very ideas of Decadence, [...] of the 'cupio dissolvi', [the desire to dissolve], are perhaps no more than the extreme sadistic refinements of a milieu which was saturated to excess with complications of perversion."

Cupio dissolvi "is also a theme that we see repeatedly—albeit in a more secular form—in punk lyrics, film, and art, expressed as a provocative and somewhat naïve desire for death", for example in the verses of "Marquee Moon", the 1977 "title track from the American band Television's first album".
