= Onychotillomania =

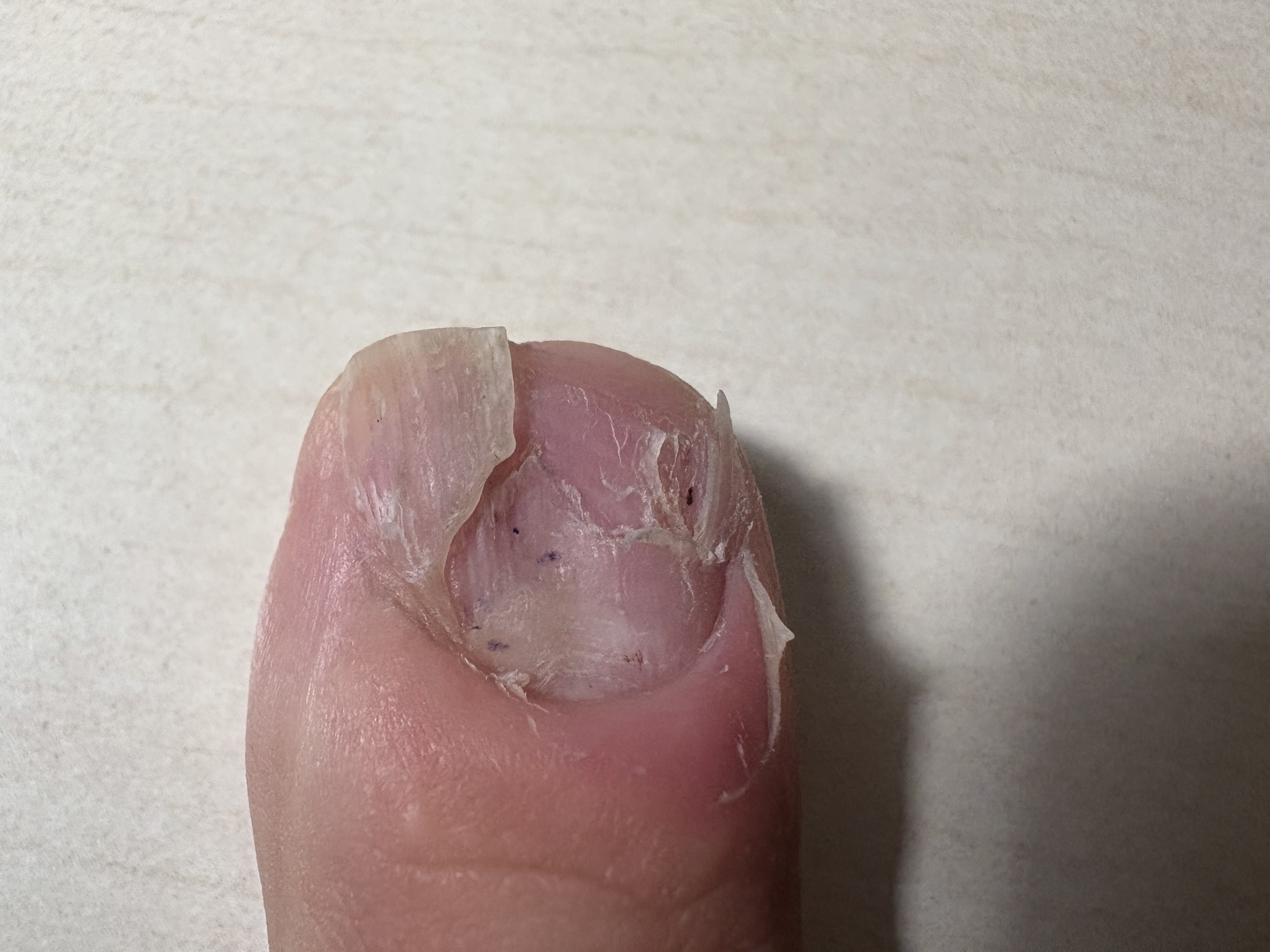
- The fingernail of a subject exhibiting the signs of the neurosis
- Specialty: Psychiatry

Onychotillomania is a compulsive behavior in which a person picks constantly at the nails or tries to tear them off. It is not the same as onychophagia, where the nails are bitten or chewed, or dermatillomania, where skin is bitten or scratched. Onychotillomania can be categorized as a body-focused repetitive behavior in the DSM-5 and is a form of skin picking, also known as excoriation disorder.

It can be associated with psychiatric disorders such as depressive neurosis, delusions of infestation and hypochondriasis.

It was named by Jan Alkiewicz, a Polish dermatologist.

The constant destruction of the nail bed leads to onychodystrophy, paronychia and darkening of the nail.

Some cases have been treated successfully with antipsychotics.

One cheap solution suggested by researchers is to cover the proximal nail fold with a Cyanoacrylate glue. "The mechanism of action for improvement is probably related to the presence of an obstacle to picking."

== See also ==
- Onychophagia
