= Mucus fishing syndrome =

Medical disorder

Mucus fishing syndrome

Mucus fishing syndrome is a rare condition caused by repeated self damage to the conjunctiva.

The condition causes excessive mucus production. Patients with this condition make their condition worse by removing mucus from their eyes.

== Causes ==
The condition often starts due to other untreated conditions.

Patients with vernal keratoconjunctivitis may develop this condition due to irritation from the mucus thread.

== Diagnosis ==
The condition is hard to diagnose because the patient may not admit to it due to embarrassment and shame.

Doctors may find signs of damage at the surface of the eye due to self-inflicted trauma.

== Treatment ==
Treatment for this condition requires treatment of the underlying condition.

Patients should be told to refrain from rubbing or removing mucus from their eyes. Patients are also given treatment for their underlying conjunctival disorder. Lubrication and topical acetylcysteine are also a requirement.
