= GDP-4-dehydro-6-deoxy-D-mannose reductase =

Enzyme

Identifiers
- EC no.: 1.1.1.281

Databases
- IntEnz: IntEnz view
- BRENDA: BRENDA entry
- ExPASy: NiceZyme view
- KEGG: KEGG entry
- MetaCyc: metabolic pathway
- PRIAM: profile
- PDB structures: RCSB PDB PDBe PDBsum
Search
- PMC: articles
- PubMed: articles
- NCBI: proteins

In enzymology, a GDP-4-dehydro-6-deoxy-D-mannose reductase (EC 1.1.1.281) is an enzyme that catalyzes the chemical reaction

GDP-6-deoxy-D-mannose + NAD(P)^{+} $\rightleftharpoons$ GDP-4-dehydro-6-deoxy-D-mannose + NAD(P)H + H^{+}

The 3 substrates of this enzyme are GDP-6-deoxy-D-mannose, NAD^{+}, and NADP^{+}, whereas its 4 products are GDP-4-dehydro-6-deoxy-D-mannose, NADH, NADPH, and H^{+}.

This enzyme belongs to the family of oxidoreductases, specifically those acting on the CH-OH group of donor with NAD^{+} or NADP^{+} as acceptor. The systematic name of this enzyme class is GDP-6-deoxy-D-mannose:NAD(P)^{+} 4-oxidoreductase (D-rhamnose-forming). Other names in common use include GDP-4-keto-6-deoxy-D-mannose reductase [ambiguous], GDP-6-deoxy-D-lyxo-4-hexulose reductase, and Rmd. This enzyme participates in fructose and mannose metabolism.
