= Dermatophagia =

Compulsion towards biting one's own skin

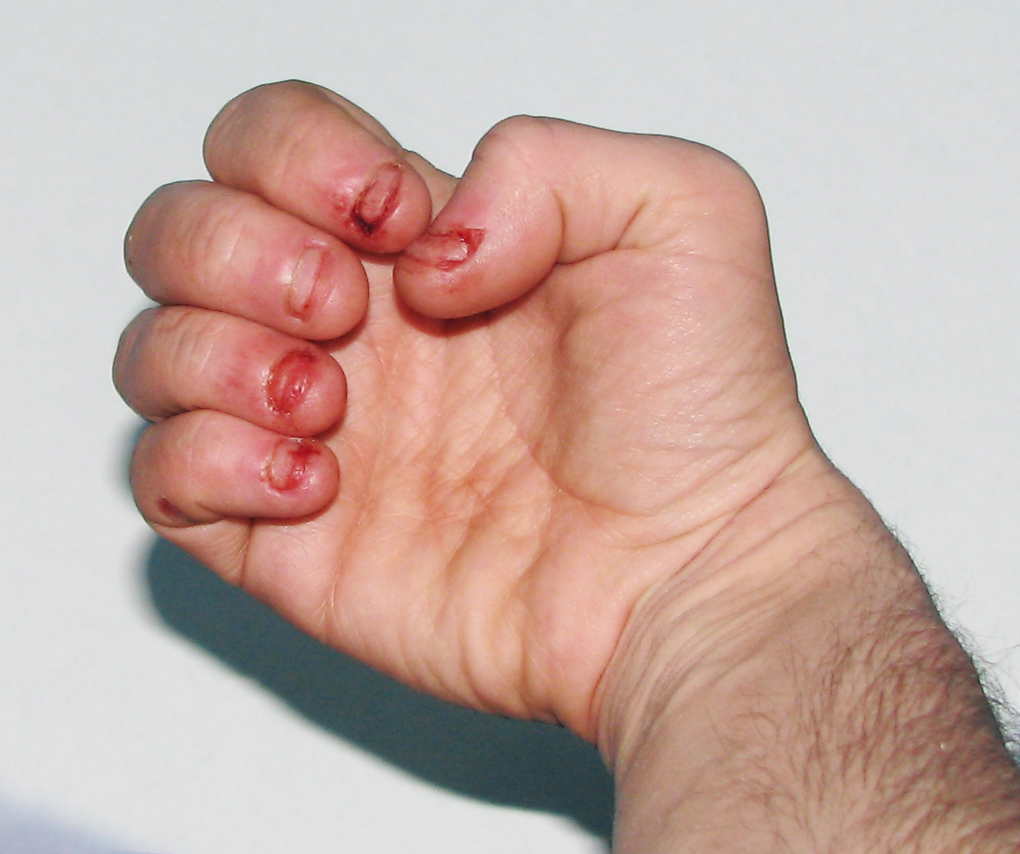
- Extreme nail biting / biting of skin as the result of obsessive compulsive disorder (OCD) or another condition leading to self mutilating behavior such as autistic spectrum disorders (as is the case in this example) or Lesch-Nyhan Syndrome
- Specialty: Psychiatry
- Types: OCD

Dermatophagia (from Ancient Greek δέρμα (derma) 'skin' and φαγεία (phageia) 'eating') or dermatodaxia (from δήξις (dexis) 'biting') is a compulsion disorder of gnawing or biting one's own skin, most commonly at the fingers. This action can either be conscious or unconscious and it is considered to be a type of pica. Those affected with dermatophagia typically bite the skin around the nails, leading to bleeding and discoloration over time. Some people also bite on their skin on their finger knuckles which can lead to pain and bleeding just by moving their fingers.

The term is also used in herpetology to describe the act in which amphibians and reptiles eat the skin they shed, but this is not what occurs in humans. Those diagnosed with this disorder do not develop wounds on the bitten areas of their hands or lose any skin. Instead, they experience a thickening of the skin being repeatedly bitten. Contemporary research suggests a link between impulse-control disorders and obsessive–compulsive disorders, and this was addressed in the DSM-5 when dermatophagia and other related disorders were classified as 'other specified obsessive-compulsive related disorders' and are given the specification of body-focused repetitive behavior.

== Behavior ==
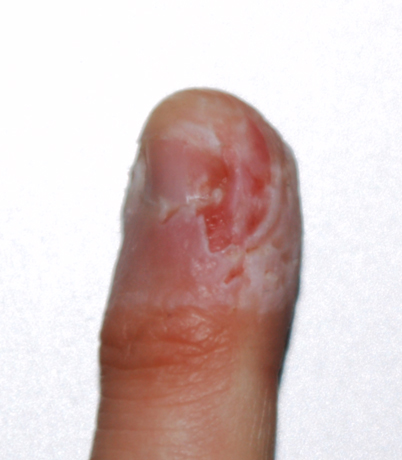
A person with dermatophagia's extremely bitten finger

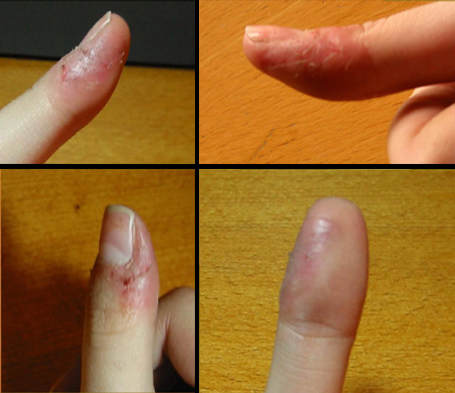
The fingers of a person with dermatophagia. After some time, the repeated biting leaves the skin discolored and bloody.

People with dermatophagia chew their skin out of compulsion, and can do so on a variety of places on their body. Those with dermatophagia typically chew the skin surrounding their fingernails and joints. They also chew on the bottom of their feet/toes, inside of their mouth, cheeks, and/or lips, causing blisters in and outside of the mouth. If the behavior is left unchecked for an extended period, calluses may start to develop where most of the biting is done.

Skin chewing can be bolstered by times of apprehension and other unpleasant events. Blisters in particular can cause a feeling of desire to pull or bite off the affected skin and nails (since the skin is dead, thus easily pulled off), which could be detrimental, causing infection. Another disorder, known as excoriation disorder, the repetitive action of uncontrollably picking at one's skin, can sometimes accompany dermatophagia. Dermatophagia differs from excoriation disorder in that the repetitive motion affected persons partake in is the biting of the skin. People who have dermatophagia can also be prone to infection as when they bite their fingers so frequently, they make themselves vulnerable to bacteria seeping in and causing infection. Dermatophagia can be considered a "sister" disorder to trichophagia, which involves compulsively biting and eating one's hair.

== Management ==
Habit reversal training and variants thereof, like decoupling, are recommended for body-focused repetitive behaviors, including dermatophagia. Other techniques derived from cognitive-behavioral therapy recommend replacing things that do not actually dissolve with edibles that would. Moreover, it has been suggested to delay the urge by chewing gum, or on a soft drinking straw.

=== Management in children with disabilities ===
There is no therapy known to effectively treat dermatophagia, but there have been attempts at stopping those affected from being able to chew on their skin. One notable method that is currently in development is focused on in curbing dermatophagia in children with cerebral palsy. This method is known as the PLAY (Protecting Little and Adolescent Youth) hands protective glove. This method of intervention involves small, non-invasive plastic brackets being placed around the affected fingers. These brackets do not hinder movement or tactile feedback, and they are constructed from non-toxic durable plastic that can withstand the force of chewing. Presently PLAY hands protective gloves exist in concept and prototype only, but this intervention method could improve the quality of life of those with CP-induced dermatophagia.

== See also ==
- Autocannibalism
- Body-focused repetitive behavior
- Excoriation disorder
- Lesch–Nyhan syndrome
- Pica
