= Trichotillomania =

Compulsive hair-pulling disorder

- Other names: Trichotillosis, hair-pulling disorder, hairs-pulling disorder, compulsive hair pulling
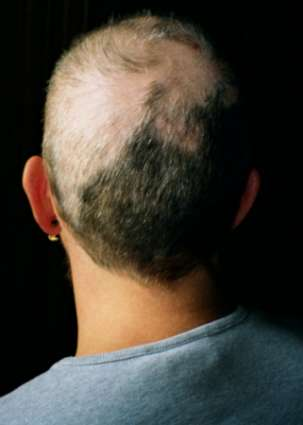
- A pattern of incomplete hair loss on the scalp of a person with trichotillomania
- Pronunciation: /ˌtrɪkəˌtɪləˈmeɪniə/ TRIK-ə-TIL-ə-MAY-NEE-ə
- Specialty: Dermatology, psychiatry
- Symptoms: Visible hair loss, distress
- Usual onset: Childhood or adolescence
- Risk factors: Family history, anxiety, obsessive–compulsive disorder
- Diagnostic method: Based on symptoms, seeing broken hairs
- Differential diagnosis: Body dysmorphic disorder
- Treatment: Cognitive behavioral therapy, memantine, clomipramine
- Frequency: ~2%

Trichotillomania (TTM), also known as hair-pulling disorder or compulsive hair pulling, is a mental disorder characterized by a long-term urge that results in the pulling out of one's own hair. A brief positive feeling may occur as hair is removed. Efforts to stop pulling hair typically fail. Hair removal may occur anywhere; however, the head and around the eyes are most common. The hair pulling is to such a degree that it results in distress and can cause visible hair loss.

As of 2023, the specific cause or causes of trichotillomania are unclear. Trichotillomania is probably due to a combination of genetic and environmental factors. The disorder may run in families. It occurs more commonly in those with obsessive–compulsive disorder (OCD). Episodes of pulling may be triggered by anxiety. People usually acknowledge that they pull their hair, and broken hairs may be seen on examination. Other conditions that may present similarly include body dysmorphic disorder; however, in that condition people remove hair to try to improve what they see as a problem in how they look.

The disorder is typically treated with cognitive behavioral therapy. Trichotillomania is estimated to affect one to four percent of people. Trichotillomania most commonly begins in childhood or adolescence. Women are affected about 10 times more often than men. The name was created by François Henri Hallopeau in 1889, from the Greek θρίξ, thrix (meaning 'hair'), along with τίλλειν, tíllein (meaning 'to pull'), and μανία, mania (meaning 'madness').

== Signs and symptoms ==
Trichotillomania is usually confined to one or two sites, but can involve multiple sites. The scalp is the most common pulling site, followed by the eyebrows, eyelashes, face, arms, and legs. Some less common areas include the pubic area, underarms, beard, and chest. The classic presentation is the "Friar Tuck" form of crown alopecia (loss of hair at the "crown" of the head, also known as the "vertex"). Children are less likely to pull from areas other than the scalp.

People with trichotillomania often pull only one hair at a time and these hair-pulling episodes can last for hours at a time. Some individuals may experience more satisfaction after pulling an anagen phase hair with the gel-like inner root sheath still surrounding the base of the hair. Trichotillomania can go into remission-like states where the individual may not experience the urge to "pull" for days, weeks, months, or even years.

Individuals with trichotillomania exhibit hair of differing lengths; some are broken hairs with blunt ends, some new growth with tapered ends, some broken mid-shaft, or some uneven stubble. Scaling on the scalp is not present, overall hair density is normal, and a hair pull test is negative (the hair can not be pulled out easily). Hair is often pulled out, leaving an unusual shape. Individuals with trichotillomania may be secretive of their hair pulling behavior, which is often associated with shame.

An additional psychological effect can be low self-esteem, often associated with being shunned by peers and the fear of socializing, due to one's appearance and negative attention they may receive. Some people with trichotillomania wear hats, wigs, false eyelashes, use makeup such as an eyebrow pencil, or style their hair in an effort to avoid such attention. There seems to be a strong stress-related component. In low-stress environments, some exhibit no symptoms (known as "pulling") whatsoever, and this "pulling" often resumes upon leaving this environment. Some individuals with trichotillomania may feel isolated, as if they are the only person with this problem, due to low rates of reporting.

For some people, trichotillomania is a mild, if frustrating, problem. But for many, embarrassment about hair pulling causes isolation and results in a great deal of emotional distress, placing them at risk for a co-occurring psychiatric disorder, such as a mood or anxiety disorder. Hair pulling can lead to tension and strained relationships with family members and friends. Family members may need professional help in coping with this problem.

Other medical complications include infection, permanent loss of hair, repetitive stress injury, carpal tunnel syndrome, and gastrointestinal obstruction as a result of trichophagia. In trichophagia, people with trichotillomania also ingest the hair that they pull; in extreme (and rare) cases this can lead to a hair ball (trichobezoar). Rapunzel syndrome is an extreme form of trichobezoar in which the "tail" of the hair ball extends into the intestines and can be fatal if misdiagnosed.

Environment is a large factor which affects hair pulling. Sedentary activities such as being in a relaxed environment are conducive to hair pulling. A common example of a sedentary activity promoting hair pulling is lying in a bed while trying to rest or fall asleep. An extreme example of automatic trichotillomania is "sleep-isolated" trichotillomania, where patients pull their hair out while asleep.

== Causes ==
Anxiety, depression and obsessive–compulsive disorder are more frequently encountered in people with trichotillomania. Trichotillomania has a high overlap with post traumatic stress disorder, and some cases of trichotillomania may be triggered by stress. Another school of thought emphasizes hair pulling as addictive or negatively reinforcing, as it is associated with rising tension beforehand and relief afterward. A neurocognitive model — the notion that the basal ganglia play a role in habit formation and that the frontal lobes are critical for normally suppressing or inhibiting such habits — sees trichotillomania as a habit disorder.

In several MRI studies, it has been found that people with trichotillomania have more gray matter on average than those who do not have the disorder. One study found that individuals with trichotillomania have decreased cerebellar volume on average, which suggests some differences between OCD and trichotillomania. An fMRI study reported decreased activation in the basal ganglia, dorsolateral prefrontal cortex, and dorsal anterior cingulate cortex in people with trichotillomania. Abnormalities in the caudate nucleus are noted in OCD, but there is no evidence to support that these abnormalities can also be linked to trichotillomania.

It is likely that a combination of multiple genes confers vulnerability to trichotillomania. Mutations in the SLITRK1, 5HT2A, SAPAP3, FOXP1, and NF1 genes have been associated with trichotillomania. In addition, HOXB8 knockout mice display pathological grooming behavior similar to trichotillomania, although associations between trichotillomania and the HOXB8 gene have not been demonstrated in humans.

== Diagnosis ==
Patients may be ashamed or actively attempt to disguise their symptoms. This can make diagnosis difficult as symptoms are not always immediately obvious, or have been deliberately hidden to avoid disclosure. If the patient admits to hair pulling, diagnosis is not difficult; if patients deny hair pulling, a differential diagnosis must be pursued. The differential diagnosis will include evaluation for alopecia areata, iron deficiency, hypothyroidism, tinea capitis, traction alopecia, alopecia mucinosa, thallium poisoning, and loose anagen syndrome. In trichotillomania, a hair pull test is negative.

A biopsy can be performed and may be helpful; it reveals traumatized hair follicles with perifollicular hemorrhage, fragmented hair in the dermis, empty follicles, and deformed hair shafts. Multiple catagen hairs are typically seen. An alternative technique to biopsy, particularly for children, is to shave a part of the involved area and observe for regrowth of normal hairs.

Diagnostic criteria from the DSM-5 provides the following criteria for trichotillomania:

- Criterion A: Recurrent pulling of hair that must result in loss of hair.
- Criterion B: There must be evidence that the person has attempted to stop hair-pulling behavior.
- Criterion C: General medical conditions and other disorders that may results in hair pulling must first be ruled out, and TTM can only be diagnosed if the behavior is not in response to another disorder. Examples include delusions, or body dysmorphic disorders.

=== Classification ===
Trichotillomania is defined as a self-induced and recurrent loss of hair. It includes the criterion of an increasing sense of tension before pulling the hair and gratification or relief when pulling the hair. However, some people with trichotillomania do not endorse the inclusion of "rising tension and subsequent pleasure, gratification, or relief" as part of the criteria because many individuals with trichotillomania may not realize they are pulling their hair, and patients presenting for diagnosis may deny the criteria for tension prior to hair pulling or a sense of gratification after hair is pulled.

Trichotillomania may lie on the obsessive–compulsive spectrum, also encompassing obsessive–compulsive disorder (OCD), body dysmorphic disorder (BDD), nail biting (onychophagia) and skin picking (dermatillomania), tic disorders and eating disorders. These conditions may share clinical features, genetic contributions, and possibly treatment response; however, differences between trichotillomania and OCD are present in symptoms, neural function and cognitive profile. In the sense that it is associated with irresistible urges to perform unwanted repetitive behavior, trichotillomania is akin to some of these conditions, and rates of trichotillomania among relatives of OCD patients is higher than expected by chance. However, differences between the disorder and OCD have been noted, including: differing peak ages at onset, rates of comorbidity, gender differences, and neural dysfunction and cognitive profile. When it occurs in early childhood, it can be regarded as a distinct clinical entity.

Because trichotillomania can be present in multiple age groups, it is helpful in terms of prognosis and treatment to approach three distinct subgroups by age: preschool age children, preadolescents to young adults, and adults.

In preschool age children, trichotillomania is considered benign. For these children, hair-pulling is considered either a means of exploration or something done subconsciously, similar to nail-biting and thumb-sucking, and almost never continues into further ages.

The most common age of onset of trichotillomania is between ages 9 and 13. In this age range, trichotillomania is usually chronic, and continues into adulthood. Trichotillomania that begins in adulthood most commonly arises from underlying psychiatric causes.

Trichotillomania is often not a focused act, but rather hair pulling occurs in a "trance-like" state; hence, trichotillomania is subdivided into "automatic" versus "focused" hair pulling. Children are more often in the automatic, or unconscious, subtype and may not consciously remember pulling their hair. Other individuals may have focused, or conscious, rituals associated with hair pulling, including seeking specific types of hairs to pull, pulling until the hair feels "just right", or pulling in response to a specific sensation. Knowledge of the subtype is helpful in determining treatment strategies.

== Treatment ==
Treatment is based on a person's age. Most pre-school age children outgrow the condition if it is managed conservatively. In young adults, establishing the diagnosis and raising awareness of the condition is an important reassurance for the family and patient. Non-pharmacological interventions, including behavior modification programs, may be considered; referrals to psychologists or psychiatrists may be considered when other interventions fail. When trichotillomania begins in adulthood, it is often associated with other mental disorders, and referral to a psychologist or psychiatrist for evaluation or treatment is considered best. The hair pulling may resolve when other conditions are treated.

=== Psychotherapy ===
Habit reversal training (HRT) has the highest rate of success in treating trichotillomania. HRT has also been shown to be a successful adjunct to medication as a way to treat trichotillomania. With HRT, the individual is trained to learn to recognize their impulse to pull and also teach them to redirect this impulse. In comparisons of behavioral versus pharmacologic treatment, cognitive behavioral therapy (including HRT) have shown significant improvement over medication alone. It has also proven effective in treating children. Biofeedback, cognitive-behavioral methods, and hypnosis may improve symptoms. Acceptance and commitment therapy (ACT) is also demonstrating promise in trichotillomania treatment. A systematic review from 2012 found tentative evidence for "movement decoupling".

=== Medication ===
The United States Food and Drug Administration (FDA) has not approved any medications for trichotillomania treatment.

However, some medications have been used to treat trichotillomania, with mixed results. Treatment with clomipramine, a tricyclic antidepressant, was shown in a small double-blind study to improve symptoms, but results of other studies on clomipramine for treating trichotillomania have been inconsistent. Naltrexone may be a viable treatment. Fluoxetine and other selective serotonin reuptake inhibitors (SSRIs) have limited usefulness in treating trichotillomania, and can often have significant side effects. Behavioral therapy has proven more effective when compared to fluoxetine. There is little research on the effectiveness of behavioral therapy combined with medication and robust evidence from high-quality studies is lacking. N-acetylcysteine treatment stemmed from an understanding of glutamate's role in regulation of impulse control.

A study found that memantine, a drug typically used to treat symptoms of Alzheimer's disease, was effective in reducing trichotillomania behaviour. Similar to N-acetylcysteine mentioned above, memantine acts to regulate glutamate levels.

Different medications, depending on the individual, may increase hair pulling.

=== Devices ===
Technology can be used to augment habit reversal training or behavioral therapy. Several mobile apps exist to help log behavior and focus on treatment strategies. There are also wearable devices that track the position of a user's hands. They produce sound or vibrating notifications so that users can track rates of these events over time.

== Prognosis ==
When it occurs in early childhood (before five years of age), the condition is typically self-limiting and intervention is not required. In adults, the onset of trichotillomania may be secondary to underlying psychiatric disturbances, and symptoms are generally more long-term.

Secondary infections may occur due to picking and scratching, but other complications are rare. Individuals with trichotillomania often find that support groups are helpful in living with and overcoming the disorder.

== Epidemiology ==
Although no broad-based population epidemiologic studies had been conducted as of 2009, the lifetime prevalence of trichotillomania is estimated to be between 0.6% and 4.0% of the overall population. With a 1% prevalence rate, 2.5 million people in the U.S. may have trichotillomania at some time during their lifetimes.

Trichotillomania is diagnosed in all age groups; onset is more common during preadolescence and young adulthood, with mean age of onset between 9 and 13 years of age, and a notable peak at 12–13. Among preschool children the genders are equally represented; there appears to be a female predominance among preadolescents to young adults, with between 70% and 93% of patients being female. Among adults, females typically outnumber males by 3 to 1.

"Automatic" pulling occurs in approximately three-quarters of adult patients with trichotillomania.

== History ==
Hair pulling was first mentioned by Aristotle in the fourth century B.C., was first described in modern literature in 1885, and the term trichotillomania was coined by the French dermatologist François Henri Hallopeau in 1889.

In 1987, trichotillomania was recognized in the Diagnostic and Statistical Manual of the American Psychiatric Association, third edition-revised (DSM-III-R).

== Society and culture ==
Support groups and internet sites can provide recommended educational material and help persons with trichotillomania in maintaining a positive attitude and overcoming the fear of being alone with the disorder.

=== Media ===
A documentary film exploring trichotillomania, Bad Hair Life, was the 2003 winner of the International Health & Medical Media Award for best film in psychiatry and the winner of the 2004 Superfest Film Festival Merit Award.

Trichster is a 2016 documentary that follows seven individuals living with trichotillomania, as they navigate the complicated emotions surrounding the disorder, and the effect it has on their daily lives.

"Trichotillomania" is a 2017 song by rapper Marcus Orelias from the 2017 studio album 20s A Difficult Age.

=== Fiction ===
The trichotillomania of a prominent character is a key plot element in the 1999 novel Whatever Love Means by David Baddiel.

Ashley Barret, a character portrayed by Colby Minifie in the superhero fiction series The Boys, is shown suffering from it.

Beth, a character portrayed by Amy Schumer is shown to have it in the comedy-drama series Life & Beth. This is primarily in flashbacks, where she is portrayed by Violet Young.

In the novel Sundance Springs Series: Hide-n-Seek by Mary Ann Jensen, the main character is shown to suffer from the disorder. This choice was based on the author's own experience with trichotillomania.

Skye Riley, a character portrayed by Naomi Scott in the supernatural horror film Smile 2, is shown with trichotillomania.

== See also ==
- Feather-plucking
- Noncicatricial alopecia
- Psychogenic alopecia, a form of baldness that is caused by excessive grooming in cats
- Self-harm
