= Nail biting =

Compulsive habit of biting one's fingernails

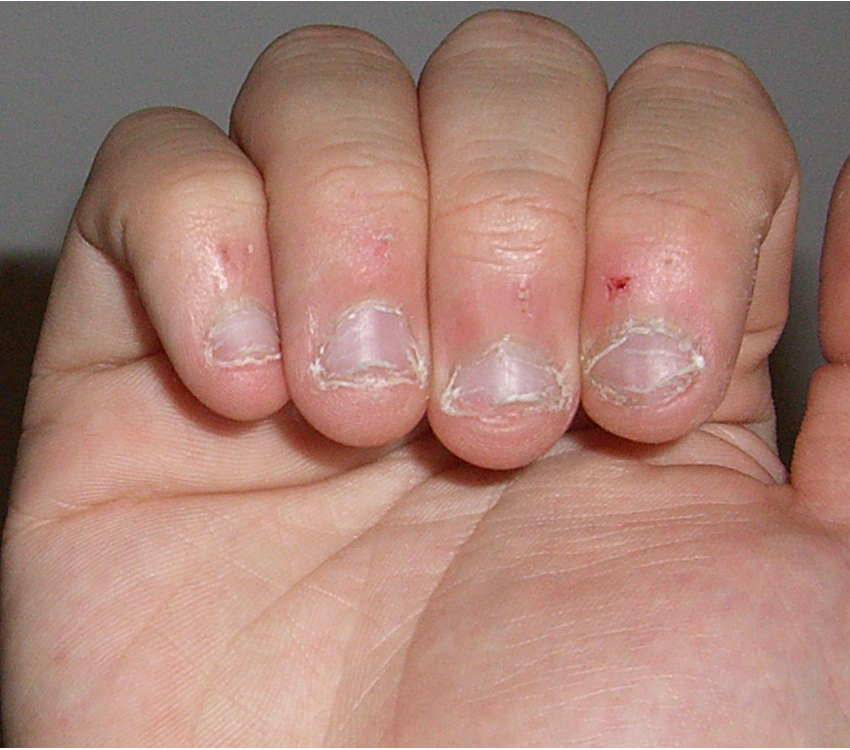
- Fingernails of a nail-biter.
- Specialty: Pediatrics, psychiatry
- Risk factors: Damaged cuticles, shortened and damaged nails, hangnails, bleeding, infections, etc.

Nail biting, also known as onychophagy or onychophagia, is an oral compulsive habit of biting one's fingernails. It is sometimes described as a parafunctional activity, the use of the mouth for an activity other than speaking, eating, or drinking.

Nail biting is a common habit, with it being present in approximately 20-30% of the population, and that statistic only increases to ~37% when explicitly reviewing the demographic between three and twenty-one years of age. More pathological forms of nail biting are considered impulse control disorders in the DSM-IV-R and are classified under obsessive-compulsive and related disorders in the DSM-5. The ICD-10 classifies the practice as "other specified behavioral and emotional disorders with onset usually occurring in childhood and adolescence". However, not all nail biting is pathological, and the difference between harmful obsession and normal behavior is not always clear. The earliest reference to nail biting as a symptom of anxiety was in the late sixteenth century in France.

== Signs and symptoms ==
Nail biting may cause harmful side effects to the rest of the fingers, such as infections. These consequences are directly derived from the physical damage of biting or from the hands becoming an infection vector. Moreover, it can also have social consequences, such as withdrawal and avoiding handshakes.

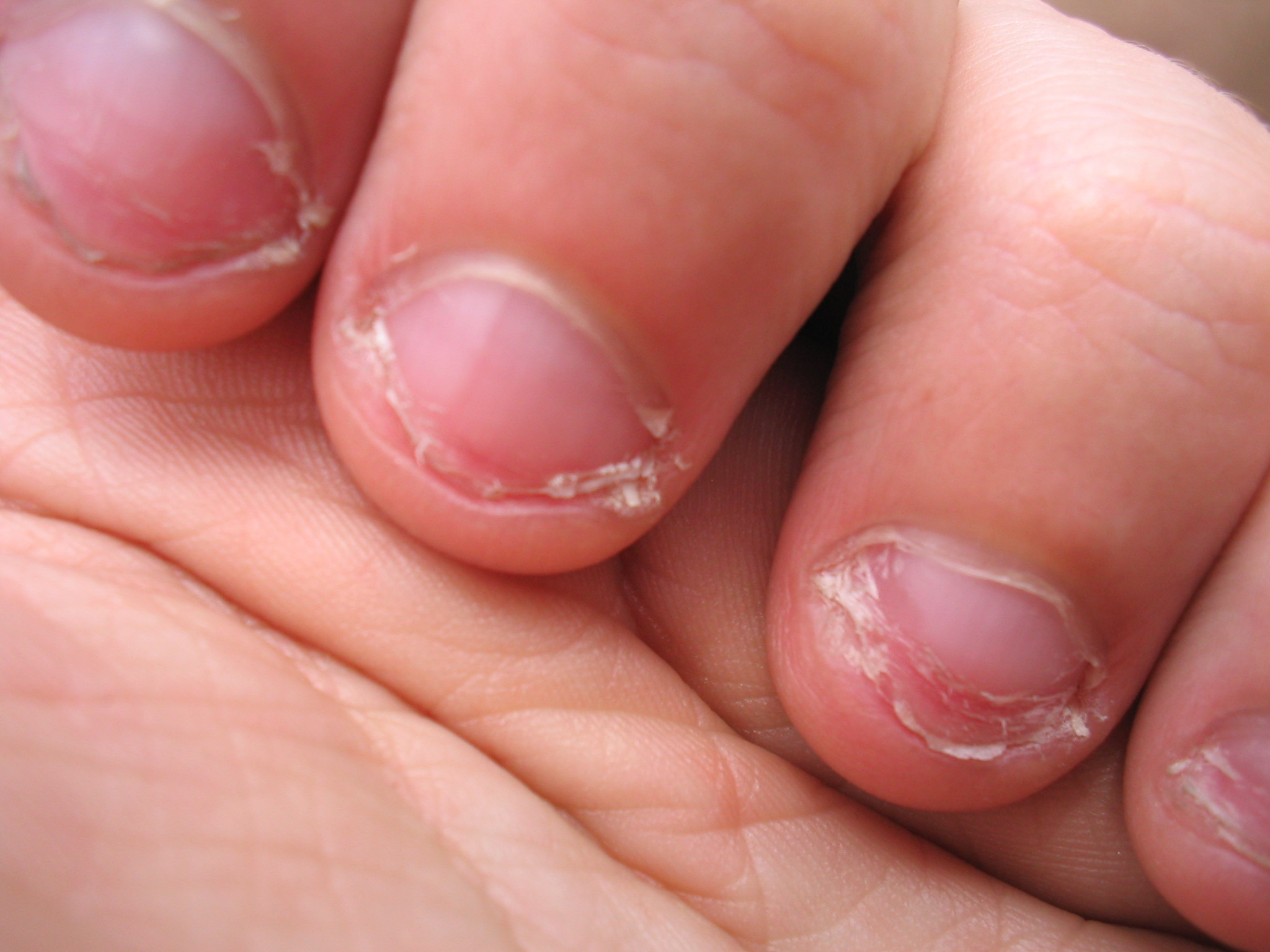
Onychophagy with damage to nail beds but preserved cuticles

Nails are typically bitten to approximately the same degree. Often, but not always, the adjacent skin is also bitten off (perionychophagia: a special case of dermatophagia). Biting nails can lead to broken skin on the cuticle. When cuticles are improperly removed, they are susceptible to microbial and viral infections such as paronychia. Saliva may then redden and infect the skin. In rare cases, fingernails may become severely deformed after years of nail biting due to the destruction of the nail bed.

Nail biting may have an association with oral problems, such as gingival injury, and malocclusion of the anterior teeth. It can also transfer pinworms or bacteria buried under the surface of the nail from the anus region to the mouth. If the bitten-off nails are swallowed, stomach problems can occasionally develop.

Nail-biting can be a source of feelings of guilt and shame in the nail biter, a reduced quality of life, and increased stigmatization in the inner family circles or at a more societal level. Beyond that, however, there is no research to verify long-term consequences that could be attributed to nail biting alone.

=== Related disorders ===
Other body-focused repetitive behaviors include onychotillomania (nail picking), excoriation disorder (skin picking), dermatophagia (skin biting), and trichotillomania (compulsive hair pulling), all of which tend to coexist with nail biting. As an oral parafunctional activity, it is also associated with bruxism (tooth clenching and grinding), and other habits such as pen chewing and cheek biting.

In children, nail biting most typically co-occurs with attention deficit hyperactivity disorder (75% co-occurrence among one psychiatrically referred cohort of nail biters) and other psychiatric disorders including oppositional defiant disorder (36%) and separation anxiety disorder (21%). It is also more common among children and adolescents with obsessive–compulsive disorder. Nail biting appeared in a study to be more common in men with eating disorders than in those without them.

== Treatment ==
The most common, cheap, and widely available treatment is to apply a clear, bitter-tasting nail polish to the nails. Normally denatonium benzoate is used, the most bitter chemical compound known. The bitter flavor discourages the nail-biting habit.

Behavioral therapy is beneficial when simpler measures are not effective. Habit reversal training (HRT), which seeks to unlearn the habit of nail biting and possibly replace it with a more constructive habit, has shown its effectiveness versus placebo in children and adults. A study in children showed that results with HRT were superior to either no treatment at all or the manipulation of objects as an alternative behavior, which is another possible approach to treatment. In addition to HRT, stimulus control therapy is used to both identify and then eliminate the stimulus that frequently triggers biting urges. Other behavioral techniques that have been investigated with preliminary positive results are self-help techniques, such as decoupling and the use of wristbands as non-removable reminders. More recently, technology companies have begun producing wearable devices and smart watch applications that track the position of users' hands, but no research has been published so far.

Another treatment for chronic nail biters is the usage of a dental deterrent device that prevents the front teeth from damaging the nails and the surrounding cuticles. After about two months, the device leads to a full oppression of the nail biting urge.

Evidence on the efficacy of drugs is very limited, and they are not routinely used. A small double-blind randomized clinical trial in children and adolescents indicated that N-acetylcysteine, a glutathione and glutamate modulator, could, in the short term only, be more effective than placebo in decreasing the nail-biting behavior.

Nail cosmetics can help to ameliorate nail biting social effects.

Independently of the method used, parental education is useful in the case of young nail biters to maximize the efficacy of the treatment programs, as some behaviors by the parents or other family members may be helping to perpetuate the problem. For example, punishments have been shown not to be better than placebo, and in some cases may even increase the nail biting frequency.

== Epidemiology ==
While it is rare before the age of three, about 30% of children between seven and ten years of age and 45% of teenagers engage in nail biting. Prevalence decreases as subjects increase into adulthood. Figures may vary between studies, and could be related to geographic and cultural differences. The proportion of subjects that have ever had the habit (lifetime prevalence) may be much higher than the proportion of current nail-biters (time-point prevalence). Although there does not seem to be a gender correlation, results of epidemiological studies on this issue are not fully consistent. It may be under-recognized since individuals tend to deny or be ignorant of its negative consequences, complicating its diagnosis. Having a parent with a mental disorder is also a risk factor.
