= Rhythmic movement disorder =

Neurological disorder

- Specialty: Psychiatry

Rhythmic movement disorder (RMD) is a neurological disorder characterized by repetitive movements of large muscle groups immediately before and during sleep often involving the head and neck. It was independently described first in 1905 by Zappert as jactatio capitis nocturna and by Cruchet as rhythmie du sommeil. The majority of RMD episodes occur during NREM sleep, although REM movements have been reported. RMD is often associated with other psychiatric conditions or mental disabilities. The disorder often leads to bodily injury from unwanted movements. Because of these incessant muscle contractions, patients' sleep patterns are often disrupted. It differs from restless legs syndrome in that RMD involves involuntary muscle contractions before and during sleep while restless legs syndrome is the urge to move before sleep. RMD occurs in both males and females, often during early childhood with symptoms diminishing with age. Many affected individuals also have other sleep related disorders, like sleep apnea. The disorder can be differentially diagnosed into small subcategories, including sleep related bruxism, thumb sucking, hypnagogic foot tremor, and rhythmic sucking, to name a few. In order to be considered pathological, the ICSD-II requires that in the sleep-related rhythmic movements should "markedly interfere with normal sleep, cause significant impairment in daytime function, or result in self-inflicted bodily injury that requires medical treatment (or would result in injury if preventive measures were not used)".

== Signs and symptoms ==
Most RMD symptoms are relatively passive and do not cause any pain. Many patients are often unaware that an episode is occurring or has occurred. The rhythmic movements may produce some bodily injury via falls or muscle strains, but this is not reported in all patients . In unique cases of RMD, they hum or moan while asleep during an episode. Some patients describe the repetitive movements as relaxing and are only occasionally awakened by an RMD episode. Often, it is their partner or parent who first notes the symptoms. Additionally, it is often the partner or parent who led patients to seek medical attention.

=== Motor symptoms ===
Symptoms of rhythmic movement disorder vary, but most share common large muscle movement patterns. Many show consistent symptoms including:

- Body rocking, where the whole body is moved while on the hands and knees.
- Head banging, where the head is forcibly moved in a back and forth direction.
- Head rolling, where the head is moved laterally while in a supine position.

Other less common muscle movements include:

- Body rolling, where the whole body is moved laterally while in a supine position.
- Leg rolling, where one or both legs are moved laterally.
- Leg banging, where one or both legs are moved in a back and forth direction.
- A combination of the aforementioned symptoms

The majority of affected individuals have symptoms that involve the head, and the most common symptom is head banging. Usually, the head strikes a pillow or mattress near the frontal-parietal region. There is little cause for alarm at the movements as injury or brain damage as a result of the movements is rare. Some infants with diagnosed Costello syndrome have been observed to have unique RMD episodes affecting the tongue and other facial muscles, which is an uncommonly affected area. Episodes usually last less than fifteen minutes and produce movements that vary from 0.5 to 2 Hz. Muscle movements during REM sleep are often twitches and occur simultaneously with normal sleep. The position of the body during sleep may determine which motor symptom is displayed. For example, Anderson et al. reported that one individual showed entire body rolling movements while sleeping on his side while displaying head rolling movements when sleeping supine.

=== Sleep ===
Because of the abnormal writhing movements, often patients' sleep patterns are disrupted. This may be due to RMD's comorbidity with sleep apnea, which has been observed in some patients . Many find that their sleep is not refreshing and are tired or stressed the following day, despite getting a full nights rest. However, other patients report that their sleep patterns are infrequently interrupted due to RMD episodes and do not report being excessively sleepy during the next day as scored on the Epworth Sleepiness Scale. Thus, as can be seen, the effects and severity of RMD vary from person to person.

=== Brain activity ===
Rhythmic movement disorder is observed using the standard procedure for polysomnography, which includes video recording, EEG during sleep, EMG, and ECG. These aforementioned brain monitoring devices eliminate the possibility of epilepsy as a cause. Other sleep related disorders like sleep apnea are ruled out by examining the patients' respiratory effort, air flow, and oxygen saturation. RMD patients often show no abnormal activity that is directly the result of the disorder in an MRI scan. RMD episodes are strongly associated with stage 2 NREM sleep and, specifically, K Complexes . Additionally, there is a close association with Alpha waves that contain a mixture of K complexes and arousals, regardless of the NREM stage in which the RMD occurred. The occurrence of these two sequences of brain waves suggests that the disorder is linked to an "unstable vigilance level" throughout NREM sleep . It has been noted that there is a complete absence of any EEG signs during or immediately after an intense rhythmic movement . After the episode, normal EEG patterns return. Functional MRI scans have shown that the mesencephalon and pons may be involved in the loss of motor control seen during an RMD episode, which is similar to other movement disorders

=== Episodes ===
Episodes of RMD are short, lasting between 3 and 130 seconds. Rare cases of constant RMD can last for hours. The majority of RMD episodes usually occur just before or during sleep. Some cases have been reported on rhythmic movements during wakeful activities like driving. When occurring in sleep, RMD episodes are more likely to onset during non-REM, stage 2 sleep. Roughly 46% of sleep-RMD episodes occur only in non-REM sleep; 30% in non-REM and REM; and only 24% strictly in REM sleep. Most patients are unresponsive during an episode and are unlikely to remember the movements occurring upon awakening. In some patients who also experience sleep apnea, episodes of apnea can be followed immediately by RMD-like symptoms, suggesting that the apnea episodes may trigger an RMD episode. Similarly, current studies suggest that external stimuli are not the cause of RMD episodes.

=== Associated conditions ===
The disorder is closely associated with developmental disabilities or autism. More recent studies have shown there is a strong link between prolonged RMD and ADHD.

== Causes ==
The direct cause and pathophysiological basis of RMD is still unknown and can occur in children and adults of perfect or non-perfect health. Rare cases of adult RMD have developed due to head trauma, stress, and herpes encephalitis. Familial cases have been reported suggesting there may be some genetic aspect to the disorder; however, to date, this explanation has not been directly tested. As familial incidence rate is still relatively low, it is believed that behavioral aspects may play a larger role in RMD than family history and genetics. Many with the condition report no family history of the disorder. Another theory suggests that RMD is a learned, self-stimulating behavior to alleviate tension and induce relaxation, similar to tic movements. An alternative theory suggests that the rhythmic movements help develop the vestibular system in young children, which can partially explain the high prevalence of RMD in infants. It has been seen that children who have underdeveloped vestibular systems benefit from performing RMD-like movements which stimulate the vestibular system .

== Diagnosis ==
Diagnosis of rhythmic movement disorder is done on an exclusionary basis in which other closely related movement disorders are systematically ruled out. Because of this, a thorough clinical evaluation is necessary. Often, impairments are not severe enough to warrant this process and so RMD is not often diagnosed unless there are extremely interfering or disabling symptoms. Many patients do not seek treatment for RMD directly and most seek professional help to alleviate sleep-affecting symptoms. To compound the issue, many are often misdiagnosed as having Restless Legs Syndrome or sleep apnea or some combination of the two. Rhythmic movement disorder differs from Restless Legs Syndrome in that RMD involves involuntary contractions of muscles with no urge or uncomfortable sensation to provoke such movement. Additionally, 80-90% of individuals with Restless Legs Syndrome show periodic limb movements as observed on a polysomnogram, which are not common in RMD patients. Rhythmic movement disorder can also have symptoms that overlap with epilepsy. However, use of a polysomnogram can help distinguish one disorder from the other as RMD involves movements in both REM and NREM sleep, which is unusual for seizures. Additionally, patients can usually stop the movements upon request, unlike the movements observed in epilepsy. Other movement disorders like Parkinson's disease, Huntington's disease, ataxia, and dystonia differ from RMD in that they occur primarily during wakefulness and reduced sleep, whereas RMD episodes occur in or around sleep.

== Treatment ==
=== Medication ===
Medication is often not necessary in children as symptoms usually alleviate spontaneously as the child ages. However, because the disorder may affect wakeful behavior, many adults who continue to have RMD may seek treatment. Benzodiazepines or tricyclic antidepressants have been considered as therapeutic options in managing the disorder. Infantile and adolescent RMD respond well to low doses of clonazepam. Prescription medications such as ropinirole or pramipexole given to restless legs syndrome patients do not show any clinical improvement in many patients with RMD.

=== Non-medication ===
Treatment of sleep apnea via a continuous positive airway pressure (CPAP) device has shown dramatic improvement in apnea and nearly complete resolution of RMD symptoms. Behavioral interventions may alleviate some RMD symptoms and movements. In such a therapy, affected individuals are asked to perform RMD-like motions during the day in a slow and methodic manner. In such, patients come short of full rhythmic movements that they experience in sleep. Such behavioral training has been shown to carry over into sleep, and the forcefulness of the RMD movements is reduced or eliminated. Hypnosis and sleep restriction have been used in some cases to good effect.

== Epidemiology ==
Sleep-related movements are commonly seen in children, especially infants. However, the majority of these movements stop as the child ages. Some 66% of infants of 9-months show RMD-like symptoms compared to only 8% of 4 year olds.
