= Habit reversal training =

Behavioral treatment package for repetitive behavior disorders

Habit reversal training (HRT) is a "multicomponent behavioral treatment package originally developed to address a wide variety of repetitive behavior disorders".

Behavioral disorders treated with HRT include tics, trichotillomania, nail biting, thumb sucking, skin picking, temporomandibular disorder (TMJ), lip-cheek biting and stuttering. It consists of five components: awareness training, competing response training, contingency management, relaxation training, and generalization training.

Research on the efficacy of HRT for behavioral disorders have produced consistent, large effect sizes (approximately 0.80 across the disorders). It has met the standard of a well-established treatment for stuttering, thumb sucking, nail biting, and TMJ disorders. According to a meta-analysis from 2012, decoupling, a self-help variant of HRT, also shows efficacy.

== History ==
Habit reversal training was developed by psychologists Nathan H. Azrin and Ronald G. Nunn, who first published a paper detailing the habit reversal technique in 1973.

== For tic disorders ==
In case of a tic, these components are intended to increase tic awareness, develop a competing response to the tic, and build treatment motivation and compliance. HRT is based on the presence of a premonitory urge, or sensation occurring before a tic. HRT involves replacing a tic with a competing response—a more comfortable or acceptable movement or sound—when a patient feels a premonitory urge building.

Controlled trials have demonstrated that HRT is an acceptable, tolerable, effective and durable treatment for tics; HRT reduces the severity of vocal tics, and results in enduring improvement of tics when compared with supportive therapy. HRT has been shown to be more effective than supportive therapy and, in some studies, medication. HRT is not yet proven or widely accepted, but large-scale trials are ongoing and should provide better information about its efficacy in treating Tourette syndrome. Studies through 2006 are "characterized by a number of design limitations, including relatively small sample sizes, limited characterization of study participants, limited data on children and adolescents, lack of attention to the assessment of treatment integrity and adherence, and limited attention to the identification of potential clinical and neurocognitive mechanisms and predictors of treatment response". Additional controlled studies of HRT are needed to address whether HRT, medication, or a combination of both is most effective, but in the interim, "HRT either alone or in combination with medication should be considered as a viable treatment" for tic disorders.

== Comprehensive Behavioral Intervention for Tics ==
Comprehensive Behavioral Intervention for Tics (CBIT), based on HRT, is a first-line treatment for Tourette syndrome and tic disorders. With a high level of confidence, CBIT has been shown to be more likely to lead to a reduction in tics than other supportive therapies or psychoeducation. Some limitations are: children younger than ten may not understand the treatment, people with severe tics or ADHD may not be able to suppress their tics or sustain the required focus to benefit from behavioral treatments, there is a lack of therapists trained in behavioral interventions, finding practitioners outside of specialty clinics can be difficult, and costs may limit accessibility. Whether increased awareness of tics through HRT/CBIT (as opposed to moving attention away from them) leads to further increases in tics later in life is a subject of discussion among TS experts.

== See also ==
- Cognitive behavioral therapy
- Operant conditioning
- Behaviour therapy
- Decoupling
