= Clinical vampirism =

Obsession with drinking blood

Vampirism
- Other names: Renfield's syndrome, Renfield syndrome
- Specialty: Psychiatry

Clinical vampirism, more commonly known as Renfield's syndrome, is an obsession with drinking blood. The earliest presentation of clinical vampirism in psychiatric literature was a psychoanalytic interpretation of two cases, contributed by Richard L. Vanden Bergh and John F. Kelley. As the authors point out, brief and sporadic reports of blood-drinking behaviors associated with sexual pleasure have appeared in the psychiatric literature at least since 1892 with the work of Austrian forensic psychiatrist Richard von Krafft-Ebing. Many medical publications concerning clinical vampirism can be found in the literature of forensic psychiatry, with the behavior being reported as an aspect of extraordinary violent crimes.

== History ==
=== Origin of Renfield's syndrome ===
Richard Noll created the term Renfield's syndrome with the intent to parody what he viewed as 1980s psychobabble, before the joke was taken seriously in popular culture. The original term clinical vampirism was seen as a suitable subject for satire due to its doubtful utility, and has effectively been completely replaced.

The syndrome is named after R. M. Renfield, Dracula's human zoophagous follower in the 1897 novel by Bram Stoker. In a web interview with psychology professor Katherine Ramsland, Noll explained how he invented the term and its purported diagnostic criteria as a whimsical parody of 1980's psychiatry and "new DSM-speak". In a public lecture hosted by Penn State University's Institute for the Arts and Humanities on 7 October 2013, Noll traced the 20-year trajectory of his unintentionally created "monster" from the moment of its creation to the cultural popularity of Renfield's syndrome today. However, some writers have pointed out that it does serve as a useful demonstration of how creating unfounded names for psychological illnesses can have negative consequences.

=== Clinical vampirism before Renfield's syndrome ===
The prior diagnosis of clinical vampirism was somewhat different from Renfield's syndrome. Clinical vampirism usually connoted an erotic obsession with blood; Renfield's syndrome more resembles an eating disorder involving the consumption of blood and/or living animals. Neither clinical vampirism nor Renfield's syndrome have ever been listed as a valid diagnosis in the Diagnostic and Statistical Manual (DSM).

According to the case history reports in older psychiatric literature, the condition starts with a key event in childhood that causes the experience of a blood injury or the ingestion of blood to be exciting. After puberty, the excitement is experienced as sexual arousal. Throughout adolescence and adulthood, blood, its presence, and its consumption can also stimulate a sense of power and control. Noll speculated that his Renfield's syndrome began with autovampirism and then progressed to the consumption of the blood of other creatures.

Very few cases of the syndrome have been described. Published reports that have been proposed as examples of clinical vampirism or Renfield's syndrome describe the case using official psychiatric diagnostic categories listed in the DSM.

=== Back-diffusion into academic literature ===
Clinical vampirism has been referred to as Renfield's syndrome in academic literature since it was adopted in popular culture. The 20-year evolution of a 3-page book section that spread through mass media and then into pages of a peer-reviewed scholarly journal should serve as a cautionary tale about the purported validity of other, similar syndromes.

Philosopher of science Ian Hacking refers to this process as "making up people" and critiques medical and psychiatric elites for the untoward effects of their "dynamic nominalism" on individual lives. Such arbitrary categories create new natural "kinds" of people (e.g., perverts, multiple personalities and so on) that serve larger political, cultural and moral purposes and change with historical contingencies.

== Appearances in media ==
=== Television ===
In an NBC pre-Halloween special hosted by actor Peter Graves entitled "The Unexplained: Witches, Werewolves and Vampires" that aired on 23 October 1994, pages from Noll's book were shown on camera as Canadian psychologist Leonard George summarized Renfield's syndrome.

Characters with Renfield's Syndrome have appeared on television.

- First appeared in a 2005 episode of CSI titled "Committed" (Season 5, Episode 21).
- Was mentioned in a 2009 of Criminal Minds entitled "The Performer" (Season 5, Episode 7).
- In 2010 an 11-episode Canadian television series titled The Renfield Syndrome was filmed in Vancouver, British Columbia, but does not seem to have been aired.
- On 15 August 2012 Renfield's syndrome was the subject of a video segment on The Huffington Post by Cara Santa Maria which relied heavily on Noll's work and a recent scholarly article on the (pseudo-)syndrome published in the Journal of the History of the Neurosciences.

=== Books ===
In addition to references to Renfield's syndrome in psychiatric literature and mass media, it has also appeared in popular literature.

- Horror writer Chelsea Quinn Yarbro published a story entitled Renfield's Syndrome in July 2002, which was then reprinted in an anthology that appeared the following year.
- Jo Nesbo's The Thirst refers also to Renfield's syndrome.
- Junji Ito's Blood-Bubble Bushes revolves around mysterious "blood fruit," which infects the consumer with Renfield's syndrome.
- It is mentioned in a book by Mike Omer titled Thicker Than Blood.
- Crime novel Profile K by Helen Fields is about a killer who is implied to have Renfield's syndrome.

== Psychiatric and forensic contexts ==
Very few cases of the syndrome have been described, and the published reports that do exist describe clinical vampirism as behaviors that are subsumed under more conventional psychiatric diagnostic categories such as schizophrenia or paraphilia. A case of vampirism in Turkey reported in 2012 was discussed as a behavior of a patient diagnosed with dissociative identity disorder and post-traumatic stress disorder. While not referencing the literature on Renfield's syndrome, two Irish psychiatrists surveyed the psychiatric literature on vampirism as evidence of a changing discourse in psychiatry from the narrative of case studies to the depersonalized discourse of checklist diagnostic criteria.

A number of murderers have performed seemingly vampiric rituals upon their victims. Serial killers Peter Kürten and Richard Trenton Chase were both called "vampires" in the tabloids after they were discovered drinking the blood of the people they murdered. Similarly, in 1932, an unsolved murder case in Stockholm, Sweden, was nicknamed the "Vampire murder", due to the circumstances of the victim's death. Clinical vampirism in the context of criminal acts of violence, as well as "consensual" vampirism as a social ritual, have been extensively documented in the many works of Katharine Ramsland. Others have commented upon the psychiatric implications of "vampire cults" among adolescents.

== See also ==
- Clinical lycanthropy – Delusion of being a non-human animal
- Psychic vampire – Creature in folklore
- Vampire lifestyle – Alternative lifestyle and subculture
- Porphyria – Metabolic disorders in which porphyrins build up in the body
- Pica (disorder) – Compulsive eating of non-food items
- Otherkin – Individuals who identify as not entirely human
