= Autophagy (disambiguation) =

Autophagy is a process in cellular biology.

Autophagy may also refer to:

- Autophagia, a mental disorder or a symptom of a mental disorder
- Autophagy (journal), a scientific journal

== See also ==
- Self-cannibalism, the practice of eating oneself
