= Enucleation =

Enucleation may refer to:

- Enucleation (surgery), the removal of a mass without cutting into or dissecting it
  - Enucleation of the eye, removal of the eye that leaves the eye muscles and remaining orbital contents intact
    - Self-enucleation, self-inflicted removal of the eye
- Enucleation (microbiology), removing the nucleus of a cell and replacing it with a different nucleus
