= A Killer's Mind (TV series) =

- Directed by: Vladimir Mirzoyev
- Music by: Ryan Otter
- Country of origin: Russia
- Original language: Russian

Production
- Producers: Vladimir Maslov; Mikhail Kitaev; Olga Filipuk
- Production companies: Zoom Production; Plus Studio

A Killer's Mind (Russian: Внутри убийцы, romanized: Vnutri ubiytsy) is a Russian detective mini-series, an adaptation of the detective novel A Killer's Mind by Mike Omer starring Anastasia Evgrafova and Tikhon Zhiznevskiy. Director: Vladimir Mirzoev.

The show was released on Kinopoisk on February 22 — March 21, 2024.

== Plot ==
Saint Petersburg, Russia. Zoya Volgina, a phychologist and a profiler, and her partner Timofey, are in search of a serial killer who makes puppets out of his victims. His "works" are familiar to Zoya: she has already seen them many years ago.

== Starring ==
- Anastasia Evgrafova — Zoya Volgina, profiler
- Tikhon Zhiznevskiy — Timofey Volokh, Investigating Committee's special agent
- Fedor Lavrov — Marat Apraksin, captain
- Yana Sekste — Katerina Samara, head of Behavioral Science Unit
- Darya Konyzheva — Alexandra Volgina, Zoya's younger sister
- Sergey Shakurov — Nikola, Timofey's grandfather
- Diana Enakaeva — Zoya as a child
- Maria Ryshchenkova — Zoya's mother
- Oleg Almazov — Zoya's father
- Dmitry Smirnov — young Ruslan Golovin
- Veronika Mohireva — Lily (Uliana Lebedeva), prostitute
- Anastasiya Krasovskaya — Nika Savelyeva, a prostitute from Vyborg
- Sergey Gilyov — Kirill Lvov
- Sergey Belyaev — Osip
- Karen Badalov — Valeriy Abramson, funeral house owner
- Elena Muravyeva — Vera Pustota
- Borus Khvoshnyanskiy — Garik Malinin
- Vladislav Abashin — Ruslan Golovin
- Marta Evstigneeva — Alexandra as a child
- Vera Kincheva — Diana
- Valeria Fedorovich — Karina
- Alexandra Vinogradova — Olga, forensic scientist
- Alexander Rezalin — doctor Safrazyan, Investigating Committee's constaltunt
- Mitya Fedorov — Andrey Skorik
- Evgenia Vais — Milana Borisova, police officer
- Maria Dmitrieva — Kristina
- Sergey Churbakov — doctor Urushadze
- Olga Naumenko — Zhenechka
- Gennadiy Smirnov — Danila Makarov
- Marfa Prosvirnikova — Lisa, Zoya's friend
- Ivan Yankovsky — video blogger in Timofey's house
- Yela Sanko — Vera Pustota's roommate
- Yevgeniy Bakalov — Natan Korotkov
