= Autovampirism =

- Specialty: Psychiatry
- Symptoms: Suturing, opening of wounds; self-harm
- Usual onset: Puberty
- Causes: Usually after traumatic incident

Auto-vampirism is a form of vampirism that refers to drinking one's own blood, typically as a form of sexual gratification. As a mental disorder, this is also called as autohemophagia, which is derived from three Greek words: auto, which means "self"; hemos, for "blood"; and phagos, meaning "to eat". Although closely related to vampirism, the two differ in that vampirism is a sadistic act while auto-vampirism is on the side of masochism. Along with drinking their own blood, most practitioners of auto-vampirism also engage in self-harm in order to obtain the blood.

== Background ==
Auto-vampirism is considered a pathology of vampiristic behavior or "clinical vampirism", which also includes any violent or sexual act done to or in the presence of the body of a dead being, not drinking the blood of a living human. Clinical psychologist Richard Noll introduced this term, which was coined after the mental patient who assisted Dracula in Bram Stoker's novel. Auto-vampirism is typically the first stage of clinical vampirism, or more commonly known as Renfield's Syndrome. It is, however, not recognized in the Diagnostic and Statistical Manual of Mental Disorders (DSM-IV-TR 2000).

== Development ==
The habit of drinking one's own blood usually begins during childhood, most commonly as a result of a traumatic event that results in a person linking pleasure with violence and more specifically blood. It develops by first scraping or cutting one's own skin to extract and ingest blood, later resulting in learning where and how to cut and open major veins and arteries for larger amounts of blood. Sometimes, they will also store their own blood for later consumption or just because they like to look at it. Eventually, auto-vampirism develops into clinical vampirism. According to clinical psychologist Noll, this process includes three stages: autovampirism, zoophagia (the progressive paraphilic stage that involves eating of animals or drinking of animals' blood), and clinical or true vampirism.

As the child goes through puberty, they begin to link sexuality to the pleasure that is already derived from vampirism. There is also usually a sense that seeing or drinking their blood gives them power or increased health, as in general vampirism. At this point, it is considered fetishistic.

There are cases where vampirism and auto-vampirism are one of many symptoms of schizophrenia. This was illustrated in the case of a 35- year old woman with schizophrenia who experienced severe depersonalization and auditory hallucinations that commanded her to drink her own blood. Auto-vampirism, for her, was part of a delusion about a purification process.

Auto-vampirism can cause anemia, abdominal pain, nausea, and more. It is difficult to determine all the consequences of auto-vampirism due to the difficulty of finding people who drink their own blood. It is noted that the pathologies that are associated with vampirism are exceedingly rare.

== See also ==
- Autocannibalism
- Vampire lifestyle
