= Renfield (disambiguation) =

Renfield is a fictional character in Bram Stoker's Dracula.

Renfield may also refer to:

- Renfield, a card game
- Renfield, a Peggle master in the video game, Peggle.
- Renfield (film), an American film based on the fictional character
- Renfield's syndrome, a medical condition where a person feels compelled to drink blood
