= Agreste (disambiguation) =

The Agreste is an area in Brazil.

It may also refer to:

- Adrien Agreste, a fictitious character from Miraculous: Tales of Ladybug & Cat Noir
  - Gabriel Agreste, Adrien's father
- Agreste, an alternative name for the wine grape Malbec

== See also ==
- Agrestes, legendary pagan king of Camelot
- Argestes, one of the classical compass winds
- "Argestes" 6th episode of the 2nd season of Succession
