= Andre Thomas =

American convicted murderer on death row (born 1983)

- Born: Andre Lee Thomas; March 17, 1983 (age 43); Muskogee County, Oklahoma, U.S.
- Known for: Murdering his wife, his son, and his wife's daughter; removing both of his eyes and eating one
- Status: Incarcerated on death row
- Motive: Disputed: Drug-induced psychosis (prosecution); Delusions and hallucinations caused from schizophrenia (defense)
- Conviction: November 3, 2005
- Criminal charge: Capital murder

Andre Lee Thomas (born March 17, 1983) is an American convicted mass murderer and death row inmate known for removing both of his eyeballs in separate incidents and ingesting one of them. In 2004, Thomas murdered his estranged wife Laura Boren, his four-year-old son and her one-year-old daughter in Sherman, Texas. He cut open the chests of all three victims, removed part of his wife's lung, thinking it was her heart, and removed both children's hearts.

Thomas, whose mental health problems began with auditory hallucinations at about age ten, was in the ninth grade when Boren became pregnant with his child. They married when Thomas was 18, but they separated soon thereafter. In the weeks leading up to the murders, Thomas had suicidal thoughts, drank heavily, and used cold medication as a recreational drug. In jail, a few days after his arrest, Thomas pulled one of his eyes out of its socket. A jury rejected his insanity defense and sentenced him to death on a capital murder conviction. In 2008, he removed his other eye and ingested it.

Thomas was diagnosed with schizophrenia after his arrest, and his case has raised ethical questions about executing the mentally ill. His trial verdict was upheld by a state criminal appeals court in 2008 and by a federal appeals court in 2021. While he is still under a death sentence, Thomas is housed in a Texas prison facility for inmates with psychiatric problems. Thomas was scheduled to be executed on April 5, 2023. On March 7, 2023, a judge delayed the execution date.

== Early life ==
Thomas was born on March 17, 1983, in Muskogee County, Oklahoma, to Rochelle and Danny Thomas. He had five brothers, and his mother raised the children mostly by herself in Sherman, Texas, which is 60 miles (97 km) from Dallas. His mother was an alcoholic, had depression, and had been sexually abused. When Thomas was a young boy, his home often had no running water, heat or electricity. Other members of Thomas's family had problems with substance abuse and violence. Ten years before Thomas was born, his uncle was fatally shot by Thomas's grandmother's husband.

Despite his domestic disadvantages, Thomas seemed to thrive for the first few years of his life. He attended a Baptist church in Sherman. A former Sunday school teacher described Thomas as a smart and respectful boy, who often answered her questions before she could finish asking them. Family members said that Thomas was a curious person who enjoyed sketching futuristic cars, as well as disassembling and reassembling old cars. He was in the gifted and talented program at his school.

When Thomas was around ten years old, his behavior changed. He told some of his schoolmates that he heard angels and demons arguing in his head. At one point, he said he was Raiden, a fictional character from the video game Mortal Kombat, and he appeared to be sincere in his claim. He started drinking alcohol and smoking marijuana, which may have been an attempt to quiet the voices he was hearing. He was placed on probation at age 12.

By the time he was 13, he had made two suicide attempts by cutting his wrists. He had a series of arrests around age 15, including one for stealing a car. He was placed on suicide watch after developing suicidal thoughts during a short stay in juvenile detention, but he did not receive ongoing mental health services following his release.

== Marriage and continued mental health concerns ==
After Thomas had been dating Laura Boren (born November 7, 1983) for several years, she became pregnant and gave birth in August 1999 to a baby they named Andre Jr., after which Thomas dropped out of school in ninth grade, earned a high school equivalency diploma, and worked several jobs so that he could support Boren and the baby. He married Boren on his 18th birthday in 2001; she was 17. Thomas and Boren lived together briefly at Thomas's mother's house. Two weeks after they got married, Thomas's mother forced them to move out of her house. At that point, Boren and her son moved in with her parents, while Thomas moved in with one of his brothers. Boren and Thomas separated about four months into their marriage. Boren later moved in with a new boyfriend, and they had a child, Leyha Hughes, in February 2003.

After his marriage broke up, Thomas experienced more intense delusions and suicidal thoughts. He obsessed over apocalyptic concepts in the Book of Revelation, and he had difficulty keeping a job. Thomas was accused of stabbing his brother during a fight, but he was not indicted, and his brother was committed for psychiatric treatment. Living on his own, Thomas had difficulty keeping the utilities paid, so Boren began limiting the amount of visitation with his son. Thomas had begun to believe that his estranged wife was Jezebel and that his son was the Antichrist. He thought that the meaning of life was contained in a message within the images on a U.S. dollar bill, and he said he was experiencing déjà vu. He sometimes covered his mouth with duct tape and refused to speak to his family.

In the spring of 2004, still struggling with longstanding alcohol abuse and psychological difficulties, Thomas began recreationally using Coricidin cold medication (dextromethorphan). On March 5, a friend escorted him to a mental health clinic, where Thomas told the staff that he would step in front of a bus if he could not speak to someone. Clinic staff told him he should go to the emergency room, and they had a judge prepare an emergency detention order. Thomas did not report to the emergency room that day.

About three weeks later, Thomas stabbed himself in the chest and went to the emergency room at Texoma Medical Center in nearby Denison. He told hospital personnel that he was trying to "cross over into heaven". When the wound was determined not to be life-threatening, an emergency room physician began arranging for psychiatric commitment. While these arrangements were being made, Thomas walked out of the hospital. The physician notified the Denison Police Department that Thomas might be dangerous, but they apparently had no contact with Thomas, who walked the few miles to his home in Sherman.

== Murders ==
On March 27, 2004, two days after going to the emergency room, Thomas went to Boren's third-floor apartment and kicked the door open. Boren's boyfriend was at work, but Boren was home with her two children. Thomas fatally stabbed her, cut open her chest and pulled out a portion of her lung, thinking he was actually removing her heart. He went to the bedroom shared by their four-year-old son and Boren's 13-month-old daughter, fatally stabbed both children and cut their hearts out of their chests.

After he killed the children, Thomas stabbed himself three times in the chest. Expecting to die from his wounds, Thomas went into the living room and lay next to Boren's body. When he realized he was not dying, he placed the victims' organs in his pockets and walked to his house. Once he returned home, he placed the organs in a bag and threw it in the trash. Thomas called his wife's parents and left a voicemail:

Um, Sherry, this is Andre. I need y'all's help, something bad is happening to me and it keeps happening and I don't know what's going on. I need some help, I think I'm in hell. I need help. Somebody needs to come and help me. I need help bad. I'm desperate. I'm afraid to go to sleep. So when you get this message, come by the house, please. Hello?

Thomas turned himself in at the Sherman Police Department, telling officers there that he thought God wanted him to kill the victims. He said he killed each victim with a separate knife because he thought there were demons inside the victims. If the victims' blood was allowed to mix, he reasoned, then the demons might survive. Thomas was taken to a hospital and underwent chest surgery.

== Arrest and trial ==
Five days after the murders, while Thomas was in jail awaiting trial, he removed his right eye with his bare hands. According to one source, he had been reading the Bible when he came to Matthew 5:29, which said, "If your right eye causes you to stumble, gouge it out." Another source said that after pulling the eye out, he quoted Mark 9:47: "And if your eye causes you to sin, pluck it out. It is better to enter the kingdom of God with one eye than to have two eyes and be thrown into hell."

Psychologists interviewed Thomas to determine his competence to stand trial, and they diagnosed Thomas with schizophrenia. Declared incompetent to stand trial, he was sent to North Texas State Hospital in mid-June 2004. After Thomas spent 47 days in the hospital, psychiatrist Joseph Black wrote to the court that Thomas had drug-induced psychosis, saying that he was competent and that he might attempt to exaggerate his mental illness by engaging in self-harm or other aberrant behavior. Defense attorney R. J. Hagood, who was ill with pancreatitis during the trial, later said he regretted not objecting to the introduction of Black's statement.

On February 15, 2005, Thomas's murder trial began. He was only tried for the death of Boren's daughter. Thomas, who is black and had been in an interracial relationship with Boren, faced an all-white jury. On a questionnaire for potential jurors, three of the selected jurors and one alternate juror indicated that they were opposed to interracial couples marrying or having children. One juror indicated vigorous opposition, noting, "I don't believe God intended for this. We should stay with our bloodline."

Sanity remained a central issue during the proceedings. Thomas's behavior in the courtroom has been described as "almost catatonic at times", and he snacked on Skittles candy during graphic testimony. Thomas's attorneys put forward an insanity defense. The state said that Thomas's mental illness was caused by or worsened by drug use, and they cited Texas law that invalidates an insanity defense if the mental condition was the result of voluntary intoxication. While the defense said that Thomas's removal of his own eye showed that he was insane, prosecutors said that the eye incident was indicative of an impulsive act rather than insanity. Thomas was convicted of capital murder and given a death sentence.

== Imprisonment ==
After receiving his death sentence, Thomas was sent to the Polunsky Unit, the Texas Department of Criminal Justice (TDCJ) prison that houses male death row inmates. He said he continued to hear voices, and that he saw six-inch-tall demons coming out of the prison walls and playing music from the band Queen. He attempted suicide in July 2008, this time by cutting into the front of his neck with a sharp object. The wound required eight stitches.

In October 2008, the Texas Court of Criminal Appeals upheld Thomas's conviction. In a concurring opinion, Judge Cathy Cochran wrote,

Although reasonable people might well differ on the questions of whether this applicant was sane at the time he committed these murders or competent at the time he was tried, those issues were appropriately addressed by the defense, the prosecution, trial judge, and the jury during the trial ... This is a sad case. Applicant is clearly "crazy", but he is also "sane" under Texas law.

On December 9, 2008, Thomas removed his left eye and ate it. Thomas said he ingested his eye to prevent the United States federal government from reading his thoughts. He was treated at a hospital in Tyler and then transferred to TDCJ's Jester IV Unit, which houses Texas prisoners with mental health problems. Thomas's trial attorney said she was glad that Thomas would finally get the psychiatric care they had been requesting.

In early 2020, Thomas's case was brought before the United States Court of Appeals for the Fifth Circuit. Attorney Catherine Carroll said that Thomas's original legal representation was ineffective, as his trial attorneys failed to object to the selection of the three jurors with a bias against interracial marriages. She also said that trial counsel did not present an accurate account of Thomas's longstanding psychiatric problems, did not request a competency hearing, and presented a psychiatrist as an expert witness that did not have expertise in cases where mental illness was allegedly drug-induced. In response to the appeal, prosecutors said that while there was evidence to support Thomas's mental illness, he was not insane. In April 2021, the Fifth Circuit upheld the trial court's verdict.

On October 11, 2022, Thomas's petition for a writ of certiorari to the United States Court of Appeals for the Fifth Circuit was denied by the Supreme Court. Justice Sotomayor wrote a dissenting opinion, joined by Justices Kagan and Jackson, upholding Thomas's claim that his counsel "fell far below an objective standard of reasonableness" (violating his right to effective counsel), and that "seating jurors opposed to interracial marriage violated his Sixth and Fourteenth Amendment rights" (also violating his right to a trial by an impartial jury). The dissenting opinion states that Thomas's counsel failed to properly use their peremptory strikes against multiple jurors who clearly displayed racial animus and openly stated offense towards interracial marriage.

== Legislative and ethical discussions ==
Thomas's case has raised questions about the laws governing insanity defenses, especially on the concept of distinguishing right from wrong. The wording of Texas law was more favorable to such defenses until 1982, when there was public outcry following the acquittal of John Hinckley Jr. after his assassination attempt on Ronald Reagan. Politicians have attempted legislative changes to codify the idea that a sane defendant should be one who appreciates (rather than "knows") the difference between right and wrong. Such wording changes have been rejected in the Texas legislature several times.

While a defendant acquitted on an insanity defense usually goes to a psychiatric hospital and remains under supervision of the court even if they are eventually released, Texas law prohibits the defense or the prosecution from telling jurors what will happen to a defendant in the case of such an acquittal. Texas Representative Senfronia Thompson introduced House Bill 1150, which would have included the wording change from "know" to "appreciate" and would have required that jurors be informed of the possible consequences of acquittal for defendants like Thomas who pursue an insanity defense. The bill was left pending in a subcommittee in 2009.

In a 2015 publication, the Office of the United Nations High Commissioner for Human Rights highlighted the ethical questions in the cases of Thomas and fellow Texas death row inmate Scott Panetti, saying that "through no fault of their own, they are tormented souls suffering from devastating afflictions that leave them unable to think and reason like people who are not so afflicted ... That is greater punishment than any court can impose."

== Scheduled execution ==
On November 11, 2022, Thomas was scheduled for execution for April 5, 2023. On March 7, 2023, state district judge Jim Fallon delayed the execution date, giving Thomas' lawyers until July 5 to prepare a request for a competency hearing.

== See also ==
- List of autocannibalism incidents
- List of death row inmates in the United States
- List of people scheduled to be executed in the United States
