= Vampire lifestyle =

Alternative lifestyle and subculture

The vampire lifestyle, also known as the vampire underground subculture or vampire community (sometimes spelled "vampyre"), is an alternative lifestyle and subculture inspired by the mythology and popular culture surrounding vampires. Participants often identify with or as vampires, drawing inspiration from various media, including gothic literature, films, and role-playing games. The subculture encompasses a range of practices, from incorporating vampire aesthetics into daily life to engaging in rituals involving blood consumption or energy work.

The vampire subculture largely stemmed from the goth subculture, but also incorporates some elements of the sadomasochism and relevant aesthetic known as Vampirecore, which romanticizes vampires in total. Many forums and websites for the communication and relevant discussions for the members of the subculture exist, along with other media such as glossy magazines devoted to the topic.

Participants within the subculture range from those who dress and act as vampires but understand themselves to be human, to those who assert a need to consume either blood or human 'energy' and 'emotions', or both. Though the vampire subculture has considerable overlap with gothic subculture, the vampire community also has overlap with both therian and otherkin communities, and are considered by some to be a part of the latter, despite the difference in cultural and historical development.

== Characteristics ==
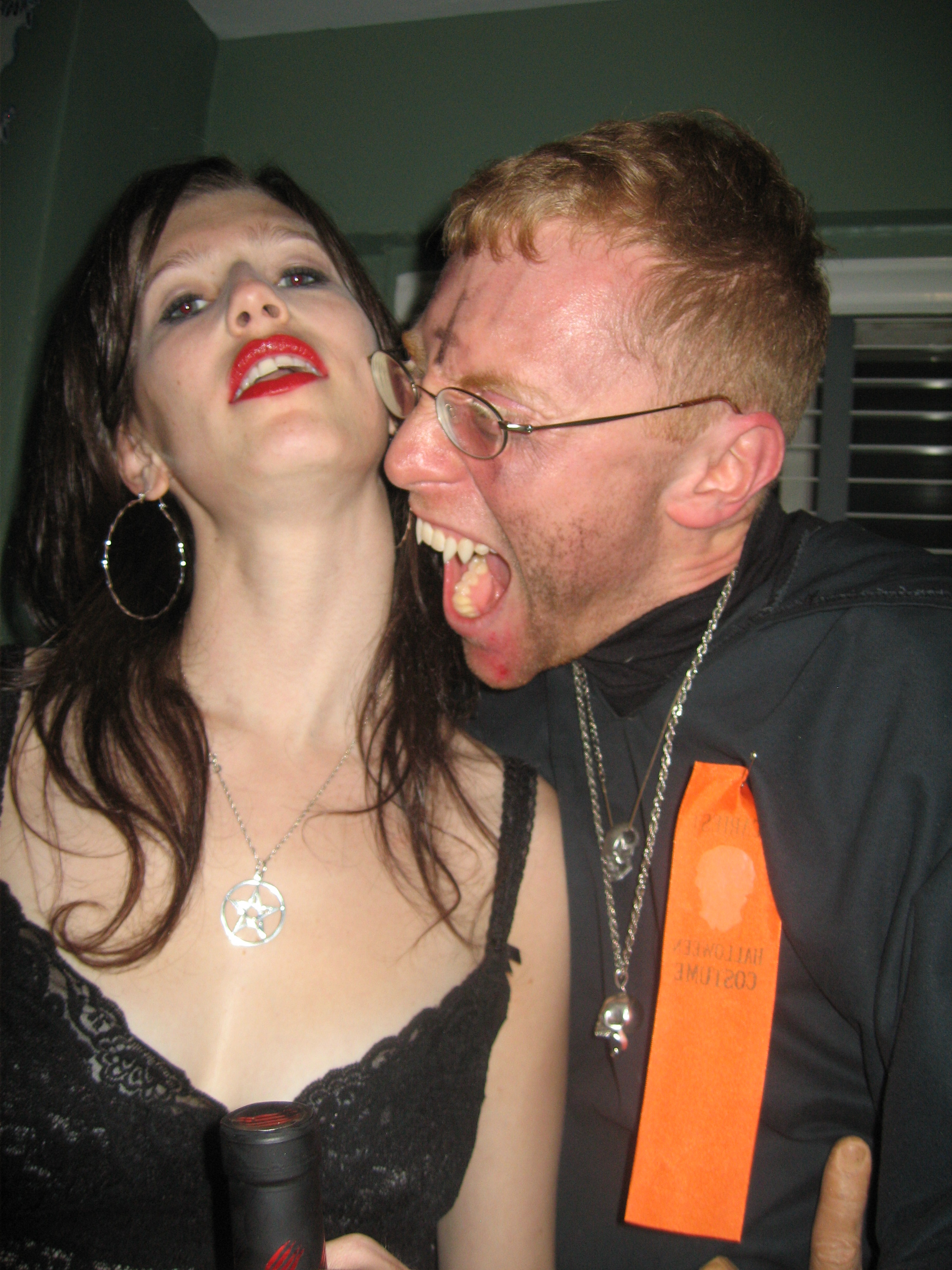
Two people dressed as vampires, one with fangs.

Vampire lifestylers might dress up in 'vampire' clothing, indulge in habits like sleeping in a coffin, maintaining nighttime lifestyle or participating in RPGs such as Vampire: The Masquerade." Some communities of modern vampyres differ by their type, into Houses, that maintain close family-like relationships, Courts, that provide opportunities for community bonding and networking, and Orders, which help the formations of subgroups from various communities.

=== Types of vampyres ===
Members of Vampire subculture may self-identify with labels regarding their proclivities and interests. The following is a non-exhaustive list, and are not necessarily mutually exclusive:

- "Sanguinarians", sometimes hematophages, are those who believe that they perceive a physical/mental need to consume blood (often human).
- Medical Sanguinarians or "med sangs" are a subgroup inside Sanguinarians, who believe that they need to consume blood for optimal physical health, without embracing the vampire aesthetic and sometimes being apart from the Vampyre community, with some individuals seeking for a cure from this condition.
- "Psychic vampires" claim to attain nourishment from the vital energy, aura or pranic energy of others in order to balance a spiritual or psychological energy deficiency, such as a damaged aura or chakra.
- "Blood donors" or "black swans" willingly allow other members of the subculture to drink their blood.
- Hybrids, those who feed on both 'energy' like Psychic vampires and blood like Sanguinarians.
- "Blood fetishists" or "eros" use blood as a stimulant or sexual fetish, sometimes drinking it during the course of sadomasochistic sex.
- "Lifestylers" or "role-players" partake in vampiric personification, which can involve an aesthetic, a lifestyle, and even a philosophical approach (similar to Sangunarians and Psychic vampires), but acknowledge themselves as humans and don't have a need for blood.

Medical Sanguinarians, unlike the classical ones, typically view their condition as a physiological or medical issue, while classical do not. Most vampyres claim that they not always were such, but had "awoken" at a certain period of life, becoming a Vampire. The "awakening" can be triggered by a certain accident, experience or revelation, and a human cannot be "turned" into a vampire by other one, unlike presented in mythology. Some members are accepted into the community as "Inquisition", when they question their identity and not sure to what type exactly they belong.

== Practices ==
The members of Vampire community have different practices of vampirism, depending on their type. Sanguinarians typically consume human blood, provided by a voluntary donor, with special "donor ethics" existing to ensure proper relations between the donor and the vampire and prevent abuse. Sanguinarians also often use animal blood in culinary purposes, with traditional dishes from around the world like black pudding, sangrecita, dinuguan being popular, together with experimental dishes like blood ice cream.

Psychic vampires often feed on donor's "baggage" - 'leftover emotions or energy'. They typically have three different practices, called Grounding (feeding on the "energy of Earth"), Centering ('gathering' energy to concentrate on yourself) and Shielding (protecting yourself from negative energies).

== Sociology ==
Renfield syndrome is a clinical condition marked by a fixation on blood or blood-drinking. Sex researchers have also documented cases of people with sexual (paraphilic) vampirism and autovampirism.
