= A Killer's Mind =

Detective novel by Mike Omer

- Author: Mike Omer
- Language: English
- Genre: Crime fiction
- Publisher: Thomas & Mercer
- Publication date: August 1, 2018
- ISBN: 1503900746

A Killer's Mind is a detective novel by Israeli author Mike Omer published in 2018. It is the first book in the Zoe Bentley Trilogy, the two others being In the Darkness and Thicker Than Blood. Kinopoisk purchased the right to the Zoe Bentley series adaptation in all languages of the world, and in 2024 the A Killer's Mind TV series was released.

== Plot ==
Zoe Bentley, an FBI forensic psychologist, investigates the death of three women in Chicago. They were strangled, embalmed, and posed in a specific manner - as if they were alive. FBI takes on the case and calls Zoe for help doubting the local PD's profiler expertise.

Zoe Bentley is partnered with Special Agent Tatum Gray, whose working style initially creates professional tension. Together, they investigate a series of murders and attempt to prevent further killings. The investigation also leads Bentley to confront unresolved aspects of her past, as connections emerge between her childhood experiences and the present case.

== Adaptations ==
The first TV adaptation of the book was released in February 2024 by the streaming service Kinopoisk. The setting is moved from USA to Russia, Saint Petersburg.

== Reception ==
According to Forbes Russia, the novel outranked books by J. K. Rowling, Stephen King, and James Patterson in Amazon bestellers list in June 2018. In 2020, it became the most best-selling book (among recently published) in Russia.
