= Autophagia =

Self-biting &/or devouring portions of one's own body

Autophagia is the practice of biting/consuming one's body. It is a sub category of self-injurious behavior (SIB). Commonly, it manifests in humans as nail biting and hair pulling. In rarer circumstances, it manifests as serious self mutilative behavior such as biting off one's fingers. Autophagia affects both humans and non humans. Human autophagia typically occurs in parts of the body that are sensitive to pain, such as fingers. Human autophagia is not motivated by suicidal intent, but may be related to the desire to seek pain.

There has been medical research into the relationship of prevalence of autophagia as a symptom of mental disorders including obsessive compulsive disorder, borderline personality disorder, anxiety, and Lesch-Nyhan Syndrome.

Medical research has displayed the presence of autophagia in rats. In a study conducted by Gopal, female rats affected by spinal cord injuries displayed autophagia, by chewing their tails. Similarly, in a study conducted by Frost, patients affected by spinal cord injuries displayed extreme autophagia (i.e. finger and limb biting practices).

There is limited scientific research on Autophagia as the most common symptom of nail biting is prevalent in large parts of society. Hence, research into autophagia tends to be a part of broader questions of 'self injurious behaviour' (SIB), rather than being specifically about autophagia.

People who experience command hallucinations (often associated with schizophrenia and bipolar disorder) are most prone to self-mutilation, including the biting or eating one's own flesh. More examples of people who are very susceptible to severe self-mutilation like autophagia are ones with religious preoccupations, history of substance abuse, and intense social isolation.

== Symptoms ==
Common symptoms in humans include:

- Nail biting
- Pulling hair
- Chewing fingers (in extreme cases, leading to amputation)

== Possible causes ==
This section will focus on the causes for autophagia in humans. There is no single primary cause for autophagia. Due to limited medical research which differentiates autophagia from typical nail biting practices, the causes of autophagia remain broad. There is limited medical research into the ultimate explanation of Autophagia, however, the explanation of the tendency to engage in self-injurious behavior due to mental illnesses is strong. In a study conducted by Nock et al., those who engaged in self mutilative behavior, 52% reported they were attempting to stop bad thoughts and 34% said they did it to prevent doing something they did not want to do. While such motivations exist in the general population, those with mental disorders are a greater at-risk category.

Autophagia is related to impulse control behavior. Impulse-control disorders involve failing to resist an impulse, drive, or temptation to perform an act that is harmful to the person or to others. The majority of individuals affected by this disorder will often feel a sense of tension or arousal before committing the act, and then experience pleasure, gratification or relief at the time of committing the act. Once the act has been completed, the individual may or may not feel regret, self-reproach, or guilt.

=== Psychological model ===
The psychological model suggests that autophagia occurs as an attempt to reduce tension as an outlet for emotional regulation.

1. Feelings of self isolation
2. Psychological disorders: Schizophrenia, OCD. Autophagia can occur as a symptom alongside one of these mental illnesses/disorders.

== Diagnosis ==
Autophagia is not classified as a mental disorder or a symptom of a mental disorder in the Diagnostic and Statistical Manual of Mental Disorders (DSM), the diagnostic manual used in the United States. Since autophagia is not a mental disorder there is not a universally recognized method of diagnosis.

Diagnosis can be obtained through a clinical judgment of a doctor by assessing:

1. The occurrence of behavior: the severity of the behavior can be analyse by the amount of physical damage done to the body.
2. The frequency of the occurrence
3. The level of control that the patient is able to exercise in managing these behaviors: The Yale Brown Obsessive Compulsive Scale can be used to measure this quantitatively.

== Treatments ==
In a study conducted in 2008, the treatment options across five patients were studied. These included prescribing medicines for pain, psychotherapy for impulse control, wearing gloves and doing nothing. Each of these treatments worked with varying effectiveness. Hence, no single treatment option will have guaranteed effectiveness. Treatment options for autophagia include:

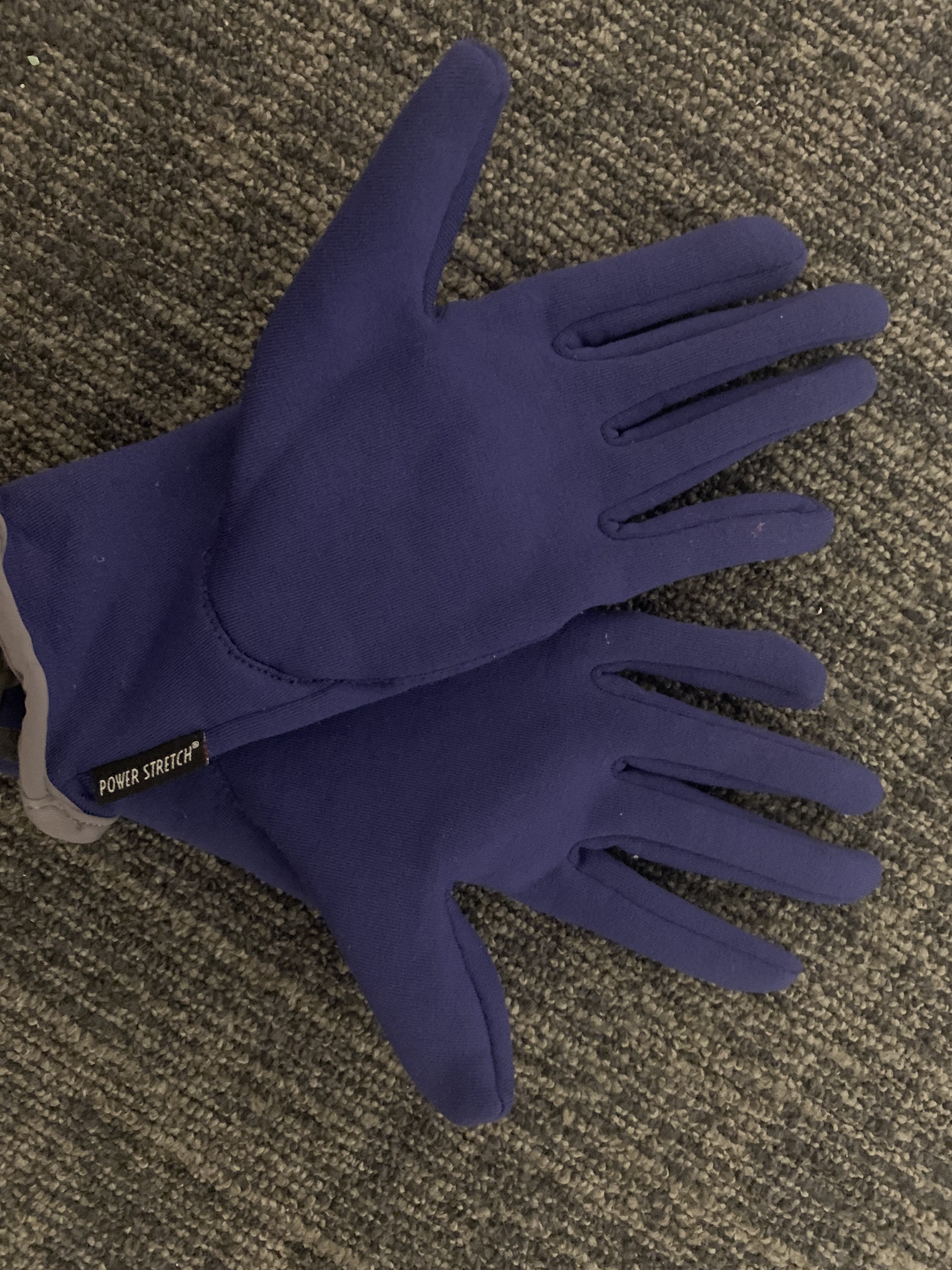
Gloves can be worn as treatment for autophagia, working as a physical barrier between mouth and skin

=== Environmental modification ===
1. Using gloves: creating a physical barrier between human fingers and mouth prevents the individual from biting their skin. However, this may cause skin to heat up which provide discomfort.
2. Sensitization: Sensitize yourself to when autophagia occurs. Attempt engaging in a reverse behavior, such as flexing your toes or clenching your fist.

=== Behavioral modification ===
1. Behavioral management/psychotherapy: talking to a trained professional may help impulse control behavior. This will be more effective for patients with other underlying mental disorders such as schizophrenia, obsessive compulsive disorder, etc.
2. Pharmacotherapy: prescribing medicines as well as psychotherapy
3. Prescribed medicines: Fluoxetine, fluvoxamine. Antibiotics are commonly prescribed for pain management.
4. Reducing hallucinations: In patients with schizophrenia, reducing hallucinations may prevent autophagia.

== Living with autophagia ==
If displaying cases of extreme autophagia, it is likely that individuals have other underlying mental disorders. Hence, to live with extreme autophagia psychotherapy is encouraged to control obsessive thoughts and self harm. However, in benign cases, living with autophagia should not make a material impact to one's lifestyle.

== Autophagia in rats ==
Similar behavior has been observed in laboratory rats in experiments looking at spinal cord and peripheral nerve injuries. The resulting behavior consists of the rats licking and then chewing their nails, and the tips of their toes. In extreme cases, the rats will chew off whole toes or even the foot.

In animals, autophagia tends to be restricted to the hind limbs and the lower parts of the abdomen.

Symptoms include chewing of limbs, paws and tails. In extreme cases the entire tail is consumed. Unlike humans, the causes for autophagia in rats has not yet been determined. However, rats with spinal cord injuries have displayed autophagia as seen in Gopal et al. Rats with fewer lesions on their spinal cords, are more likely to display autopgahia compared with rats who have 100% of their spinal cord affected by lesions.

Potential treatment for rats with autophagia is providing metronizadol, which helps prevent autophagia behaviors as well as it prevent from occurring again. An environmental treatment, is placing a physical barrier of New Skin or a mouth guard to prevent rats from chewing their own skin. After testing this mixture on 24 rats with spinal cord injuries, only one rat had chewed its toes after a two- to three-week period.

Once rats engage in autoaphagia, they continue with self-injurious behavior until the body deteriorates.

Contrary to rats, in humans, there need not be a sensation of physical pain which leads to autophagia. Emotional pain and feelings of self isolation have been reported by human patients of autophagia.

== See also ==
- Autocannibalism
- Dermatophagia
- Trichophagia, eating hair, usually one's own
- Onychophagia, eating fingernails or toenails, usually one's own
- Morsicatio buccarum, eating skin of the inner lip
- Ouroboros
