= Noam Omer =

Israeli artist

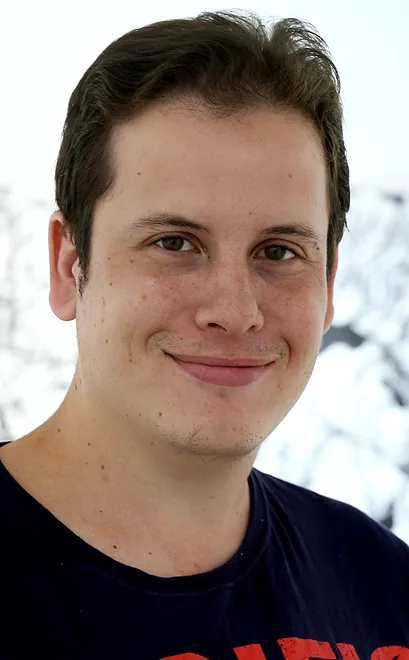
Noam Omer

Noam Omer (Hebrew: נועם עומר; born 1982) is an Israeli artist.

== Biography ==
Noam Omer was born in Jerusalem and raised in Hod HaSharon. His father, Haim Omer, is a professor of psychology at the Tel Aviv University; His mother, Rina, is a doctor of psychology. Noam is the fourth child of five, one of his brothers is the writer Mike Omer.

Omer found his way to art through a personal crisis he experienced. Despite studying diligently throughout high school for his Matriculation examination, he received mediocre grades. As a result, he entered an intense mental health crisis and was unable to function for two years. As part of his rehabilitation process, he studied video editing under the animation artist Shalom Harari. He began creating video clips, combining visual art with music using a computer. He also began painting portraits, and discovered his affinity for painting. During this period, he came to know Etti Katz, an expert of learning disabilities, who discovered his talent and directed him towards an artistic path. She acted as his greatest supporter and his mentor through his artistic journey for a few years. He enrolled in the HaMidrasha – Faculty of the Arts where he met the director, Yair Garbuz, who tailored a personal plan to him and supported him through the course of his studies. The teachers who influenced him most were Eti Jacobi, Miriam Gamburd, Marilou Levin, Yudith Levin, Naomi Siman Tov, Nurit David and Doron Rabina. Over the course of his four years at the college, he presented eleven exhibitions, seven of which were solo exhibitions. In 2007, he graduated from Hamidrasha with honors.

In 2017 Omer won the Ministry of Culture and Sport's young artist award prize.

Between his graduation and October 2021, Noam Omer presented 16 solo exhibitions, including at the Ramat Gan Museum of Israeli Art, at the Jerusalem Artists House, the Tel Aviv Artists House, at the center for art in Kolvenburg, Germany, and at Ha'Kibbutz gallery.

== Art career ==
Ouzi Zur wrote in the newspaper Haaretz: "Every time I stand in front of the works of Noam Omer I am shaken. These paintings are a battlefield between expression and plasticity. When one gazes into them, one feels that their creator is a person without skin, totally exposed to life and to art, as are the works. An anatomy of body and soul, peeled of their protective membrane and continuing to exist in an extreme constant. So must the observer also peel their own protective membrane and surrender to the work. And it would seem as though the term Sisyphean was meant for Omer and his work."

In 2008 Omer's first solo exhibition was presented outside the walls of Hamidrasha: "The World" at the Ha'Kibbutz gallery. It was composed of three different groups of paintings: Forty using charcoal paints, forty using acrylic paints and forty using a combination of the two. The first two groups deal mainly with two subjects: The first with competitive sports and the second with the world of fishing. The sports paintings depict athletes kneeling under the burden of their effort and being carried by their friends or coaches; The fishing paintings depict fishermen carrying their large catch in satisfaction. In the third group of paintings, black figures of mythological monsters and animals are seen over a colorful background.

In 2011 Omer presented the exhibition "Traces" at the Art and Culture Centre Kolvenburg, Billerbeck, Germany. The exhibition recounts the stories of two families: one German and one Jewish, as they experienced and survived World War II from two different sides. The meeting point between them came through the friendship of two of their sons: Haim Omer and Arist von Schlippe. "Pietá", the central work of the exhibition, depicts the rescue of two members of the families: Jechiel Kuperman, Noam's great uncle, who was imprisoned at the Skarżysko concentration camp in Poland and was spared from death by his division's Jewish Kapo, and Gunnar von Schlippe, Arist von Schlippe's father, a Wehrmacht soldier who was saved by a Polish farmer. In a series of paintings, Omer depicts his father in various situations. The series "Grandma Sonia's Via Dolorosa" shows different points in the life of his father's mother, to whom the name is owed, and the anguish she experienced throughout.

In 2012 he presented the exhibition "Sidelooker". In the exhibition catalogue, curator Yaniv Shapira points out that the expression "sidelooker" refers to the perspective of the artist towards his environment, the way he perceives and is perceived by it. This is demonstrated in the works "The Clown", "The Lunatic" and "The Drunkard" which like the artist, hold a mirror up to society and represent the ‘other’ and the ‘different’, similar to Omer himself. One can also see the figure of the ‘observer’ present in them, such as in the large painting ‘The Cave’, in the center of which is a naked person, surrounded by multiple figures: one dreams about him, one sings about him, one looks at him and one stares into the space around him. This is a metaphor for encounters between people who remain strangers to one another.

In 2014 the exhibition "Under the Pillow" was presented at the Ramat Gan Museum of Israeli Art. The image "Under the Pillow" depicts Omer's experience of his existence as being atop of a thin membrane under which lie caves and ruins.

In 2017 the exhibition "The Construction of Man" was presented at the Tel Aviv Artists House. The works depict the façade of a building contrasted with a human being. The figures confront structures from different periods in architectural history. The works do not make use of perspective, but are flattened, creating a sense of disorientation.

The exhibition "Glittering Pain" presented aluminum prints of the Arab cities of Gaza, Mosul and Aleppo after they were bombed. The images are ones of suffering and destruction, but are cast in a bright and shining form, to emphasize the contrast of the images seen on the television from a living room couch or café, where one views scenes of atrocities in comfort.

The exhibition "The Artist and The Muse", which was presented at Artspace Tel-Aviv in 2019, featured large paintings in monochrome colors, black, grey and white in dense and obsessive brush strokes, creating a dynamism which takes over the cloth. The works are crowded with mysterious symbolism, moving between the tragic and the grotesque, and between the absurd and the logical. Mythological heroes make common appearances in his work. The figures and the background seem to feed off of each other and trade roles. The figures exist in a space between the past and the present, between reality and fantasy. Omer draws on numerous cultural sources in his work; From the world of art: Lucian Freud, Leonardo da Vinci, Vincent van Gogh, William Blake, Edvard Munch; From the works of William Shakespeare: Hamlet, King Lear, Falstaff and Macbeth.

In the exhibition "Downtown" Omer presents the city center from two perspectives: on the one hand, a source of consumerist attraction, to which people flock, and on the other hand as a frightening and repulsive place, evoking a longing for the suburbs, which represent a quiet and comfortable life. Omer paints the city as a place inhabited by miserable, lonely people, trapped in a maze of buildings, contrasted with the suburbs, which are a place of unreal nostalgia.

In the exhibition "Nephilim" which was presented at the Jerusalem Artists House, Omer paints a world in constant battle and storm, populated by Nephilim: giant people, but also skyscrapers which embody the monsters of the modern day. The Nephilim have an absurd and grotesque side, which is in contrast with their heroic proportions. The figures blend into the background and are almost absorbed by it. Omer creates his own interpretation of characters from cultural and artistic history: In "Father-Moses", his father sits in a pose mirroring that of Michelangelo’s "Moses". In "Father Crucified", his father is stretched out on the cross, inspired by Matthias Grünewald’s painting "Crucifixion", and the painting "The Birth of Venus", inspired by Botticelli’s "The Birth of Venus", shows a gender fluid Venus, surrounded by admirers, possibly bowing to her or perhaps mocking her. The figures are gigantic, creating an ironic interpretation of the conception of beauty commonly attributed to the painting.

== Solo exhibitions ==
- 2021 "Nephilim", Jerusalem Artists House, curator: Galit Semel
- 2020 "Downtown", Artists’ House, Kfar Saba, curator: Galit Semel
- 2019 "The Artist and the Muse", Art Space TLV, curator: Galit Semel
- 2018 "Glittering Pain", Tova Osman Gallery, curator: Tova Osman
- 2017 "Construction of Man", Artists' House, Tel-Aviv, curator: Sari Golan
- 2015 "Enclosed in His world", Triangle Art Space, Tel Aviv, curator: Sari Golan
- 2014 "Under the Pillow", Ramat Gan Museum of Israeli Art, curator: Ayelet HaShachar Cohen
- 2013 "Tango", Tova Osman Gallery, Tel-Aviv, curator: Tova Osman
- 2012 "Sidelooker", Gal-On Gallery, Tel-Aviv, curator: Yaniv Shapira
- 2011 and 2012 "Traces", Art and Culture Centre Kolvenburg (Germany) and On-Off Gallery, Hamburg, Germany, curator: Yaniv Shapira
- 2011 "Lucian and I", Kayma Gallery, Tel-Aviv, curator: Philip Brandes
- 2010 "Compassion", Shalom Meir Tower Gallery, Tel Aviv, curator: David Sharir
- 2009 "Monkey and Flower", Artists' House, Tel-Aviv, curator: Yaniv Shapira
- 2009 "Fairytale" (Video), Janco Dada Museum, curator: Raya Zommer Tal
- 2008 "Sermon to the Fishes", Installation for the window of the Tova Osman Gallery, Tel-Aviv
- 2008 "The World", Ha'Kibbutz gallery, curator: Yaniv Shapira

== Selected group exhibitions ==
- 2021 "Monochrom: Haadam haroshem" ("The drawing person"), Tel Aviv Artists House, curator: Miriam Gamburd
- 2014 "Outsider Art Fair", New York
- 2013 "War and Trauma", Museum Dr. Guislain, Ghent, Belgium
- 2012 "We have a champion!", Eretz Israel Museum, Tel-Aviv, curator: Dana Heller
- 2009 "Secret Art", Beit Mani, curators: Doron Pollack and Esti Goren
- 2007 "Liminal Work" HaMidrashah Art Gallery, Tel-Aviv, curator: Doron Rabina

== Gallery ==
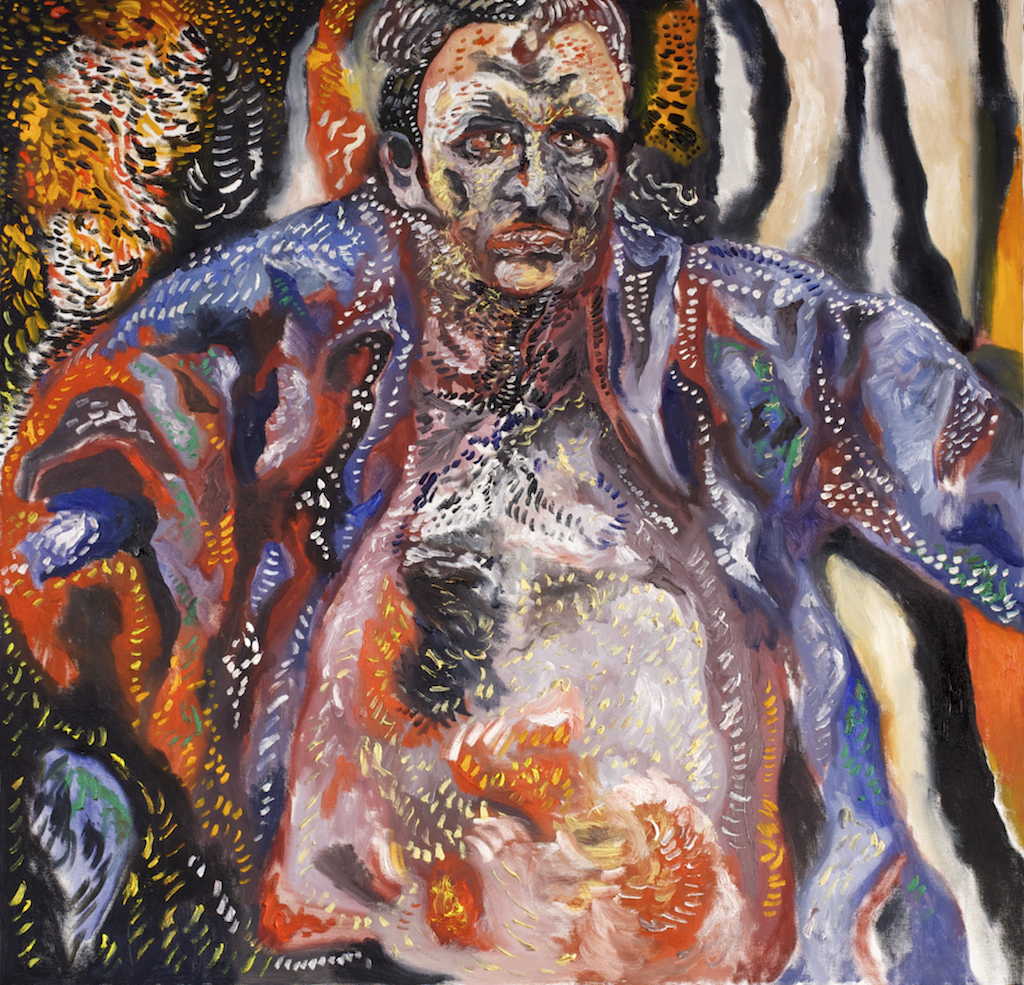
Portrait of Assi Dayan, Sidelooker, 2012 Oil on Canvas, 90x90 cm.

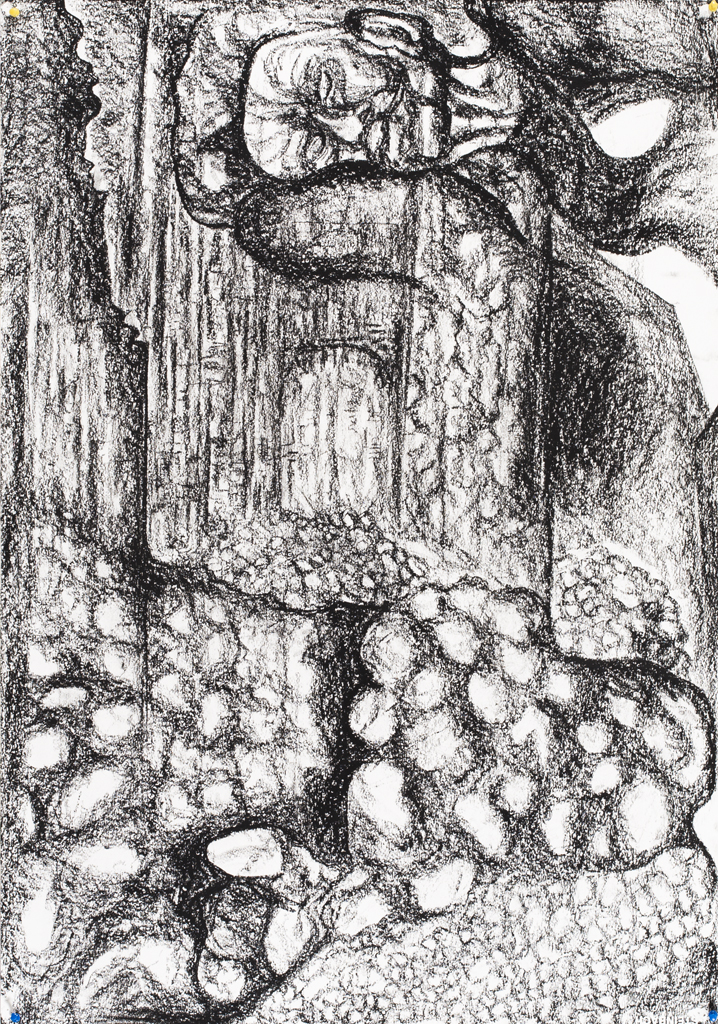
Under the Pillow, Charcoal on Paper, 2013, 100 x 70 cm.

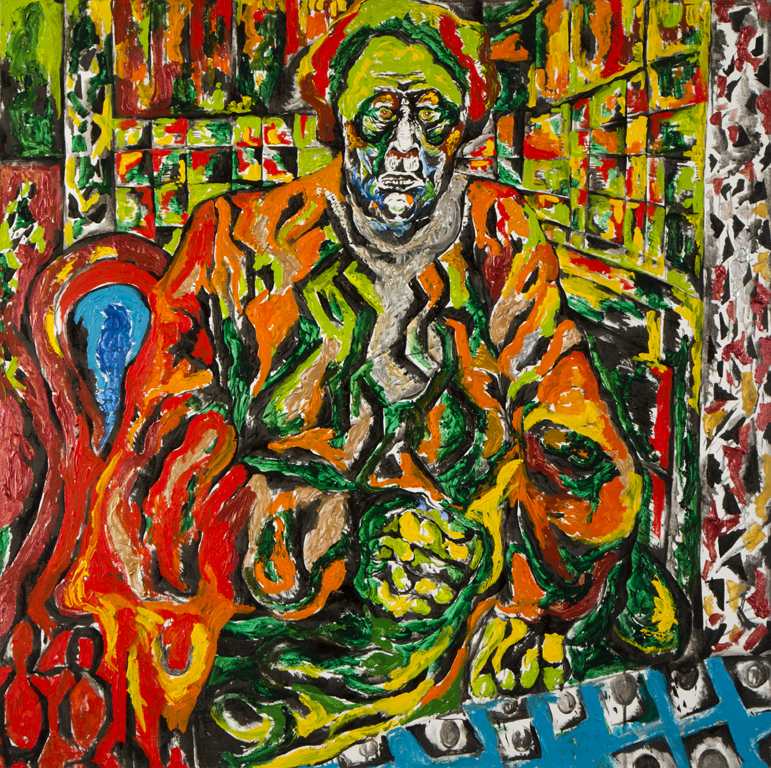
Grandma Sonia Locked in her World, Locked in his World, 2013 Acrylic on Canvas, 100 x 100 cm.

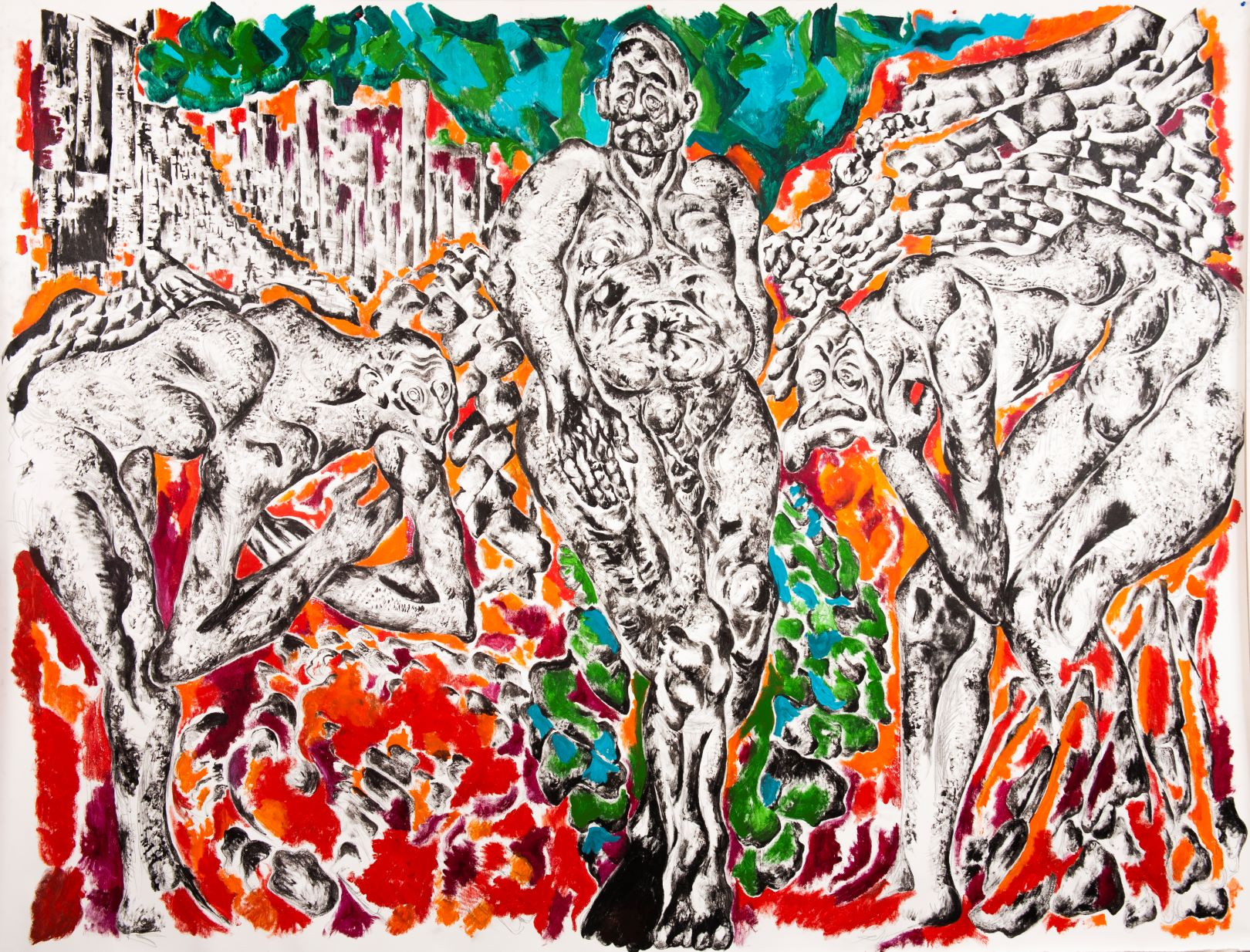
The Birth of Venus, Nephilim, Acrylic and Ink on Canvas 2015, app. 200x140.

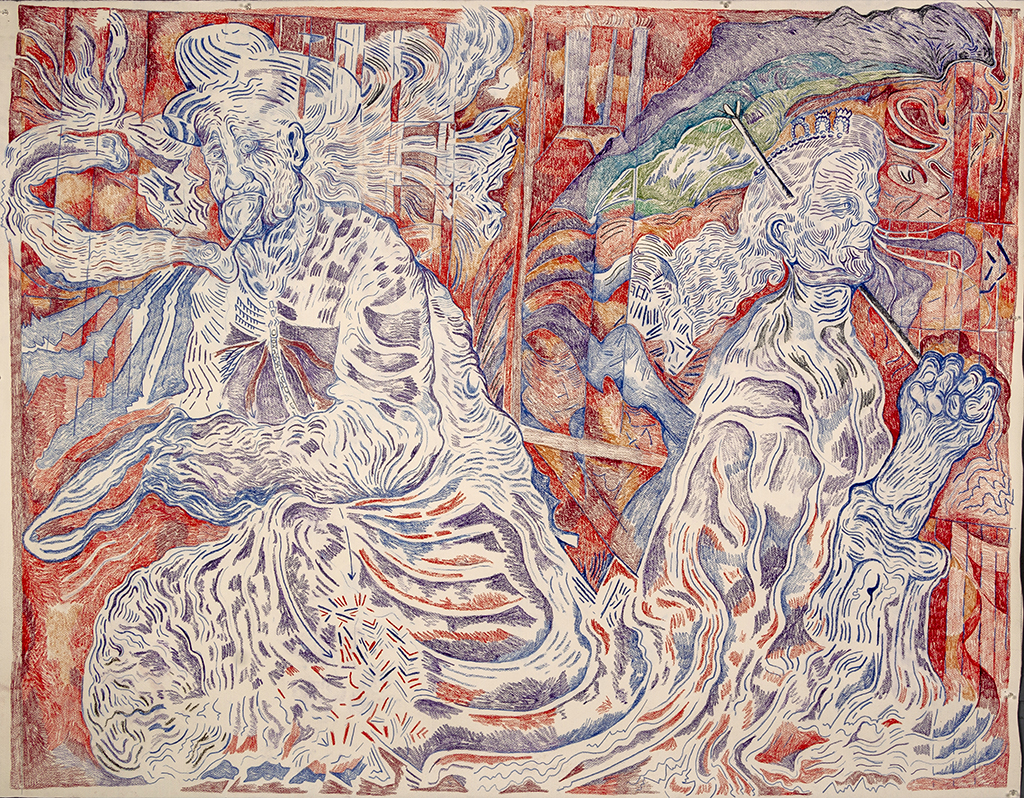
Old couple (2020), The World in Pencils, Colour pencils on pap, 120*140 cm

== See also ==
- Visual arts in Israel
