= List of autocannibalism incidents =

Cannibalism is the act of consuming another individual of the same species as food. Autocannibalism is the practice of (partially) eating oneself, also called self-cannibalism or autosarcophagy. Several incidents of autocannibalism have been documented in the medical and historical record.

== Incidents ==
- Elizabeth Báthory allegedly forced some of her servants to eat their own flesh in the early 17th century.
- During the times of slavery in the Caribbean, a "common practice" among owners was to cut off the ears of enslaved persons who had misbehaved, broiling them, and then forcing the slaves to eat them as a punishment.
- In 1934, a lynch mob tortured and murdered Claude Neal, a 23-year-old African-American farmhand accused of murder in Jackson County, Florida. Before killing him, they cut off his penis and testicles, stuffing them into his mouth and forcing him to eat them.
- There are eyewitness accounts of cannibalism during the Siege of Leningrad (1941–1944), including reports of people cutting off and eating their own flesh.
- In the 1990s, a number of young people in Uganda were forced to eat their own ears upon return after having travelled to Sudan to attend the consecration of an Anglican bishop.
- During the violence that followed the 1991 Haitian coup d'état, victims sometimes had to eat their own hacked-off body parts.
- In 2009 in New Zealand, a 28-year-old man nicknamed "Mr X" amputated his little finger with a jigsaw, cooked it in a pan around vegetables and ate it. Apparently, the act was not brought on by drugs consumption or drinking problems. The man had a personal crisis in 2008 and, while suffering from insomnia and suicidal ideation, he fantasized about cutting his fingers. After the act, he felt relief and initially was excited, but not sexually. Later, the patient regretted the act. The incident was described as the first incident of autocannibalism in New Zealand.
- In 2014, a 34-year-old prisoner cut his thigh with a knife and had eaten the flesh about one hour after cutting the tissue.
- A 66-year-old man mutilated his fingers by biting them for six years, resulting in loss of the terminal phalanges of all fingers on both hands.
- Andre Thomas, a convicted murderer and death row inmate from Grayson County, Texas, removed his left eye on 9 December 2008. He had already removed his right eye in 2004 after murdering his estranged wife and two children. After he removed his second eye, he ate it.
- David Playpenz, of Colchester, England, lost one of his fingers in a motorcycle accident. After asking for his amputated finger, he took it home and boiled it and ate the finger. Before that, he took a photo of the finger and posted on Facebook.
- 21-year-old Brendan Higginbotham of County Kildare, Ireland, was tortured by criminals in 2011. He had a rope tied around his neck and arms and was beaten with a sledgehammer and iron bar. The criminals sliced a portion of Higginbotham's ears and forced him to eat it. He lost half of his right ear and had to undergo plastic surgery.
- In 2012, 29-year-old Jargget Washington of Jersey City, United States, while high on PCP, stripped naked and tried to pull a driver out of a car. He was brought to Jersey City Medical Center, from which he was medically and psychologically cleared. While at a holding cell, he ate his medical bracelet and attempted to free himself from handcuffs by chewing on his wrists. While being transported to jail, he defecated in the police vehicle. After he was placed in jail, he gnawed off one of his fingers and swallowed it.
- Jimmy Prout was murdered by Zahid Zaman and Ann Corbett in February 2016 in North Shields, England, after a campaign of prolonged torture which included severing one of his testicles and forcing him to eat it.
- In July 2016, the Reddit user u/IncrediblyShinyShart consumed his amputated foot with 10 of his friends. His foot was shattered in an accident three weeks earlier, and the doctors suggested it be amputated. He subsequently asked his friends, "Remember how we always talked about how, if we ever had the chance to ethically eat human meat, would you do it?"
- In spring 2023, a Spanish influencer, Paula Gonu, ate her knee cartilage in spaghetti Bolognese after the cartilage had been removed in knee surgery.
- FSB agents cut off the ear of Saidakrami Rachabalizoda, one of the suspected perpetrators of the March 2024 Crocus City Hall attack, and forced him to eat it.

== See also ==
- Autocannibalism
- Cannibalism (in general)
- Human cannibalism
- List of incidents of cannibalism
