= Leonard George =

Canadian psychologist (born 1957)

Leonard George (born 1957) is a Canadian psychologist and schizophrenia researcher based in Vancouver, British Columbia, best known for his writing and lectures on varieties of anomalous phenomena, spirituality, psychology and history. In the 1990s, he was a noted broadcaster in Canada, appearing on radio and television in that country and in the United States where he appeared on national programs such as a highly rated NBC special hosted by actor Peter Graves in October 1994.

He is the author of two extensively annotated reference works on paranormal experience and religious history. The Washington Post included his Crimes of Perception: An Encyclopedia of Heresies and Heretics in a 1995 round-up of notable religion themed books. This volume also appeared in British (London: Robson Books, 1995; Northam: Roundhouse, 2001) and several Spanish-language editions published in Spain and Mexico (Barcelona: Robinbook, 1998; Barcelona: Editorial Oceano, 1999; Mexico: Oceano, 1999). His second reference work, Alternative Realities: The Paranormal, The Mystic and the Transcendent in Human Experience (1995) was republished in a Book-of-the-Month Club edition in 1996.

George completed his B.Sc. in psychology at the University of Toronto in 1979. He earned his M.A. (1980) and Ph.D. (1985) in clinical psychology at the University of Western Ontario. He completed a one-year postdoctoral residency in 1986 at Victoria Hospital in London, Ontario, and completed licensing requirements and became a Registered Psychologist in both Ontario (1986) and British Columbia (1990). In addition to his clinical career, George is noted for his early experimental work and publications on the cognition of schizophrenia. He also conducted some of the earliest research on practice effects in mental imagery enhancement training His summaries of the relationship of cognitive variables such as mental imagery enhancement training, altered states of consciousness and expectancy to psi were also among the first reviews of the experimental literature on these topics. In recent years George has made contributions to the cognitive science of religion through his application of findings from experimental research to interpretations of Neoplatonic texts through publications and presentations at the annual conferences of the International Society for Neoplatonic Studies (in 2003, 2005, 2009, and 2016), the Association for the Study of Esotericism (2014) and the American Academy of Religion (2015).

From 1980 to 1981, George was a Research Fellow at the Foundation for Research on the Nature of Man in Durham, North Carolina. This was parapsychologist J.B. Rhine's Institute for Parapsychology, now renamed the Rhine Research Center.

Between 2013 and 2017, he was Chair of the Department of Psychology at Capilano University. In 2017 he became Chair of the School of Social Sciences at Capilano University. George retired from full-time teaching at Capilano in April 2018.

George has offered seminars across North America and Europe and in places as diverse as Alexandria, Egypt, and Iceland. Many of these were part of the eleven Esoteric Quest programs of the New York Open Center he has served as a presenter or advisor beginning in 2000.

In July 2017, George delivered an invited presentation at the Institute of Philosophy, the Mongolian Academy of Sciences, in Ulaanbaatar, Mongolia. He was invited to do so by Chuluunbaatar Gelegpil, Mongolia's Minister of Education and Culture. Accompanied by American psychologist and historian of medicine Richard Noll, George also conducted anthropological fieldwork among Mongol shamans and Buddhist lamas in areas outside Ulaanbaatar and in the eastern Gobi near Sainshand in Dornogovi province. Seven short videos of Mongol shamans performing a summer solstice ritual (Ulaan Tergel) on 21 June 2017 are available online.

== Bibliography ==
- Alternative Realities: The Paranormal, the Mystic and the Transcendent in Human Experience. New York: Facts on File, 1995. ISBN 0-8160-2828-1 (hardcover); ISBN 0-8160-3213-0 (paperback)
- Crimes of Perception: An Encyclopedia of Heresies and Heretics. New York: Paragon House, 1995. ISBN 1-55778-519-8; (British edition) Northam: Roundhouse, 2001): ISBN 1-55778-519-8
- Enciclopedia de los herejas y las herjias. Translated by Jose Antonio Bravo. Barcelona: Editorial Oceano, 1999. ISBN 970-651-309-4
