= Atlas Vampire =

Unidentified murderer

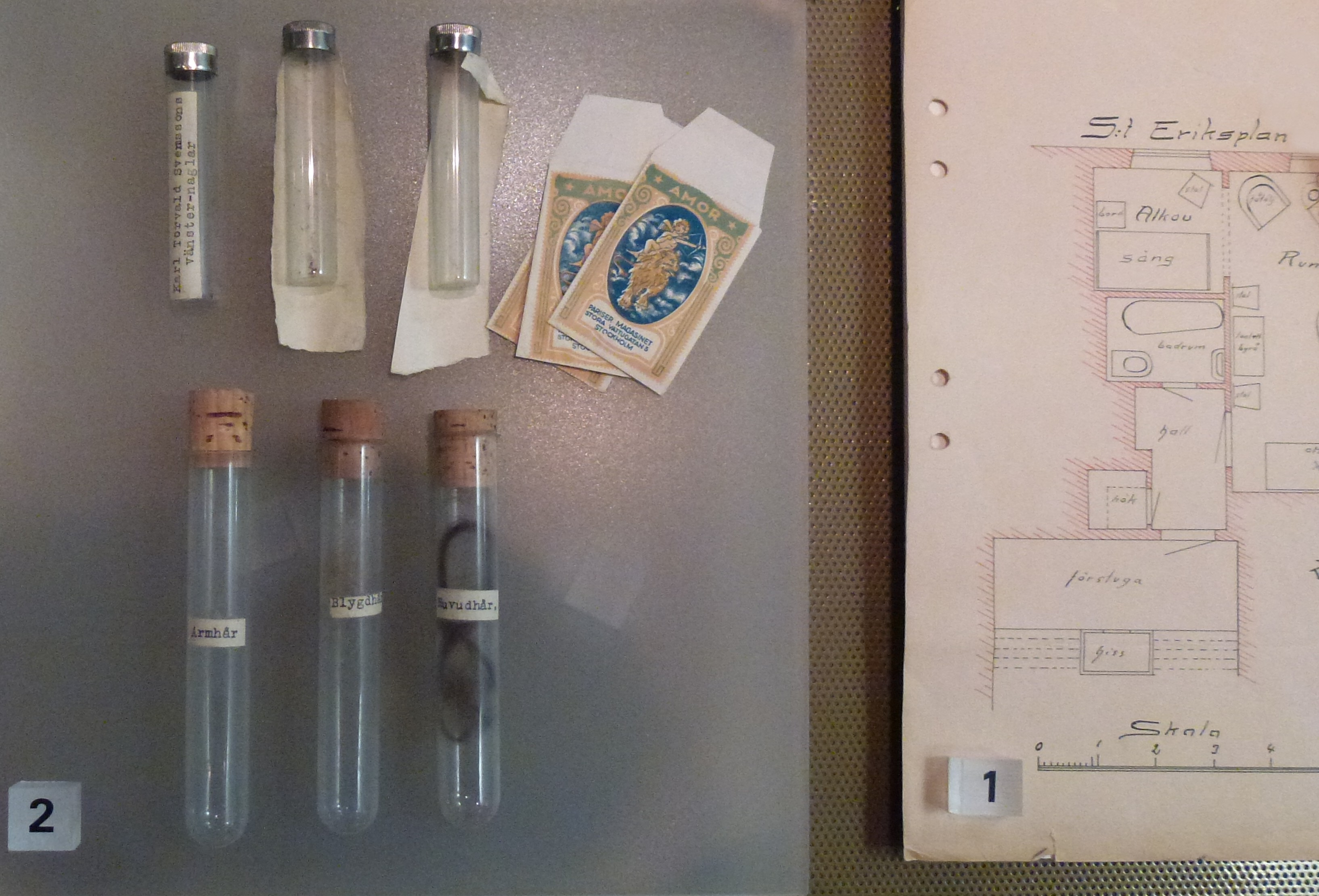
Layout of flat and samples of evidence taken from the crime scene, on display at Stockholm's Police Museum

The Atlas Vampire was an unknown assailant who committed the unsolved "Vampire Murder" in Stockholm, Sweden.

On May 4, 1932, a 32-year-old prostitute Lilly Lindeström was found murdered in her small apartment in the Atlas neighborhood of Stockholm near Sankt Eriksplan. She had been dead for two or three days before police broke into her apartment. She had died of blunt force trauma to her head. Lindeström was found completely naked and face-down on her bed.

According to reports, sexual activity had taken place, with a condom found to be protruding from her anus. The detectives noted how a gravy ladle was found at the scene. Further inspection realizes much of her blood had been drained from the body. Police suspected the perpetrator may have used the ladle to drink Lindeström's blood.

Various known clients fell under suspicion, but after a lengthy investigation, none were charged with her murder. The murder remains unsolved.

== See also ==
- List of unsolved murders (1900-1979)

== Notes ==
- Heed, Börje (1989). Brottsplats Stockholm: kriminalhistorier från sena söndagskvällar i Radio Stockholm. [1] (in Swedish). Stockholm: Sveriges Radio. ISBN 91-522-1683-7.
- Linnell, Stig (1994). Stockholms spökhus och andra ruskiga ställen (in Swedish) (2nd ed.). Stockholm: Rabén Prisma. ISBN 91-518-2738-7.
