= Autocannibalism =

Practice of eating oneself

Autocannibalism, also known as self-cannibalism and autosarcophagy, is the practice of eating parts of one's own body. Generally, only the consumption of flesh (including organ meat such as heart or liver) by an individual of the same species is considered cannibalism. In line with this usage, self-cannibalism means the consumption of flesh from one's own body. While some texts use this strict definition, others use the term autocannibalism in a wider sense that includes the consumption of hair or nails from one's own body.

Both humans and some animal species occasionally practice self-cannibalism. In humans, it can be a symptom of a mental disorder, but there are also a handful of people who have voluntarily consumed an amputated body part. In other cases, people were forced to eat parts of themselves as a form of torture.

A similar term that is applied differently is autophagy, which specifically denotes the normal process of self-degradation by cells. While typically used only for this specific process, autophagy has nonetheless occasionally been used as a general synonym for self-cannibalism.

== Humans ==
=== As a disorder or symptom thereof ===
Fingernail-biting that develops into fingernail-eating is a form of pica. Other forms of pica include dermatophagia (biting or eating one's skin) and trichophagia (eating one's hair). The latter can lead to hairballs in one's stomach. If untreated, this can cause death due to excessive hair buildup.

Self-cannibalism can be a form of self-harm and a symptom of a mental disorder. Some also consider it a mental disorder in its own right, but it is not listed in the widely used DSM-5 (Diagnostic and Statistical Manual of Mental Disorders, Fifth Edition).

=== As a choice ===
Some people will engage in self-cannibalism as an extreme form of body modification, for example, by ingesting parts of their own skin. In very rare cases, people have eaten a part of their own body (such as a foot) that had to be amputated for medical reasons; such acts may be motivated by curiosity or a desire to attract attention. It has been argued that such cases are ethically acceptable because the resultant meat was taken from a person who is still alive and who gave consent for their flesh to be eaten.

Some people drink their own blood, a practice called autovampirism, but sucking blood from wounds is generally not considered cannibalism.

=== As a crime ===
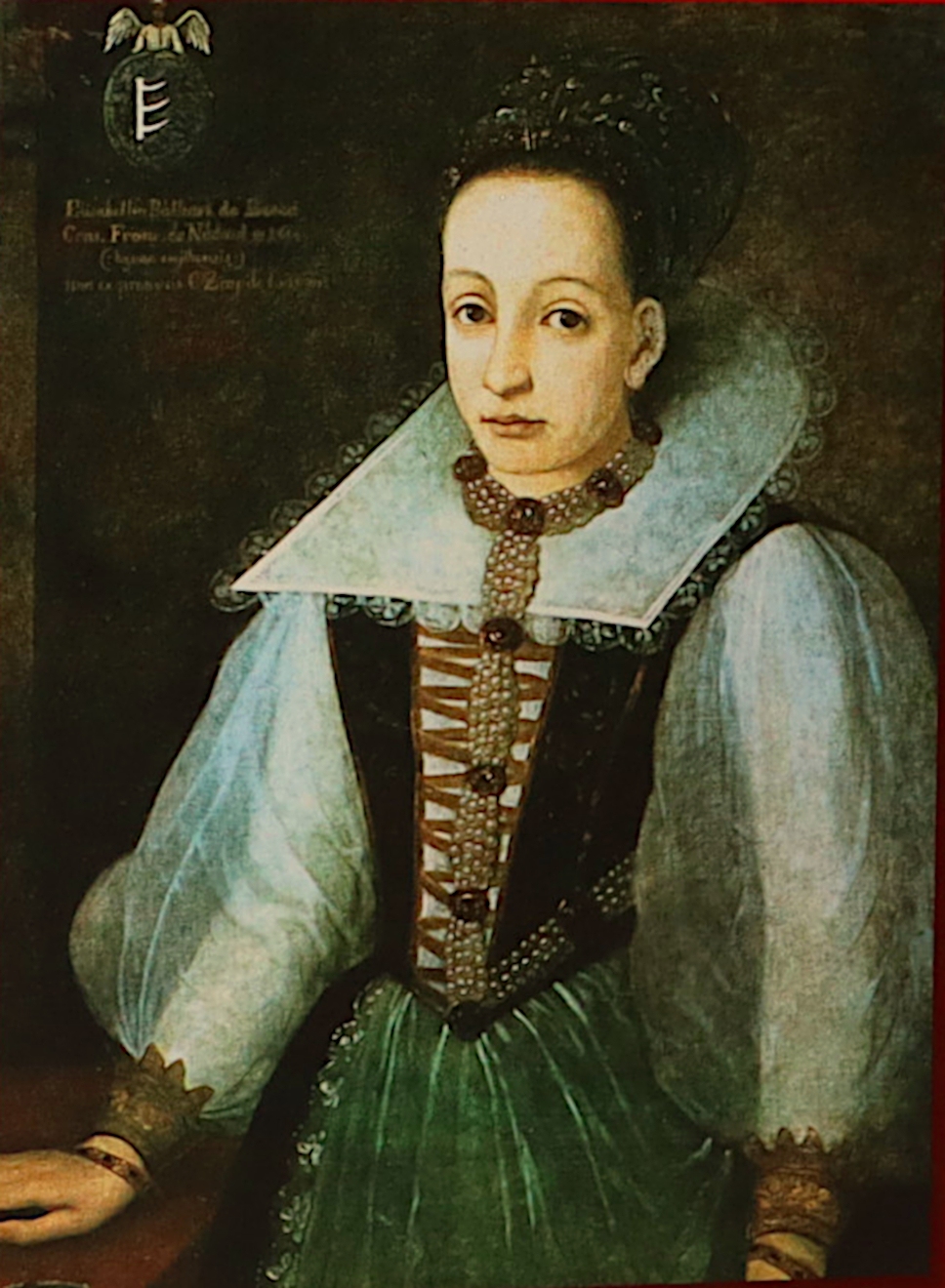
Elizabeth Báthory may have forced some of her servants to eat their own flesh

Forced self-cannibalism as a form of torture or war crime has been reported. Elizabeth Báthory allegedly forced some of her servants to eat their own flesh in the early 17th century. During the violence that followed the 1991 Haitian coup d'état, victims sometimes had to eat their own hacked-off body parts. In the 1990s, young people in Uganda were forced to eat their own ears.

=== Related practices ===
Eating one's own placenta has a small following in Western cultures, fostered by celebrities like January Jones. Human placentophagy after childbirth is touted by some as a treatment for postpartum depression and fatigue, among other health benefits, given its high protein, rich iron and nutrient content. However, scientific research is inconclusive as to whether consuming the placenta has any health benefits, exceeding that of readily acquired meats.

While the status of placentophagy as cannibalism is debated, Harriet Hall has pointed out that "placental tissue is mainly derived from the fertilized egg and carries the fetus's genome", suggesting that the placenta is a temporary organ of the fetus rather than of the mother. Therefore, even if one considers placentophagy a form of cannibalism, a mother eating her baby's placenta after giving birth would not practice self-cannibalism.

== Animals ==
The short-tailed cricket is known to eat its own wings. There is evidence of certain animals digesting their own nervous tissue when they transition to a new phase of life. The sea squirt (with a tadpole-like shape) contains a ganglion "brain" in its head, which it digests after attaching itself to a rock and becoming stationary, forming an anemone-like organism. This has been used as evidence that the purpose of brain and nervous tissue is primarily to produce movement. Self-cannibalism behaviour has been documented in North American rat snakes: one captive snake attempted to consume itself twice, dying in the second attempt. Another wild rat snake was found having swallowed about two-thirds of its body.

== References in myths, legends and stories ==
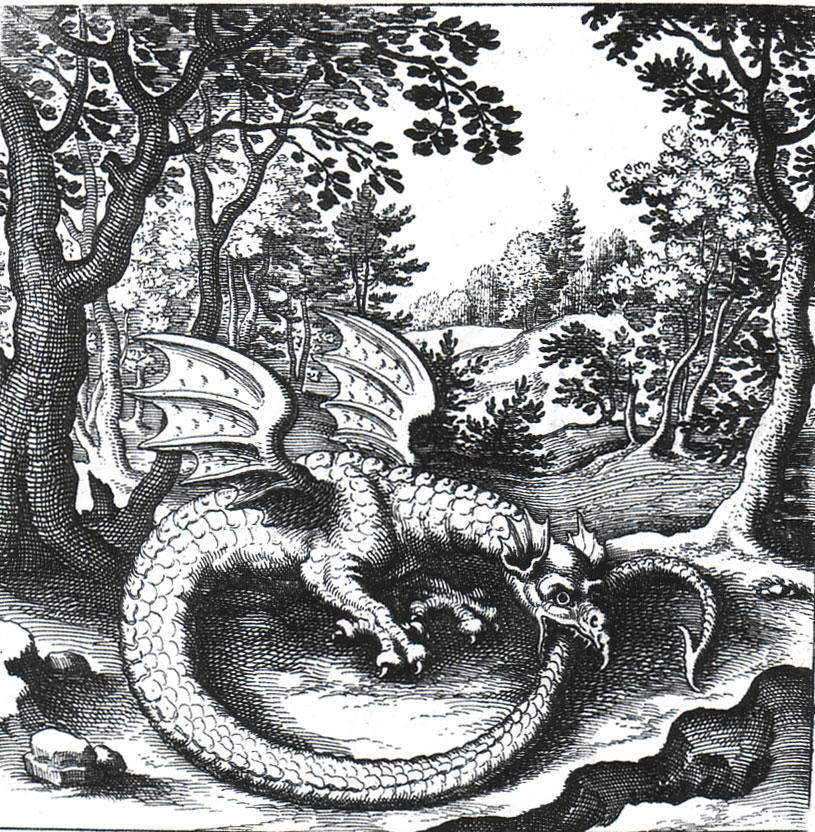
Ouroboros biting its own tail

The ancient symbol Ouroboros depicts a serpent biting its own tail.

Erysichthon from Greek mythology ate himself in insatiable hunger given to him, as a punishment, by Demeter.

In an Arthurian tale, King Agrestes of Camelot goes mad after massacring the Christian disciples of Josephus within his city, and eats his own hands.

In 1679, Philip Rohr published a study of what he called "grave eating" or "the chewing dead". The book brought together a wealth of accounts of corpses thought to have "consumed their own shrouds and winding cloths, and even their own limbs and bowels". Rohr also described particular sounds supposedly heard from the graves when a corpse either "laps like some thirsty animal" or chews, grunts, and groans. The 18th century also produced a considerable amount of literature on the subject.

In Stephen King's short story "Survivor Type", a surgeon gets washed up on an island and begins eating himself in order to survive. The story was published in 1982 in the anthology Terrors and was included in King's short story collection Skeleton Crew.

== See also ==
- List of autocannibalism incidents
- Autovampirism
- Nose picking § Consumption
- Human placentophagy
- Placentophagy
