= Autoenucleation =

Self-inflicted removal of one's own eye

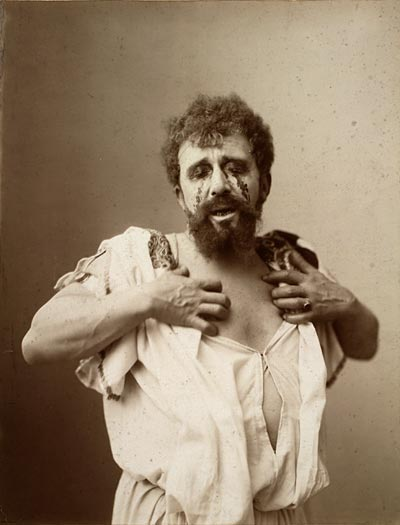
The mythical Oedipus (portrayed by Louis Bouwmeester in this 1890s photograph) gouged his eyes out.

Autoenucleation, also known as oedipism, is the self-inflicted enucleation (removal) of the eye. It is considered a form of self-mutilation and is normally caused by psychosis, paranoid delusions or drugs. Between 1968 and 2018, there were more than 50 documented cases of "complete or partial self-enucleation in English medical journals".

== History ==
A famous case of autoenucleation can be found in Greek mythology: Oedipus, according to Sophocles's tragedy Oedipus Rex, gouged his own eyes out after discovering he had married his mother.

In the 13th century, Marco Polo witnessed a pious Baghdad carpenter who enucleated his right eye for sinful thoughts of a young female customer.

The psychosexual development theory of Sigmund Freud (now widely considered non-factual) explained autoenucleation as "the result of psycho-sexual conflicts".

In the 19th century, Jews in the Pale of Settlement in eastern Europe sometimes resorted to self-mutilation, including blinding themselves in one eye, to avoid the Russian empire's onerous regime of military conscription.

On April 1, 2004, Andre Thomas removed his right eye with his bare hands whilst he was in jail awaiting trial for fatally stabbing his estranged wife and her two children. Thomas was later diagnosed with schizophrenia. On December 9, 2008, whilst on death row after being convicted of capital murder, Thomas removed his left eye and ate it. Thomas said he ingested his eye to prevent the federal government of the United States from reading his thoughts.

On February 6, 2018, a 20-year old American, Kaylee Muthart, received national attention after she gouged both her eyes out while high on methamphetamine, believing that "sacrificing her eyes [would] save the world".

In May 2019, Tanya Suárez removed her own eyes in a San Diego, California, county jail while under the influence of methamphetamine. She sued San Diego county, alleging that a sheriff's deputy watched her from outside her cell door but did nothing; video footage to that effect has reportedly been seen in court, but not released to the public. In October 2022, she settled with the county for $4.35m.
