= Mike Omer =

Israeli author

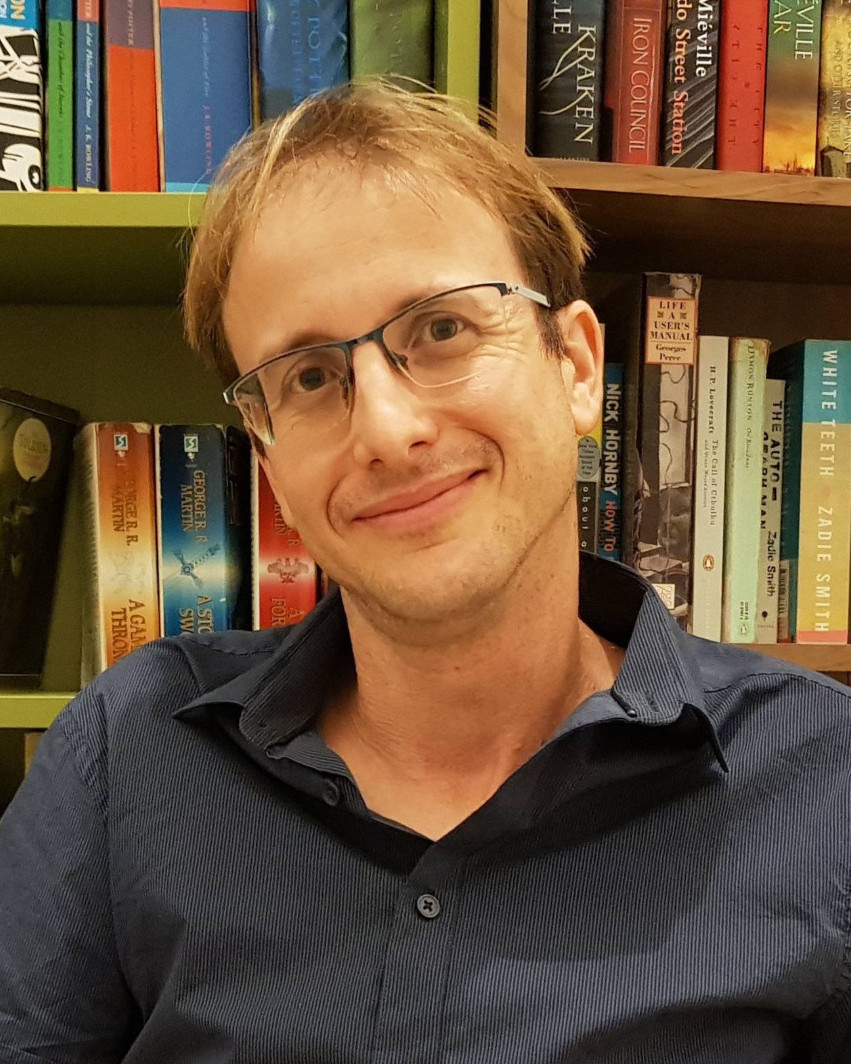
- Mike Omer, 2017
- Born: Michael Omer; June 20, 1979 (age 47); Jerusalem, Israel
- Occupation: Writer
- Children: 3
- Writing career
- Language: English
- Years active: 1995–present
- Genres: mystery; thriller; horror; Fantasy

Michael "Mike" Omer (born 20 June 1979) is an author of crime, thriller, horror and fantasy who lives in Cork, Ireland. Born in Israel, his books have been translated into more than 20 languages and have sold over 2.5 million copies. He is a New York Times bestseller, a Washington Post bestseller, and authored the second most-read Kindle book of 2018. Omer has received the LiveLib Readers' Choice Award for Detective Fiction, the Russian Detective Prize, and the Thomas & Mercer Silver Raven Award.

== Early life ==
Omer was born in Jerusalem in 1979. Both parents are psychologists, and one brother is the artist Noam Omer. At age six the family relocated to Boston for a year for his father's post-doctorate, where Omer acquired fluent English. From a young age he was a voracious reader of science fiction and fantasy.

== Career ==
=== Early works ===
At 16, inspired by Douglas Adams and Terry Pratchett, Omer wrote his first novel, The Geography of the End of the World, published by Israeli publisher Opus in 1995; he was the imprint’s youngest author.

His second novel, The Duck Attack (1999), was nominated for the Gefen Award. In the late 2000s he wrote social satire and launched the (now defunct) platform Loof Columns.

In 2011 Omer co-created the RPG Misfortune with Shahar Kober and Ziv Botzer, writing the main plot and worldbuilding over two years; Gamasutra praised its multi-thread storytelling.

=== The Narrowdale series ===
Omer next wrote an interactive YA project, Nedudey Shena (Insomnia), with supplemental short videos, in a collaboration between Kinneret Zmora-Bitan and Keter Publishing House. A companion website hosted the protagonist’s vlog, noted by Haaretz. The English edition, Sleepless, appeared in 2015. Sequels included Moth to a Flame and The Buzzing.

=== Glenmore Park ===
After six fantasy books, Omer shifted to contemporary realism/crime, adopting the pen name “Mike Omer”. He created the Massachusetts-set city of Glenmore Park for a trilogy beginning with Spider’s Web (2016), followed by Deadly Web and Web of Fear.

=== Zoe Bentley trilogy ===
A side character from Spider’s Web, FBI profiler Zoe Bentley, headlined Omer’s Thomas & Mercer–published thrillers: A Killer's Mind (2018), In the Darkness (2019), and Thicker Than Blood (2020). A Killer’s Mind reached major bestseller lists.

=== Abby Mullen trilogy ===
In March 2021 Omer published A Deadly Influence, praised by Kirkus as “an expert ticking-clock suspenser”. Publishers Weekly called the debut “smart”. Sequels followed: Damaged Intentions (March 2022) and A Burning Obsession (November 2023).

== Books ==
=== As Michael Omer ===
- Omer, Michael (1995). The Geography of the End of the World (in Hebrew). Danacode 348331. Opus.
- Omer, Michael (1999). The Duck Attack (in Hebrew). Danacode 378-204-87. Yaron Golan.
- Omer, Michael (2014). Sleepless (in Hebrew). Kinneret Zmora Bitan Dvir Keter. ISBN 9789655528442.
- Omer, Michael (2015). Sleepless. CreateSpace. ISBN 9781507541029.
- Omer, Michael (2015). Moth to a Flame. CreateSpace. ISBN 9781514657539.

=== As Mike Omer ===
- Omer, Mike (2016). Spider's Web (Glenmore Park Book 1). CreateSpace. ISBN 978-1533006837.
- Omer, Mike (2016). Deadly Web (Glenmore Park Book 2). CreateSpace. ISBN 978-1519612564.
- Omer, Mike (2016). Web of Fear (Glenmore Park Book 3). CreateSpace. ISBN 978-1539360971.
- Omer, Mike (2018). A Killer's Mind (Zoe Bentley Mystery Book 1). Thomas & Mercer. ISBN 978-1503900745.
- Omer, Mike (2019). In the Darkness (Zoe Bentley Mystery Book 2). Thomas & Mercer. ISBN 978-1542040594.
- Omer, Mike (2020). Thicker Than Blood (Zoe Bentley Mystery Book 3). Thomas & Mercer. ISBN 978-1542042444.
- Omer, Mike (2021). A Deadly Influence (Abby Mullen Thrillers Book 1). Thomas & Mercer. ISBN 978-1542022873.
- Omer, Mike (2022). Damaged Intentions (Abby Mullen Thrillers Book 2). Thomas & Mercer. ISBN 9781542032520.
- Omer, Mike (2022). A Burning Obsession (Abby Mullen Thrillers Book 3). Thomas & Mercer. ISBN 9781542034326.
- Omer, Mike (2023). Please Tell Me. Thomas & Mercer. ISBN 9781662509377.
- Omer, Mike (2024). Behind You. Thomas & Mercer. ISBN 9781662509384.

== Awards ==
- LiveLib Readers' Choice Award for Detective Fiction, 2020 (A Killer's Mind), 2023 (Damaged Intentions)
- The Russian Detective Prize, 2020 (A Killer's Mind)

== Film adaptations ==
In February, 2024, a TV series based on the novel "A Killer's Mind" (Russian: "Внутри убийцы") was released in the VOD streaming service Kinopoisk, which acquired the rights to the film adaptation in 2021. The main action of the series was transferred from Chicago to St. Petersburg. The main roles were played by Anastasia Yevgrafova and Tikhon Zhiznevsky.
