= Richard Noll =

American clinical psychologist and historian of medicine

Richard Noll (born 1959 in Detroit, Michigan) is an American clinical psychologist and historian of medicine. He has published on the history of psychiatry, including two critical volumes on the life and work of Carl Gustav Jung, books and articles on the history of dementia praecox and schizophrenia, and in anthropology on shamanism. His books and articles have been translated into fifteen foreign languages and he has delivered invited presentations in nineteen countries on six continents.

== Early life and education ==
Noll grew up in the Belton-Mark Twain Park neighborhood in southwest Detroit. In 1971 he relocated to Phoenix, Arizona, where he attended Brophy College Preparatory, a Jesuit institution. From 1977 to 1979, he lived in Tucson, Arizona and studied political science at the University of Arizona. In the fall of 1978, he spent a National Collegiate Honors Council semester at the United Nations in New York, returning to complete his B.A. in political science in May 1979. In 1992, he received his Ph.D. in clinical psychology from the New School for Social Research. His dissertation research was an experimental study of cognitive style differences between paranoid and nonparanoid schizophrenia. The chair of his dissertation committee was Nikki Erlenmeyer-Kimling of the New York State Psychiatric Institute.

== Career ==
From 1979 to 1984, Noll was employed in the resettlement of Vietnamese, Laotian, Cambodian and Hmong refugees for both Church World Service and the International Rescue Committee in New York City. From 1985 to 1988, Noll was a staff psychologist on various wards at Ancora Psychiatric Hospital in Hammonton, New Jersey.

In 1981 he was a summer research student at the Foundation for Research on the Nature of Man, the Institute of Parapsychology, in Durham, North Carolina. He was a research assistant for an unpublished study on the psychokinetic resuscitation of anesthetized mice. In a "Reply" to comments to a 1985 article on shamanism, Noll revealed he had been a subject in the noted Ganzfeld parapsychology experiments conducted by Charles Honorton at the Psychophysiological Research Laboratory in Princeton, N.J., probably in 1982. In November 1978 Noll experienced a purported anomalous "phantasmogenetic centre" event (a term coined by psychical researcher Frederick W.H. Myers) and donated a binder of documents relating to it to the Archives of the Impossible at Rice University in Houston in 2018 just prior to its formal opening.

Before assuming a position as a professor of psychology at DeSales University in Center Valley, Pennsylvania in August 2000, he taught and conducted research at Harvard University for four years as a postdoctoral fellow and as Lecturer on the History of Science. During the 1995–1996 academic year, he was a visiting scholar at the Massachusetts Institute of Technology and a resident fellow at the Dibner Institute for the History of Science and Technology.

On December 25, 2017, Noll was awarded a Japan Society for the Promotion of Science Invitational Fellowship for Research in Japan. As a JSPS fellow, in June 2018 he delivered invited lectures on shamanism at the University of Shiga Prefecture in Hikone, the National Museum of Ethnology (MINPAKU) in Osaka, and at the Research Institute of Islands and Sustainability at the University of the Ryukyus in Naha, Okinawa. Together with anthropologist Ippei Shimamura, he also conducted fieldwork among the indigenous female yuta (mediums/shamans in Ryukyuan religion) on Okinawa in the Ryukyu Islands and the ascetic monastic yamabushi / shugenja community on Mount Omine in Nara Prefecture who practice the form of Esoteric Buddhism known as Shugendo. While at the Ominesan-ji temple they observed a goma fire ritual involving the ritual invocation of Fudō Myōō 不動明王.

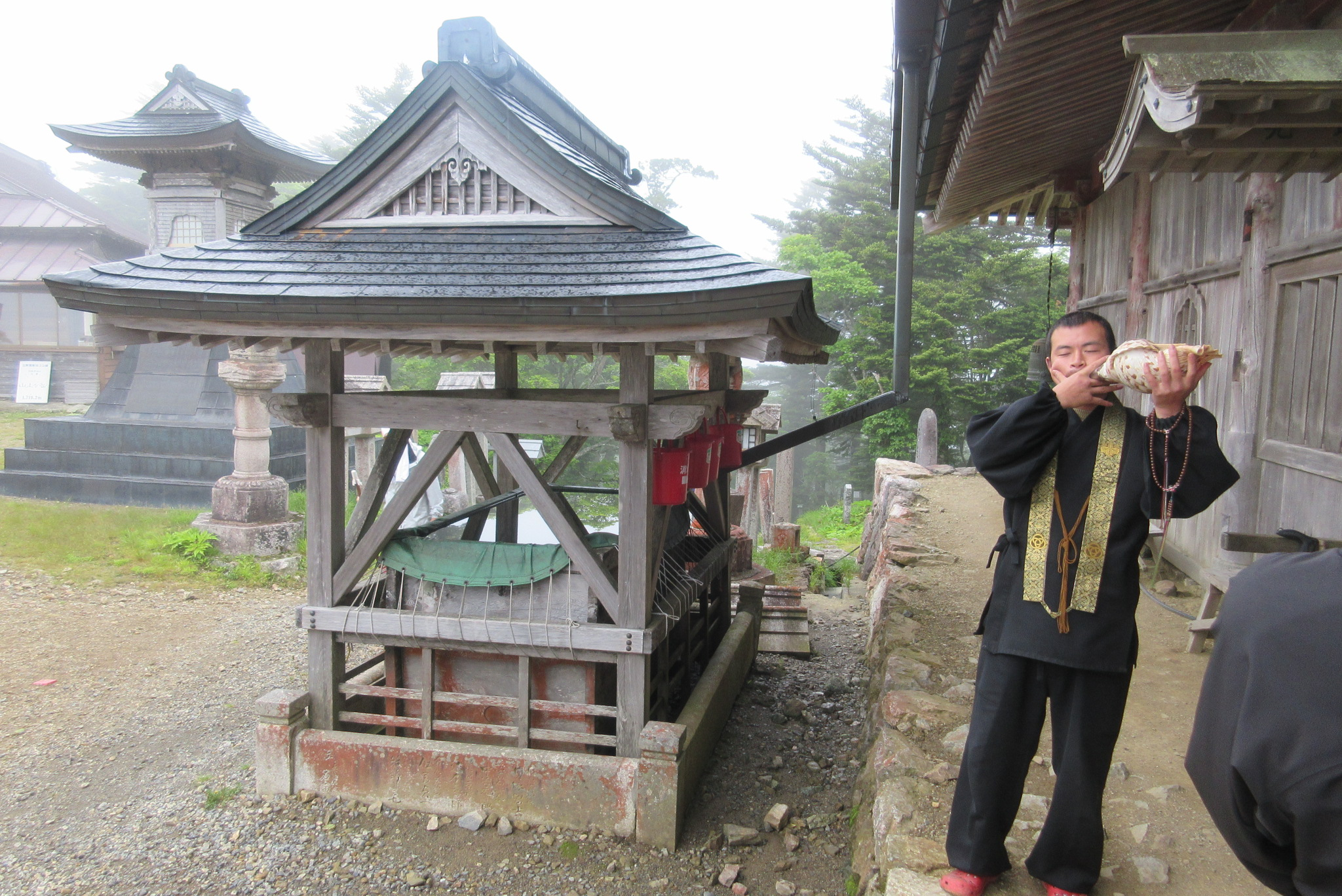
Shugenja yamabushi monk, Ominesan-ji Temple, Mt. Omine, Nara, Japan, 20 June 2018

In June 2018, Noll was appointed honorary visiting professor at the University of Shiga Prefecture in Hikone, Japan.

=== Carl Gustav Jung scholarship ===
In February 1995 Noll, received an award for best professional/scholarly book in psychology published in 1994 from the Association of American Publishers for his book, The Jung Cult: Origins of a Charismatic Movement. The resulting controversy over the book made front-page headlines worldwide, including a front-page report in the 3 June 1995 issue of The New York Times. Princeton University Press submitted The Jung Cult to the Pulitzer Prize competition that year, without success.

The background to the controversy over Noll's research on Jung can be found in the "Preface of the New Edition" of The Jung Cult published in paperback by Free Press Paperbacks in 1997 and in an article he wrote for a Random House, Inc., promotional publication, At Random, in that same year. An August 2016 interview with Noll added new details. At the urging of the Jung family and estate, Princeton University Press cancelled the publication of a second book edited by Noll which had already made it into final page proofs form, Mysteria: Jung and the Ancient Mysteries: Selections from the Writings of C.G. Jung (ISBN 0-691-03647-0). A pdf of the page proofs containing only Noll's contributions to the book is available online. A summary of his controversial conclusions was outlined in a short piece in The Times Higher Education Supplement on 22 November 1996.

Noll also summarized his views in a 7 October 1997 interview by Terry Gross on NPR's "Fresh Air." The full broadcast is available on the NPR website.

In his intellectual history of the 20th century, historian Peter Watson noted that "[Noll's] books provoked a controversy no less bitter than the one over Freud . . . ." Frederick Crews lauded The Jung Cult as "an important study."

Noll was praised for his "groundbreaking analyses" of Jung's life and work by cultural historian Wouter Hanegraaff in his comprehensive 1996 study of New Age religion. In a recent work, noting the absence of any reference to Noll's scholarship on Jung in the publications of prominent Jung historians in the decade after the backlash to Noll ended after 2005, Hanegraaff remarked, "Unfortunately, Noll's historical scholarship is simply discarded along with the 'cult' thesis . . . ." This absence has also been noted by other critics of Noll's work.

According to an article by Sara Corbett, "The Holy Grail of the Unconscious," published in The New York Times Magazine on Sunday, 20 September 2009, the Jung family's fear of "the specter of Richard Noll" was cited as a contributing factor in the decision to allow Jung's "Red Book" to be edited and published by W.W. Norton in October 2009.

The most significant academic criticism of Noll's scholarship and conclusions came from the historian of psychology Sonu Shamdasani. In his 1998 book Cult Fictions, Shamdasani disputed the attribution and interpretation of a central item of documentary evidence adduced by Noll, and also challenged the claim that Jung established a 'cult'. However, documents deposited by Noll in 2014 in the Cummings Center for the History of Psychology in Akron, Ohio, reveal that prior to the publication of Noll's book in September 1994 Shamdasani and John Kerr held nearly identical views to Noll's concerning the cult hypothesis, the importance of Jung's deification experiences, and the interpretation of the contested document as authored by Jung. Shamdasani's letter to Noll of 29 July 1992 and Princeton University Press editor Eric Rohmann's fax to Shamdasani dated 11 March 1994 in the Cummings archives document this. Both Shamdasani and Kerr pressured Noll and the editors of Princeton University Press to remove the document prior to the publication of the book. "We cannot ask Richard to remove this document simply because you have also read it and interpreted it as being what Richard presents it as, i.e., the inaugural address at the Zurich Psychological Club," wrote Rohmann to Shamdasani. Having lost this battle, Shamdasani later argued that the document was actually authored by Jung's associate Maria Molzer. However, Noll himself had previously raised this as a possible alternative interpretation.

In a letter to Noll from Shamdasani dated 29 July 1992, which resides in the collections of the Cummings Center for the History of Psychology in Akron, Ohio, Shamdasani wrote: " . . . in focusing on the deification experience and the forming of a cult, you are more right than you realise." This quote was referenced without full citation in a book by historian of religion Carrie B. Dohe.

In a book review published on 17 January 2020 in the Los Angeles Review of Books classicist Gregory Shaw credited Noll for being the first to document in 1994 that Jung's concept of "individuation" was actually a recipe for "deification."

Further critics emerged among Jung's family, Jungian analysts and others who were self-identified Jungians. Franz Jung, the son of C.G. Jung, reportedly told a German journalist that Noll's work was "Mist" (bullshit). In 1999 Anthony Stevens (Jungian analyst) added an "Afterword" to the second edition of his book, On Jung, entitled "Jung's Adversary: Richard Noll." Using the term "adversary" as an allusion to the Biblical "Satan," Stevens wrote that it was necessary to counter "the gravest of Richard Noll's charges" because, "I believe . . . he has been so effective in promoting his ideas that there is a danger that they will enter public consciousness as received wisdom" and tarnish "Jung's memory" and "the whole tradition of psychotherapy practiced in his name."

In a video of a 2014 classroom lecture on Jung posted on YouTube, University of Toronto professor and clinical psychologist Jordan Peterson characterized Noll as "crooked." He also accused Noll of deliberately using "Nazi imagery" on the cover of his books to gain "economic utility,".

In a 1998 interview Jungian analyst and "archetypal psychologist" James Hillman was asked by interviewer Cliff Bostock what he thought of Noll's books on Jung. "I hate them," Hillman replied. "I think he's a shit."

=== Criticism of American Psychiatry during the "Satanic Ritual Abuse" moral panic of the 1980s and 1990s ===
He was an early public critic of the American psychiatric profession's complicity in the moral panic of the late 1980s and early 1990s concerning Satanic ritual abuse. "Except for the work of very few mental-health professionals, such as psychologist Richard Noll and psychiatrists George K. Ganaway and Frank W. Putnam, what little psychiatric writing has emerged on survivors and their therapy has uncritically embraced the literal truth of survivors' claims."

At the invitation of psychiatrist and researcher Frank Putnam, then the Chief of the Dissociative Disorders Unit at the National Institute of Mental Health, Noll was one of four members on a plenary session panel that opened the 7th International Conference on Multiple Personality/Dissociative States in Chicago on 9 November 1990. In a ballroom filled with television cameras and more than 700 conference participants (including feminist intellectual Gloria Steinem, who was a firm believer in the veracity of "recovered memories" of satanic ritual abuse) the members of the panel presented, for the first time in a public professional forum, a skeptical viewpoint concerning SRA reports. The panel cast doubt on the corroborating evidence for the thousands of claims from patients in treatment that they were recovering memories of childhood abuse at the hands of persons (often family members) who were members of satanic cults. Such satanic cults were claimed to be intergenerational in families and had been abusing and ritually sacrificing children in secret for almost 2000 years.

When American psychiatrists published purported historical evidence supporting these beliefs in the peer-reviewed journal Dissociation in March 1989, In a following issue (December 1989) Noll dismissed their arguments, claiming that SRA beliefs were "a modern version of (a) paranoid mass delusion -- and one in which all too many clinicians and law enforcement officials also share" was the first unambiguous skepticism of the moral panic to be published in a medical journal. It may have also been the first publication to explicitly link claims of recovered memory of satanic ritual abuse to claims of recovered memories of UFO abductions, the other cultural firestorm that was raging in American culture in the late 1980s. Noll continued his public skepticism elsewhere. Noll's 1990 panel presentation was an elaboration of this earlier published critique. Other members of the 1990 conference panel were anthropologist Sherrill Mulhern and psychiatrist George Ganaway.

Noll's participation on the panel was viewed by SRA believers as part of a deliberate disinformation campaign by Frank Putnam, who was skeptical of the reality of satanic cults. This set Putnam apart from other prominent American psychiatrists who were less critical, such as conference organizer Bennett G. Braun, a member of the Dissociative Disorders work group for the American Psychiatric Association's diagnostic manual, DSM-III-R (1987). According to an account based on interviews, "conference attendees characterized (Noll) as a professional expendable who had no idea he was being used. Through him, they contended, Putnam could cast doubt on the contentious issue of linking MPD to ritual abuse." However, Noll's skeptical presentation did have an effect: "Mulhern and Noll cut a line through the therapeutic community. A minority joined them in refusing to believe sacrificial murder was going on; the majority still believed their patients' accounts."

Psychiatric Times published Noll's memoir of the 1990 conference online on 6 December 2013. However, after a week online the article was removed by the editors without explanation. The backstory to this controversial editorial decision was explored in blog posts by the author Gary Greenberg and psychiatrist and psychoanalyst John "Mickey" Nardo. The PDF of the published article is available on the web.

Prompted by Noll's article, psychiatrist Allen Frances, who was editor-in-chief of DSM-IV (1994) and who led the DSM-IV Task Force during the height of the satanic ritual abuse moral panic, formally apologized for his public silence during that era and explained his reasons for keeping MPD (as Dissociative Identity Disorder) in DSM-IV despite his belief it was a purely iatrogenic idiom of distress.

On 19 March 2014 the Psychiatric Times reposted Noll's retracted article under a different title and with text deletions selected by the editors. Along with the article was commentaries by three American psychiatrists who were discussed in the article as well a response from Noll. Allen Frances added additional comments reproducing his blog posts from other websites.

In April 2014 Douglas Misicko (alias Doug Mesner, alias Lucien Greaves), co-founder of the international nontheistic religion and political activist organization The Satanic Temple, published a lengthy article on his website Dysgenics in support of Noll's stance against mental health professionals who promote satanic cult conspiracies and the discredited "recovered memory" psychotherapy. Mesner's initial formation of The Satanic Temple on a Facebook page in 2013 was inspired by his longstanding public opposition to SRA proponents and the fact they continued to exist long after scientific and legal challenges had discredited their claims. Along with religion scholars Massimo Introvigne and Joseph Laycock, on 14 July 2018 Noll participated in a panel discussion entitled "Scholars Confront The Satanic Temple" at the Salem Art Gallery in Salem, Massachusetts, and publicly affirmed his strong support for the Grey Faction and The Protect Children Project initiatives of TST.

The controversy drew to a close in August 2014 with two letters to the editors of Psychiatric Times in response to an article by psychologist and attorney Christopher Barden who sharply criticized Noll for failing to address the "repressed/recovered memory" controversy and the fact that legal challenges in the courts effectively ended the ability of mental health professionals to perpetuate the moral panic.

In 2017 science writer Mark Pendergrast, alarmed by the persistence of "the myth of repressed memory" and the resurgence of "recovered memory therapy" and satanic ritual abuse claims, published two books that opened with the following quote from Noll's Psychiatric Times article of 2014: "As our medical schools and graduate programs fill with students who were born after 1989, we meet young mental health professionals-in-training who have no knowledge or living memory of the Satanic ritual abuse (SRA) moral panic of the 1980s and early 1990s. But perhaps they should. Cautionary tales may prevent the recurrence of pyrogenic cultural fantasies and the devastating clinical mistakes they inspire."

The New York Times quoted Noll in September 2022 in an article on the forgotten lessons of the recovered memory movement in which he charged clinicians and professional medical and psychological organizations with "feigned forgetfulness" for their refusal to address the excesses of that movement.

In 2022 Noll wrote a more detailed memoir entitled "Satanists, Aliens and Me" in which he provided further reflections on the convergence of SRA claims and claims of "recovered memories" of UFO abductions during the 1980s and 1990s.

=== Anthropological fieldwork ===
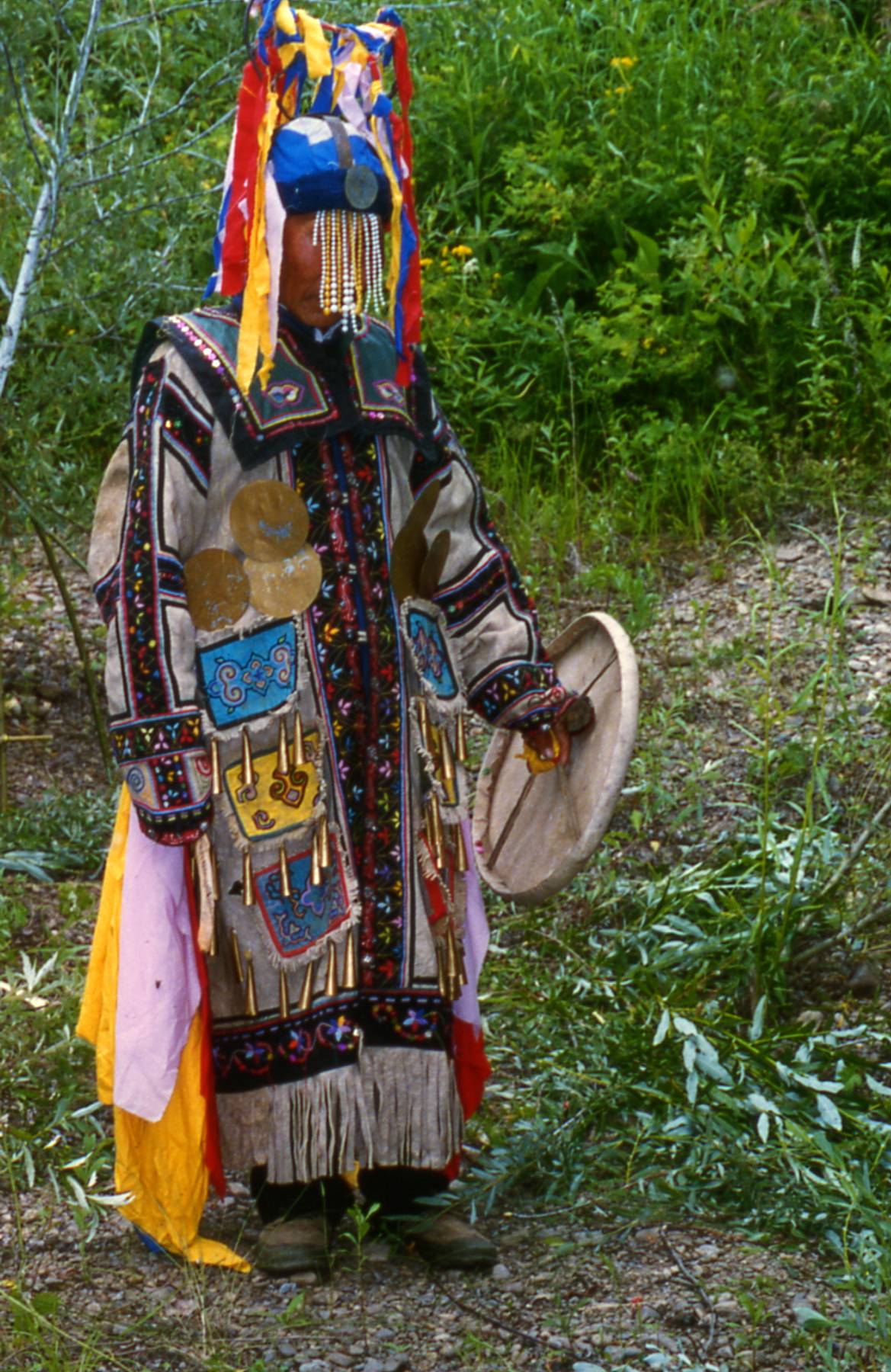
Chuonnasuan, the last shaman of the Oroqen.

In 1994 Richard Noll and his colleague from Ohio State University, anthropologist Kun SHI, explored Manchuria (just south of the Amur river, the natural border with Russian Siberia) and Inner Mongolia and interviewed the last living Tungus Siberian shamans who had openly practiced prior to being forced to abandon their nomadic life and spirits after the founding of the People's Republic of China in 1949. All visual media, fieldwork notes and other supporting correspondence and documents from this project became part of the permanent collection of the Smithsonian Institution's Human Studies Film Archives in October 2014.

The story of the life, initiatory illnesses, and shamanic training of the last living shaman of the Oroqen people, Chuonnasuan (1927–2000), was published in 2004 in the Journal of Korean Religions and is also available online. Noll's photograph of Chuonnasuan appears as the fronticepiece in Le Chamanisme de Sibérie et d’Asie centrale (Paris: Découvertes Gallimard [vol. 579], 2011) by anthropologists Charles Stépanoff (l'École pratique des hautes études, Paris) and Thierry Zarcone (also EPHE [Sorbonne], Paris).

A second published report of this fieldwork concerning the life and training of the Solon Ewenki shamaness Dula'r (Ao Yun Hua) (born 1920) appeared in the journal Shaman in 2007 (15: 167–174). The Wenner-Gren Foundation supported the fieldwork that produced these reports. The rationale for the research was provided in a 1985 article in Current Anthropology which examined the ethnographic literature on shamanism from the perspective of cognitive science. Tanya Luhrmann, the Watkins University Professor of Anthropology at Stanford University, lauded Noll's 1985 article as a novel turning point in the anthropological study of religion.

In June 2017 Noll and Canadian psychologist Leonard George of Capilano University conducted fieldwork in Mongolia and observed the practices of shamans and Buddhist lamas who follow the Tibetan (Vajrayana) tradition and practice visualization meditations. Their fieldwork was conducted in both the Ulaanbaatar area and near Sainshand in the southeastern Gobi Desert in Dornogovi Province. Both Noll and George delivered presentations to the Institute of Philosophy of the Mongolian Academy of Sciences in Ulaanbaatar at the invitation of Chuluunbaatar Gelegpil, Mongolia's Minister of Education and Culture.

Video clips by Noll of the multi-hour summer solstice "fire ritual" for the Ulaan Tergel (literally "Red Disk") performed by Mongol shamans which was held out on the steppes 15 km from Ulaanbaatar on 21 June 2017 can be found on YouTube Noll and George were invited to this event by Jargalsaikhan, the head of the Mongolian Corporate Union of Shamans. According to the Austrian Mongolist Walther Heissig (1913–2005), this same "renewal of life" ritual is recorded in the earliest historical reports concerning the Mongols from the 11th and 12th centuries and was performed by Genghis Khan (1162-1227): "A great festival of religious character was the 'Day of the Red Disk,' the summer solstice on the sixteenth day of the first month of summer."

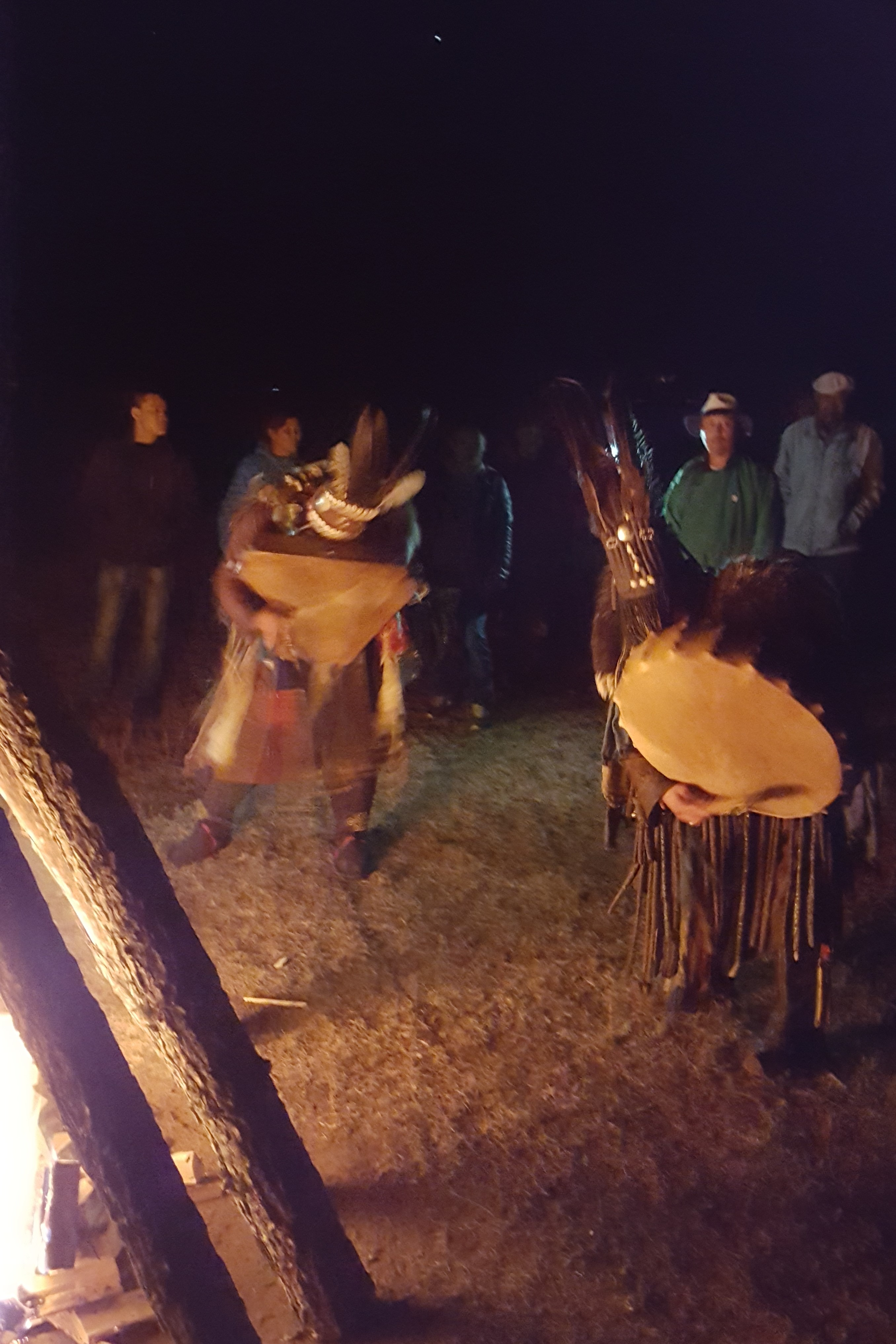
Mongol shamans in a "fire ritual" to celebrate the summer solstice (Ulaan Tergel) on the night of 21 June 2017

Noll was introduced to both the scholarly study and techniques of shamanism in the fall of 1980 by the anthropologist Michael Harner, then a professor at the New School for Social Research in New York City. "Noll has trained with me firsthand in the classic shamanic methods," wrote Harner.

=== Dementia praecox and schizophrenia scholarship ===
Noll's most recent book, American Madness: The Rise and Fall of Dementia Praecox, was published by Harvard University Press in October 2011. A brief interview with Noll appears on the Harvard University Press Blog (30 January 2012).

In April 2012 it was announced that American Madness: The Rise and Fall of Dementia Praecox was the winner of the 2012 Cheiron Book Prize from Cheiron, International Society for the History of the Behavioral and Social Sciences.

On September 13, 2012, American Madness: The Rise and Fall of Dementia Praecox won a 2012 BMA Medical Book Award - Highly Commended in Psychiatry from the British Medical Association.

In March 2013, Scientific American Mind incorporated findings from American Madness in its print and online "timeline" on the history of schizophrenia.

A brief favorable review of the book, along with a photo of its cover, appeared in the 27 October 2011 issue of Nature.

"Tales of personal drama enliven Noll's story in a way that few would imagine possible for a historical account of nosology," said a reviewer in the American Journal of Psychiatry. According to sociologist Andrew Scull in the Journal of American History, "Richard Noll's American Madness is an important book that deserves a wide readership among those interested in understanding the development of American psychiatry between 1896 and the 1930s."

In a September 2012 review in Isis historian John C. Burnham noted, "It is clearly written and is based on a remarkably thorough literature search and reading of primary sources. . . . Noll's book will become a useful narrative for much of the modern history of psychiatry in the United States." He further added, "the research and thinking that went into this book make it refreshing and valuable."

=== Collaborative biomarkers research on schizophrenia research ===
Since 2011, Noll has occasionally collaborated with an interdisciplinary group of schizophrenia researchers at the Bahn Laboratory at the University of Cambridge (UK) and the Erasmus Medical Center in Rotterdam (the Netherlands). Their research program seeks to identify valid biomarkers that might serve as molecular endophenotypes of schizophrenia and become the basis of a valid biological diagnostic test for psychosis and its developmental risk factors.

Since April 2019, Noll has been an affiliate member of the Scientific Coalition for UAP Studies (SCU). He is currently researching the history of claims of biological/medical/psychiatric sequelae of CEII-physiological cases.

== Bibliography (selected publications) ==
- 1983 Shamanism and schizophrenia: A state-specific approach to the "schizophrenia metaphor" of shamanic states. American Ethnologist 10: 443–459.
- 1985 Mental imagery cultivation as a cultural phenomenon: The role of visions in shamanism. Current Anthropology 26:443-461 (with commentary).
- 1989 What has really been learned about shamanism? Journal of Psychoactive Drugs 21: 47–50.
- 1990 Bizarre Diseases of the Mind; Real-Life Cases of Rare Mental Illnesses, Vampirism, Possession, Split Personalities, and More(New York: Berkeley), ISBN 0-425-12172-0
- 1992 Vampires, Werewolves and Demons: Twentieth Century Reports in the Psychiatric Literature(New York: Brunner/Mazel), ISBN 0-87630-632-6
- 1994 The Jung Cult: Origins of a Charismatic Movement (Princeton: Princeton University Press), ISBN 0-684-83423-5
- 1997 The Aryan Christ: The Secret Life of Carl Jung (New York: Random House), ISBN 0-679-44945-0 full text: The Aryan Christ: The secret life of Carl Jung
- 1997 The Jung Cult: Origins of a Charismatic Movement (paperback) (New York: Free Press), ISBN 0-684-83423-5
- 1997 "A Christ Named Carl Jung," At Random (ISSN 1062-0036), Volume 6, Number 3, 56–59.
- 1999 Jung the Leontocephalus [1992], in Paul Bishop (ed.), Jung in Contexts: A Reader (Routledge), RICHARD NOLL | PhD | DeSales University, Pennsylvania | Department of Social Sciences
- 1999 Styles of psychiatric practice, 1906-1925: Clinical evaluations of the same patient by James Jackson Putnam, Adolf Meyer, August Hoch, Emil Kraepelin and Smith Ely Jelliffe. History of Psychiatry 10: 145–189.
- 2004 Historical review: Autointoxication and focal infection theories of dementia praecox. World Journal of Biological Psychiatry 5:66-72.
- 2004 Dementia Praecox Studies (letter to the editor and historical note). Schizophrenia Research 68: 103–104.
- 2006 The blood of the insane. History of Psychiatry 17: 395–418.
- 2006 Haeckel, Ernst Heinrich. In Encyclopedia of Modern Europe: Europe 1789 to 1914--Encyclopedia of the Age of Industry and Empire, Volume 2, edited by John Merriman and Jay Winter (New York: Thomas Gale).
- 2007 (with Kun Shi) A Solon Ewenki shaman and her Abagaldai shaman mask. Shaman: Journal of the International Society for Shamanistic Research (Budapest, Hungary) 15: 37–44.
- 2007 The Encyclopedia of Schizophrenia and Other Psychotic Disorders, third edition (New York: Facts-on-File), ISBN 0-8160-6405-9
- 2009 (with Kun Shi) The last shaman of the Oroqen people of Northeast China. Shaman: Journal of the International Society for Shamanistic Research (Budapest, Hungary) 17 (1 and 2): 117–140.
- 2011 Sabine Bahn, Richard Noll, Anthony Barnes, Emmanuel Schwarz, Paul C. Guest. Challenges of introducing new biomarker products for neuropsychiatric disorders into the market. International Review of Neurobiology, 101:299-327.
- 2011 American Madness: The Rise and Fall of Dementia Praecox (Cambridge: Harvard University Press, 2011) ISBN 978-0-674-04739-6
- 2012 Whole body madness. Psychiatric Times (print), 29(12):13-14. Whole Body Madness
- 2013 The bed makes gestures. Psychiatric Times (print), 30 (3): 25. The Bed Makes Gestures
- 2013 Suffering and sadness are not diseases. Harvard University Press Blog (28 May 2013) Suffering and Sadness Are Not Diseases
- 2013 (Spring) Tribal epistemologies. Bio/Politics Biopolitics -
- 2013 When psychiatry battled the devil. "When Psychiatry Battled the Devil," Psychiatric Times (6 December 2013) and story of its retraction: https://retractionwatch.com/2014/02/13/psychiatric-times-retracts-essay-on-satanic-ritual-abuse/
- 2014 NJM van Beveren, E Schwartz, Richard Noll, PC Guest, C Meijer, L de Haan and Sabina Bahn. Evidence for disturbed insulin and growth hormone signaling as potential risk factors in the development of schizophrenia. Translational Psychiatry, 4, e430; doi:10.1038/tp.2014.52
- 2016 (with Kenneth S. Kendler) Images in Psychiatry: Edward Cowles (1837-1919). American Journal of Psychiatry 2016 (Oct.), 173 (10): 967–968.
- 2017 Psychosis. In Greg Eghigian (ed.), The Routledge History of Madness and Mental Health(London and New York: Routledge, 2017), 331–349.
- 2017 (with Colin G. DeYoung and Kenneth S. Kendler) Images in Psychiatry: Thomas Verner Moore. American Journal of Psychiatry 2017 (Aug), 174 (8): 729–730.
- 2018 Feeling and Smelling Psychosis: American Alienism, Psychiatry, Prodromes and the Limits of "Category Work." History of the Human Sciences 2018 (April), 31 (2): 22–41.
