= Agrestes =

Possibly fictional pagan king of Camelot

Agrestes was, according to the 13th-century Arthurian Vulgate Cycle, a pagan king of Camelot in the time of Joseph of Arimathea. Though the Lancelot section of the cycle has him converted by Joseph himself, the Estoire del Saint Graal section, written after the Vulgate Lancelot as a prequel, states that Joseph's son Josephus converted him. He persecuted those of his people who converted to Christianity under Josephus' influence:

When Josephus, the son of Joseph of Arimathea, began converting Agrestes’ people to Christianity, the king pretended to go along. As soon as Josephus had left, however, Agrestes forced his people back to their heathen religion and killed the disciples that Josephus had left in the city. Following this massacre, Agrestes went mad, began to eat his hands, slaughtered his family, and finally committed suicide by diving into a fire. After his death, Josephus returned and converted Camelot to Christianity for good.

== Sources ==
- Arthurian Myth and Legend: an A-Z of people and places. Blandford. 1995. ISBN 0-7137-2561-3.
