= University of Florida Obsessive–Compulsive Disorder Program =

Treatment and research clinic at the University of Florida

- Company type: Outpatient Clinic
- Headquarters: Gainesville, Florida, United States
- Area served: International
- Key people: (Directors); Gary R. Geffken, Joseph P.H. McNamara, Cindi G. Flores
- Services: Exposure and response prevention, cognitive behavioral therapy, medication management
- Website: ufhealth.org/medical-psychology-shands-uf

The University of Florida Obsessive–Compulsive Disorder Program (UF OCD) is a treatment and research clinic in the Department of Psychiatry at the University of Florida. The clinic is located in Gainesville, Florida.

== History of the clinic ==
Created by Wayne Goodman and Gary Roy Geffken, the UF OCD program focuses on training and treatment of refractory obsessive–compulsive disorder. The program originated as a stand-alone clinic within the Department of Psychiatry at the University of Florida and has expanded to a clinic integrated with child and adolescent psychiatry and the now-defunct University of Florida Eating Disorder Recovery Center. In addition, UF OCD program staff collaborate with the Florida Recovery Center at the University of Florida.

The UF OCD Program uses cognitive behavioral therapy with exposure and response prevention (CBT-E/RP), an empirically validated treatment for OCD and other anxiety disorders. The clinic treats both children and adults with OCD and has a success rate higher than the national average.

== Research ==
In addition to clinical services, the clinic serves as a functioning research facility. The clinic has been used as a site for the validation of the Children's Yale-Brown Obsessive–Compulsive Scale as well as a treatment site for several federally funded studies, such as a recent R01 federally funded from the National Institute of Mental Health to study the pharmaceutical and behavioral treatment for pediatric OCD. This study has yielded several important studies in the past year, such as the clinical implications of co-morbid depression, with several more currently in preparation.

Additionally, the program has been a part of numerous studies examining family factors that impact OCD treatment outcome, the importance of the relationship between therapist and patient during OCD treatment, and other novel psychopharmacological agents that may improve outcome.

== Training ==
The UF OCD Program is one of the few training programs in the United States recognized by the International OCD Foundation. The program trains graduate, intern, and resident level trainees in the implementation and treatment design of CBT-E/RP.
