= Wayne Goodman =

American psychiatrist and researcher

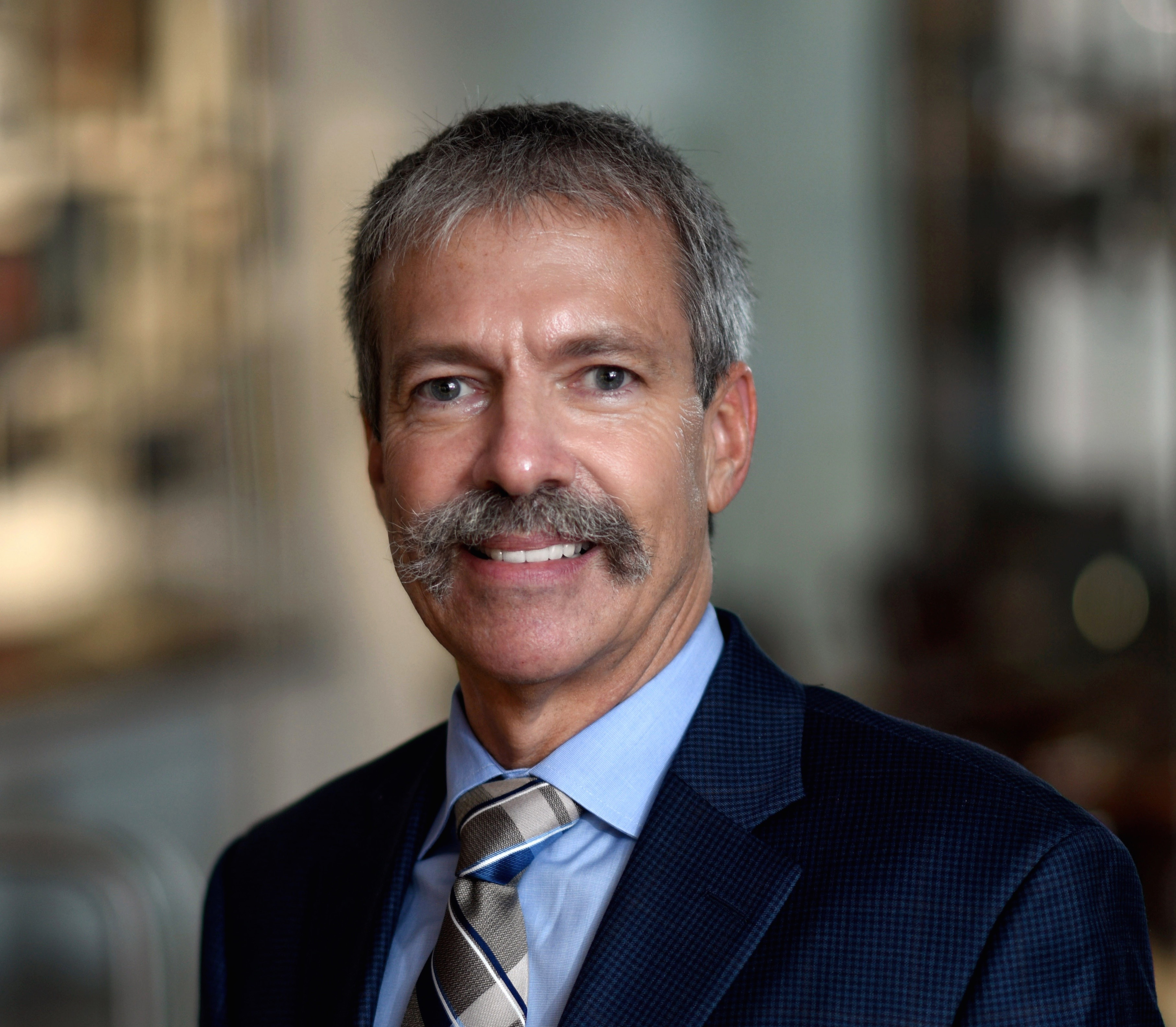
- American psychiatrist and researcher
- Education: Columbia University; Boston University School of Medicine; Yale School of Medicine
- Known for: Obsessive Compulsive Disorder, Yale-Brown Obsessive Compulsive Scale International OCD Foundation, Deep Brain Stimulation
- Scientific career
- Fields: Psychiatry, Neurology
- Workplaces: Baylor College of Medicine, Icahn School of Medicine at Mount Sinai

Wayne Goodman is an American psychiatrist and researcher who specializes in obsessive–compulsive disorder (OCD). He is the principal developer, along with his colleagues, of the Yale–Brown Obsessive–Compulsive Scale (Y-BOCS).

In 2016, Goodman was appointed the D. C. and Irene Ellwood Professor and chair of the Menninger Department of Psychiatry and Behavioral Sciences at Baylor College of Medicine. He is also an adjunct professor in the Department of Electrical and Computer Engineering at Rice University.

== Biography ==
Prior to joining Baylor, Goodman was professor and chairman of the Department of Psychiatry at the Icahn School of Medicine at Mount Sinai and The Mount Sinai Behavioral Health System for seven years. During his tenure, the department rose to be among the top ten in the nation in research funding from the National Institutes of Health.

Goodman also served as director of the Division of Adult Translational Research and Treatment Development at the National Institute of Mental Health from 2007 to 2009. He was chairman of the Department of Psychiatry at the University of Florida in Gainesville for nine years.

A native of New York City, Goodman attended the Bronx High School of Science and graduated from Columbia University with a degree in electrical engineering. He received his medical degree from Boston University School of Medicine and completed his internship, residency, and research fellowship at Yale School of Medicine, where he remained on faculty for seven years.

== Major accomplishments in OCD ==
=== Yale–Brown Obsessive–Compulsive Scale (Y-BOCS) ===
In 1985, Goodman founded and served as chief of the OCD Clinic at Yale University. During this time, along with his colleagues Lawrence Price and Steven Rasmussen, he developed the Y-BOCS, which is widely used in research and clinical practice to determine the severity of OCD and to monitor improvement during treatment. It has since been translated into numerous languages. A 2024 systematic review continued to support the efficacy of the Y-BOCS and its adaptations in assessing OCD severity and treatment outcomes in both adults and children.

Goodman and his colleagues have also developed the Yale–Brown Obsessive–Compulsive Scale—Second Edition (Y-BOCS-II) in an effort to modify the original scale. Other rating scales developed by Goodman and his colleagues include: the Children's Yale-Brown Obsessive Compulsive Scale (CY-BOCS), Florida Obsessive Compulsive Inventory (FOCI), the Children's Florida Obsessive Compulsive Inventory (C-FOCI), Level 2—Repetitive Thoughts and Behaviors (Cross-cutting symptom measure used in the DSM-5), and the Treatment-Emergent Activation and Suicidality Assessment Profile (TEASAP).

By July 2018, Goodman's original article on the Yale–Brown Obsessive–Compulsive Scale was the most cited paper on obsessive–compulsive disorder.

=== Selective serotonin reuptake inhibitors ===
Goodman was one of the first investigators to test and establish the efficacy of selective serotonin reuptake inhibitors (SSRIs) in OCD and show their comparative advantage over other antidepressant medications. He also developed the use of adjunctive antipsychotic medications in SSRI-resistant OCD and found that patients with comorbid tic disorders are most likely to respond to this combination.

=== International OCD Foundation ===
In 1986, Goodman co-founded the nonprofit OCD Foundation (now named the International OCD Foundation). While on faculty at Yale University, he had the idea to bring together a group of dedicated individuals with OCD who were participating in research studies for a self-help group. They later expanded and started a foundation to help reach a wider audience and educate the public about OCD and treatment options. He served as chair of its scientific advisory board for the first ten years. Goodman received the Lifetime Career Achievement Award from the International OCD Foundation in 2012.

=== Deep brain stimulation ===
Goodman conducts research in the use of Deep brain stimulation (DBS) for treatment-resistant psychiatric disorders. He has published on the use of DBS for intractable OCD. In October 2016, The National Institute of Neurological Disorders and Stroke awarded him a grant for research aimed at developing adaptive DBS for OCD. Other grants include an award in 2025 to evaluate the preliminary efficacy and safety of DBS in treatment-resistant bipolar depression. The funding is part of the Brain Research through Advancing Innovative Neurotechnologies (BRAIN) Initiative.

== Service with the Food and Drug Administration ==
Goodman served as chair of the FDA Psychopharmacology Drug Advisory Committee (PDAC) from 2004 to 2008. During that time period, the FDA deliberated and eventually decided to require a Black Box warning on suicidality for all antidepressant drugs. Goodman voted in favor of the Black Box warning for the pediatric population in 2004. Two years later, he voted that the warning be extended up to age 24. He has also served on the FDA Neurological Devices Advisory Committee.

== Memberships in Professional Societies ==
- In 2022, Goodman was admitted as a member to the Association of American Physicians (AAP). Election to the AAP is an honor extended to physicians with outstanding credentials in basic or translational biomedical research and is limited to 70 persons per year.
- In 2018, Goodman was named a fellow of the American College of Neuropsychopharmacology (ACNP). Members are selected primarily based on their original research contributions.
- In 2018, Goodman was named a Distinguished Life Fellow by the American Psychiatric Association (APA). This is the highest membership honor the APA bestows in recognition of significant contributions to the field of psychiatry.
- In 2003, Goodman was named to the national Alpha Omega Alpha Honor Medical Society.
