= Gary Roy Geffken =

American psychologist

Gary Roy Geffken is an American clinical psychologist from Gainesville, Florida. As director of the University of Florida Obsessive Compulsive Disorder Program, Geffken participates in clinical activity and research. Geffken's primary research interests include Obsessive Compulsive Disorder and Type 1 Diabetes.

Geffken's research into Obsessive Compulsive Disorder has primarily focused on predictors of treatment outcome and treatment augmentation strategies. Geffken has also been involved in the development of OCD specific assessment measures. Geffken's most recent OCD research has focused on pediatric OCD treatment outcome.

Geffken's research into Type 1 Diabetes has focused on predictors of glycemic control. Geffken has had a specific interest in family factors that predict glycemic control. Recently, Geffken has examined the impact of internet use on diabetes management.
