= Mazure =

Mazure is a family name. People with the surname Mazure include:

- Alfred Mazure (1914–1974), Dutch cartoonist, writer and filmmaker
- Carolyn M. Mazure (1949-), medical researcher
- Edmond Mazure (1860–1939) South Australian winemaker
- Jannes Pieter Mazure (1899–1990), outspoken Dutch politician
- Sébastien Mazure (born 1979) French football player
