= IBTS =

IBTS may refer to:

- Irish Blood Transfusion Service
- International Baptist Theological Seminary, Prague, Czech Republic

== See also ==
- IBT (disambiguation)
