= Transformation obsession =

Symptom of Obsessive–compulsive disorder

A transformation obsession is a lesser known symptom and manifestation of obsessive–compulsive disorder (OCD).

A person with a transformation obsession fears transforming into someone or something else. Losing one's self or taking on undesired characteristics brings about anxiety and fear. Rituals such as counting, blinking, checking, hand washing, and others may eliminate the anxiety when they are done in a way which "feels right". Misdiagnosis is also frequent, which can lead to inappropriate treatments. In some cases, cognitive behavioral therapy (CBT) can be beneficial, which allows patients to develop strategies to counteract these obsessions, and thus make clinical progress.

S. Rachman was the first to describe this phenomenon in his 2006 book called Fear of Contamination.
