= Carolyn M. Mazure =

American psychiatrist

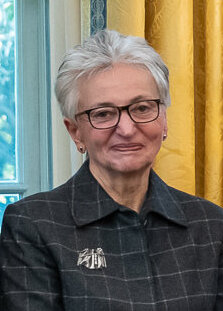
Carolyn M. Mazure

Carolyn M. Mazure is a Clinical Psychologist and the Norma Weinberg Spungen and Joan Lebson Bildner Professor Emerita in Women's Health Research, and Professor Emerita of Psychiatry and Psychology, at the Yale School of Medicine. She has held senior leadership roles as a clinician, researcher, and educator at the Yale School of Medicine and in national health policy as the Chair of the White House Initiative on Women’s Health Research, led by Dr. Jill Biden. In 1998, she created Yale’s interdisciplinary research center, Women’s Health Research at Yale – recognized as a national model for launching research across topics ranging from cardiovascular disease to cancer, translating findings, sharing health information with the public and policymakers, and mentoring students and faculty to advance women’s health.

== Research ==
Dr. Mazure’s research has focused on depression, one of the greatest causes of disability for women in the U.S. and globally. She has published extensively on the diagnosis and treatment of depression, and the influence of sex on the interplay of stress, depression, and co-occurring addictive behaviors. She remains committed to advancing research on the health of women and the influence of sex as a biological variable, translating empirical findings into practical and effective interventions, and building public and private sector collaborations to achieve these goals. Current research targets the intersection of biological and social factors affecting the health of women, sex-specific strategies for promoting resilience, and health policies that serve to advance economic stability for women. During her career, she also played a key role in the design of assessments for a wide range of psychiatric conditions that enhanced diagnosis and measured change in treatment outcomes. For example, her collaboration in the assessment of obsessive-compulsive disorder resulted in the Yale-Brown Obsessive Compulsive Scale which was the most cited paper globally on obsessive–compulsive disorder.

== Professional service ==
After three years at the National Institutes of Health and fellowship training at Yale, Mazure joined the Yale faculty — becoming an active clinician and NIH-funded researcher. She was the Director of Psychiatry’s Adult Inpatient Program at Yale-New Haven Hospital for over a decade, and has held a variety of other leadership roles, including twelve years as Associate Dean for Faculty at Yale School of Medicine, the Chief Psychologist for Yale-New Haven Psychiatric Hospital, Scientific Director of NIH-funded SCOR(E) interdisciplinary research grants, and PI of NIH-funded junior faculty training grants.

Mazure served on the planning committee for the First White House Conference on Mental Health, was a fellow for the United States House Committee on Oversight and Government Reform, chaired the American Psychological Association’s Summit on Women and Depression, and has provided testimony to the United States Senate and House of Representatives on the importance of women’s health research. Among her contributions to advancing women’s health, she served on the NIH Office for Research on Women’s Health’s Advisory Committee, and was a Professorial Lecturer in Health Policy at the George Washington University School of Public Health and Health Services. In 2023, Mazure was appointed Chair of the White House Initiative on Women's Health Research, which worked to fundamentally change how the nation approaches and funds women's health research.

== Honors and recognition ==
Mazure has been as been an invited speaker at diverse national and international venues, ranging from the National Academy of Medicine, NASA, the Smithsonian Institution, the Sorbonne, and the International Psychogeriatric Association Meetings in Stockholm, Sweden. She has been a featured expert on ABC’s Prime Time Live and in the BBC documentary The Science of Stress. Her books include Does Stress Cause Psychiatric Illness? and Understanding Depression in Women: Applying Empirical Research to Practice and Policy. Mazure's many accomplishments and accolades include:

- Received the Bernadine Healy Award for Visionary Leadership from Virginia Commonwealth University in 2025
- Appointed to the United States National Medal of Science Committee in 2025
- Received the Elga R. Wasserman Courage, Clarity, and Leadership Award from Yale University in 2024
- Elected to the Connecticut Academy of Science and Engineering in 2010.
- Inducted to the Connecticut Women's Hall of Fame in 2009
- Received the American Psychological Association Distinguished Leadership Award in 2008
- Received the Elizabeth Blackwell Award from the National Organization for Women — Connecticut Chapter in 2007
- Received the Marion Spencer Fay Award from Institute for Women's Health and Leadership in 2007
- Received the Stephen Fleck Clinician and Teacher Faculty Award from the Department of Psychiatry, Yale School of Medicine in 1994
- Served as United States Public Health Service Fellow in 1979

== Selected publications ==
Selected Viewpoints/Perspectives

1) Mazure CM. The White House Initiative on Women’s Health Research. JAMA Internal Medicine, September 30, 2024. doi:10.1001/jamainternmed.2024.3592

2) Davis DR, Krishnan-Sarin S, Mazure CM. Considerations of sex & gender in FDA tobacco regulation: Reducing harm & enhancing public health benefit. JAMA, May 26, 2023. doi: 10.1001/jama.2023.6803

3) Mazure CM, Pietrzak, RH, Husky M. Stress as a risk factor for mental disorders in a gendered environment. JAMA Psychiatry, September 6, 2023. doi: 10.1001/jamapsychiatry.2023.3138

4) Martin K, Mazure CM. Medical education as a moderator of clinical care in haematology: The value of teaching the influence of sex and gender on health outcomes. The Lancet Haematology, 10(5):e318-e319, 2023, May 2023. doi: 10.1016/S2352-3026(23)00055-8

5) Stachenfeld NS, Mazure CM. Precision medicine requires understanding how both sex and gender influence health. Cell, 185(10): 1619-1622, 2022.

6) Becker JB, Mazure CM. The Federal Plan for Health Science and Technology’s Response to the Opioid Crisis: Understanding sex and gender differences as part of the solution is overlooked. Biology of Sex Differences, 10(1):3, 2019.

7) Mazure CM, Fiellin DA. Women and opioids: Something different is happening here. The Lancet, 392:9-11, 2018.

8) Brindis CD, Freund KM, Baecher-Lind L, Bairey Merz CN, Carnes M, Gulati M, Joff H, Klein WS, Mazure CM, Pace LE, Regensteiner JG, Redberg RF, Wenger NK, Younger L. The Risk of Remaining Silent: Addressing the current threats to women’s health. Women’s Health Issues, 27(6):621-624, 2017.

9) Mazure CM. Our evolving science: Studying the influence of sex in preclinical research. Biology of Sex Differences, 7:15, 2016. doi: 10.1186/s13293-016-0068-8, Epub only.

10) Mazure CM, Swendsen J. Sex differences in Alzheimer’s disease and other dementias. The Lancet Neurology, 15 (5):451-452, 2016.

Selected Reviews

11) Smith MV, Mazure CM. Mental health and wealth: Depression, gender, poverty, and parenting. Annual Review of Clinical Psychology, 17:181-205, 2021.

12) Husky MM, Pietrzak RH, Marx BP, Mazure CM. Research on posttraumatic stress disorder in the context of the COVID-19 pandemic: A review of methods and implications in general population samples. Chronic Stress, 5:1-15, 2021.

13) Goetz TG, Becker JB, Mazure CM. Women, opioids, and addiction. FASEB Journal, Feb,35(2):e21303, 2021. doi:10.1096/fj.202002125R

14) Schmaal L, van Harmelen AL, Chatzi V, Lippard ETC, Toenders YJ, Averill LA, Mazure CM, Blumberg HP. Imaging suicidal thoughts and behaviors: a comprehensive review of two decades of neuroimaging studies. Molecular Psychiatry, Feb 25 2021, (2):408-427. doi: 10.1038/s41380-019-0587

15) Mazure CM, Jones DP. Twenty years and still counting: Including women as participants and studying sex and gender in biomedical research. BMC Women’s Health, 2015, 15:94, doi: 10.1186/s12905-015-0251-9, Epub only.

Selected Articles

16) Larson H, Guru A, Martin K, Pisani M, Mazure CM. A novel framework to integrate data on sex as a biological variable into medical education. Journal of Women's Health, December 2025. doi:10.1177/15409996251405072

17) Yang R, Fischer IC, Na PJ, Mazure CM, Pietrzak RH. Sex differences in PTSD among U.S. military veterans: Role of trauma, coping, and social factors. Journal of Clinical Psychiatry, 2025;86(1):24br15621

18) Nam S, Jeon, S, Ordway M, Mazure CM, Sinha R, Yau L, Iennaco J. Mindfulness-based therapy for insomnia in Black women: A pilot randomized controlled trial. Journal of Behavioral Medicine, September 21, 2024. doi: 10.1007/s10865-024-00521-2

19) Cigarroa N, Latif N, Maayah M, Khokhar A, Kunnirickal S, Schwann A, Maciejewski KR, Odanovic N, Mazure CM, Spatz E, Pfau S, Lansky A, Shah SM. Diagnostic yield and clinical utility of coronary angiography versus coronary function testing in women with angina and non-obstructive coronary arteries. Journal of the American Heart Association, September 18, 2024. doi: 10.1161/JAHA.124.035852

20) Maayah M, Latif N, Vijay A, Gallegos CM, Cigarroa N, Posada Martinez EL, Mazure CM, Miller EJ, Spatz ES, Shah SS. Evaluating Ischemic Heart Disease in Women: Focus on angina with non-obstructive coronary arteries (ANOCA). Journal of the Society for Cardiovascular Angiography & Interventions, August 2024, 3(8). doi: 10.1016/j.jscai.2024.102195

21) Hennein R, Lowe SR, Feingold JH, Peccoralo LA, Ripp JA, Mazure CM, Pietrzak RH. Pre- and peri-traumatic event stressors drive gender differences in chronic stress-related psychological sequelae: A prospective cohort study of COVID-19 frontline healthcare providers. Journal of Psychiatric Research, 2023, 162:88-94. doi: 10.1016/j.jpsychires.2023.04.009

22) Colic L, Clark A, Sankar A, Rathi DJ, Goldman D, Kim D, Villa L, Edmiston KE, Lippard ETC, Pittman B, Constable RT, Mazure CM, Blumberg HP. Gender-related association among childhood maltreatment, brain structure and clinical features of bipolar disorder. European Neuropsychopharmacology, Oct (63):35-46, 2022. doi: 10.1016/j.euroneuro.2022.07.186. PMCID: PMC9593266

23) Jan J, Osho A, Murphy CC, Mazure CM, Singal AG, Rich NE. Gender, age, racial, and ethnic disparities in clinical trial enrollment for primary liver cancer. Gastroenterology, Mar 12, 2022, S0016-5085(22)00266-9. doi: 10.1053/j.gastro.2022.03.015.

24) Lowe SR, Hennein R, Feingold JH, Peccoralo LA, Ripp JA, Mazure CM, Pietrzak RH. Are women less psychologically resilient than men? Background stressors underlying gender differences in reports of stress-related psychological sequelae. Journal of Clinical Psychiatry, 2021, doi.org/10.4088/JCP.21br14098

25) Finkelstein-Fox L, Sinnott SM, Lee SY, Carney LM, Park CL, Mazure CM, Hoff R. Meaningful military engagement among male and female post-9/11 Veterans: An examination of correlates and implications for resilience. Journal of Clinical Psychology, 2021, 77:2167–2186. doi:10.1002/jclp.23150

26) Zakiniaeiz Y, Hillmer AT, Matuskey D, Nabulsi N, Huang YH, Ropchan J, Mazure CM, Picciotto MR, McKee SA, Morris ED, Cosgrove EP. Sex differences in dorsolateral prefrontal cortical amphetamine- Induced dopamine release in tobacco smokers. Neuropsychopharmacology, 2019, 44(13):2205-2211.

27) Thande NK, Wang M, Curlin K, Dalvie N, Mazure CM. The Influence of sex and gender on health: How much is being taught in medical school curricula? Journal of Women’s Health, 2019, 28(12):1748-1754. doi:10.1089/jwh.2018.7229

28) Husky MM, Mazure CM, Kovess-Masfety V. Gender differences in psychiatric and medical comorbidity with post-traumatic stress disorder. Comprehensive Psychiatry, 2018, 84:75-81.

29) Edmiston EE, Wang F, Mazure CM, Sinha R, Mayes LC, Blumberg HP. Corticostriatal-imbic gray matter morphology in adolescents exposed to childhood maltreatment. Archives of Pediatrics and Adolescent Medicine, 2011, 165(12):1069-1077.

30) Mazure CM, Toll BA, McKee SA, Wu R, O’Malley SM. Menstrual cycle phase at quit date and smoking abstinence at six weeks in an open label trial of bupropion. Drug and Alcohol Dependence, 2011, 114:68-72.

31) Maciejewski PK, Prigerson HG, Mazure CM. Sex differences in event-related risk for major depression. Psychological Medicine, 2001, 31:593-604.

Selected Assessments for Psychiatric Conditions

32) Hyman SM, Garcia M, Mazure CM, Sinha R. A gender specific psychometric analysis of the Early Trauma Interview Short Form in cocaine dependent adults. Addictive Behaviors, 30(4): 847-852, 2005.

33) Bremner JD, Vermetten E, Mazure CM. Development and preliminary psychometric properties of an instrument for the measurement of childhood trauma: The Early Trauma Inventory. Depression and Anxiety, 12:1-12, 2000.

34) Calvocoressi L, Mazure CM, Kasl SV, Skolnick J, Fisk D, Vegso SJ, Van Noppen BL, Price LH. Family Accommodation of Obsessive-Compulsive Symptoms: Instrument development and assessment of family behavior. Journal of Nervous & Mental Disease, 187(10):636-642, 1999.

35) Bremner JD, Mazure CM, Putnam FW, Southwick SM, Marmar C, Hansen C, Lubin H, Roach L, Freeman G, Krystal JH, Charney DS. Measurement of dissociative states with the Clinician-Administered Dissociative States Scale (CADSS). Journal of Traumatic Stress, 11(1):125-136, 1998.

36) Mazure CM, Kincare P, Schaffer CE. DSM‑III‑R Axis IV: Clinician reliability and comparability to patients' reports of stressor severity. Psychiatry, 58(1):56-64, 1995. doi/10.1080/00332747.1995.11024711

37) Mazure CM, Cellar JS, Bowers MB Jr., Nelson JC, Takeshita J, Zigun B. Assessment of extrapyramidal symptoms during acute neuroleptic treatment. Journal of Clinical Psychiatry, 56:94-100, 1995.

38) Mazure CM, Halmi KA, Sunday SR, Romano SJ, Einhorn AM. The Yale-Brown-Cornell Eating Disorder Scale: Development, use, reliability and validity. Journal of Psychiatry Research, 28:425-445, 1994.

39) Goodman WK, Price LH, Rasmussen SA, Mazure CM, Fleischmann R, Hill C, Heninger GR, Charney DS. The Yale‑Brown Obsessive‑Compulsive Scale (Y‑BOCS): Part I. Development, Use, and Reliability. Archives of General Psychiatry, 46(11):1006‑1011, 1989.

40) Goodman WK, Price LH, Rasmussen SA, Mazure CM, Delgado P, Heninger GR, Charney DS. The Yale‑Brown Obsessive‑Compulsive Scale (Y‑BOCS): Part II. Validity. Archives of General Psychiatry, 46(11):1012‑1018, 1989.

41) Sarrel P, Rousseau M, Mazure CM, Glazer W. Ovarian steroids and the capacity to function at home and in the workplace. Annals of the New York Academy of Sciences, 592:152-161; discussion 185-192, 1990.

42) Nelson JC, Mazure CM, Quinlan DM, Jatlow PI. Drug responsive symptoms in melancholia. Archives of General Psychiatry, 41:663‑668, 1984.

43) Mazure CM, Gershon ES. Blindness and reliability in lifetime psychiatric diagnosis. Archives of General Psychiatry, 36:521‑525, 1979.Did not include

== See also ==
- List of female scientists in the 21st century
- Medical research
- Public Health
