= Yale–Brown Obsessive–Compulsive Scale =

Test to rate OCD symptom severity

The Yale–Brown Obsessive–Compulsive Scale (Y-BOCS) is a test to rate the severity of obsessive–compulsive disorder (OCD) symptoms. The scale, which was designed by Wayne K. Goodman, Steven Rasmussen, Carolyn Mazure, and their colleagues in 1989, is used extensively in research and clinical practice to both determine severity of OCD and to monitor improvement during treatment. This scale, which measures obsessions separately from compulsions, specifically measures the severity of symptoms of obsessive–compulsive disorder without being biased towards or against the type of content the obsessions or compulsions might present.

Following the original publication, the total score is usually computed from the subscales for obsessions (items 1–5) and compulsions (items 6–10), but other algorithms exist. By July 2018, the original 1989 article describing Y-BOCS was the most cited paper on obsessive–compulsive disorder.

== Accuracy and modifications ==
Goodman and his colleagues have developed the Yale–Brown Obsessive–Compulsive Scale—Second Edition (Y-BOCS-II) in an effort to modify the original scale which, according to Goodman, "[has become] the gold standard measure of obsessive–compulsive disorder (OCD) symptom severity". In creating the Y-BOCS-II, changes were made "to the Severity Scale item content and scoring framework, integrating avoidance into the scoring of Severity Scale items, and modifying the Symptom Checklist content and format". After reliability tests, Goodman concluded that "Taken together, the Y-BOCS-II has excellent psychometric properties in assessing the presence and severity, of obsessive–compulsive symptoms. Although the Y-BOCS remains a reliable and valid measure, the Y-BOCS-II may provide an alternative method of assessing symptom presence and severity".

Studies have been conducted by members of the Iranian Journal of Psychiatry and Clinical Psychology to determine the accuracy of the Yale–Brown Obsessive–Compulsive Scale (specifically as it appears in its Persian format). The members applied the scale to a group of individuals and, after ensuring a normal distribution of data, a series of reliability tests were performed. According to the authors, "[the] results supported satisfactory validity and reliability of translated form of Yale–Brown Obsessive–Compulsive Scale for research and clinical diagnostic applications".

== Children's version ==
The children's version of the Y-BOCS, or the Children's Yale–Brown Obsessive–Compulsive Scales (CY-BOCS), is a clinician-report questionnaire designed to assess symptoms of obsessive–compulsive disorder from childhood through early adolescence.

The CY-BOCS contains 70 questions and takes about 15 to 25 minutes. Each question is designed to ask about symptoms of obsessive–compulsive behavior, though the exact breakdown of questions is unknown. For each question, children rate the degree to which the question applies on a scale of 0–4. Based on research, this assessment has been found to be statistically valid and reliable, but not necessarily helpful with moderate accuracy for identifying children who may require further evaluation for OCD.

Of note, the CY-BOCS is typically used in clinical settings and was the primary outcome measure used in a 2025 network meta-analysis of 71 trials that compared different treatments for pediatric OCD However, in research settings other questionnaires are typically used such as Anxiety Disorder Interview Scale-Child Version (ADIS-C) or the Mini International Neuropsychiatric Interview for Children and Adolescents (MINI-KID).

=== Other versions ===
The CY-BOCS has been adapted into several self- and parent-report versions, designed to be completed by parent and child working together, although most have not been psychometrically validated. However, these versions still ask the child to rate the severity of their obsessive–compulsive behaviors and the degree to which each has been impairing. While this measure has been found to be useful in a clinic setting, scores and interpretations are taken with a grain of salt, given the lack of validation.

Another version, which is parent-focused, is similar to the original CY-BOCS and is administered to both parent and child by the clinician. This version was distributed by Solvay Pharmaceuticals in the late 1990s, creating an association between the measure and a number of pharmaceutical groups that has caused it to be avoided by most clinicians. Severity cutoff scores for this version have not been empirically determined.

== See also ==
- List of diagnostic classification and rating scales used in psychiatry
