= Steven Rasmussen =

American psychiatrist

Steven Alan Rasmussen is an American psychiatrist, best known for his research on the course and treatment of obsessive–compulsive disorder (OCD). He is currently the Professor and Chair of the Department of Psychiatry and Human Behavior at the Alpert Medical School of Brown University.

A member of the second graduating class of the Program in Liberal Medical Education, Rasmussen earned his Master of Medical Sciences and Doctor of Medicine degrees from Brown University in 1977. He completed his residency in psychiatry at Yale University in 1983.

Rasmussen joined the Brown faculty in 1983 and served as the Medical Director of Butler Hospital from 1998 to 2012. In 2013, he was appointed the Chair of the Department of Psychiatry and Human Behavior at the Alpert Medical School in Brown University. He is a member of the Society for Neuroscience, the American Psychiatric Association, and Sigma Xi.

Rasmussen's research primarily focuses on obsessive–compulsive disorder (OCD) and neuromodulatory treatments for psychiatric disorders. By July 2018, Rasmussen's original article on the Yale-Brown Obsessive Compulsive Scale was the most cited paper on OCD.

Rasmussen has received several awards and honors for his work. In 2001, the National Alliance for the Mentally Ill (NAMI) honored Rasmussen with an Exemplary Psychiatrist Award. The Leksell Society presented him the Pioneer in Radiosurgery Award in 2006.
