= Inferential confusion =

Mistaking an imagined possibility for a real probability

Inferential confusion is a meta-cognitive state of confusion that becomes pathological when an individual fails to interpret reality correctly and considers an obsessional belief or subjective reality as an actual probability. It causes an individual to mistrust their senses and rely on self-created narratives ignoring evidence and the objectivity of events. These self-created narratives come from memories, information, and associations that are not related- therefore, it deals with the fictional nature of obsessions. It causes the individual to overestimate the threat.

== Inverse Inference ==
Inverse inference, the inverse of normal inference, is a critical concept of inferential confusion. A person starts out believing in the truthfulness of a theory even though evidence suggests otherwise creating uncertainty about an actual state causing distress. Inverse inference limits a person's ability to refrain from neutralising behaviour, which could explain how attempting to neutralise distressing thoughts actually causes more uncertainty and distress.

== Inferential confusion and OCD ==
Inferential confusion is a predictor of obsessive–compulsive disorder (OCD) symptoms since value is not placed on the content of the imaginative obsessions but rather on how they are interpreted.The inference-based approach suggests that OCD is a product of distorted inductive thinking where the obsessions are conceptualised as conclusions about possible states of affairs, based on an inductive narrative that holds distinctive emotional themes. Individuals with OCD also report that their obsessions are largely based on a hypothetical reality lacking direct sensory evidence leading to feelings of distress and anxiety. The role of inferential confusion therefore leads to formations of obsessions that include a probability of imagined, frightened selves. A person tends to fear the development of this attribute for which there is again no direct evidence- this fear of oneself and inferential confusion are attributes of those with OCD. Several reasoning errors have been identified by O'Connor & Robillard (1995), which could provide credence to the obsessional inference. Specifically, category errors, drawing inferences from irrelevant memories, facts, and unconnected associations, and a dismissal of actual data while basing action on a hypothetical reality. These reasoning errors bring about inferential confusion where an individual mixes an imagined possibility with a genuine probability leading to more severe symptoms of OCD. Therefore, OCD is considered as a belief disorder alike delusion highlighting the role of non-phobic factors in the onset and maintenance of this disorder.

Aardema et al. (2005) developed the inferential questionnaire to further expand on the construct of inferential confusion by collecting data from participants suffering from OCD. The questionnaire involved two critical thinking strategies: Inverse reasoning and a distrust of senses. The results from the questionnaire demonstrated a strong correlation between inferential confusion and OCD symptoms suggesting that inferential confusion is a characteristic of OCD.

== Diagnosis: The Inference Based Approach (IBA) ==
The IBA (inference-based approach)/IBT (inference based therapy) is a common technique to treat highly OCD symptoms that are usually explained by inferential confusion. It conceptualizes OCD as a belief disorder that highlights the remoteness of obsessional cognitive representation from the frightening object or event and signifies the reasoning process behind OCD. This approach suggests how a person reacts to a possibility of what might happen and not what is actually happening or even an exaggerated version of it. One of the treatments of OCD involve cognitive-behaviour therapy (CBT) which conceptualises that a person holding pre-existing beliefs may be more sensitized to strongly reacting to intrusive thoughts. It focuses more on the pre-existing beliefs an individual holds instead of the initial intrusions of doubt. Even though this treatment has gained recognition there are still a substantial number of patients with abnormal investment in obsessional beliefs who have not improved. Therefore, over the past 10 years an improved model called the inference-based approach (IBA) was developed which suggested that obsessions can come in various degrees of belief and practicality- this treatment was more effective than CBT amongst patients causing a significant decline in the symptoms.

Recently, a series of psychological experiments in the 2000s have explored the Inference-based approach and thereby inferential confusion as well. A study conducted by Aardema, Connor, Delorme, and Audet tested the inference-based approach treatment on OCD patients and its symptom subtypes. Later this study was replicated, and extensions were added to test ideas further and expand on the findings- the studies concluded that the inference-based approach treatment was effective in improving OCD patients who had overvalued ideation.

== Criticisms of the Inference Based Approach ==
- Only a few research studies looked for the crucial assumptions of the Inference Based Approach, other aspects of inferential confusion such as irrelevant associations, category errors, facts taken out of context, and individual differences in the level of absorption have not yet been integrated in research.
- Because some of these studies used non-clinical samples or did not include an anxious control group, there is ambiguity about the findings and if they can be generalised to OCD (in the first case) or are specific to OCD (in the second case).
- Despite the fact that the majority of the investigations were done by a single research group, they have been replicated by other groups. Nonetheless, the model requires more empirical evidence. Internal narratives are being investigated to see if they precede obsessional doubts or are a post-hoc justification for obsessional doubts, as well as the process of transformation during IBT (Inference Based Therapy).

== Cultural Differences ==
Culture tends to influence several aspects of an individual's psychology, including their perceptions, beliefs, and interpretations of the situation around them and their symptoms. Evolutionarily these cultural groups tend to socially boycott and avoid individuals that are 'contaminated or sinful'. Due to gene-culture co-evolution, these deep-rooted beliefs have been passed on over generations creating exaggerated obsessions where an individual persistently feels 'contaminated' even though direct sensory evidence suggests otherwise.

=== Religion ===
Several cross-sectional research studies have demonstrated a link between religiosity and OCD-related maladaptive attitudes such as overvaluing responsibility, perfectionism, and the importance and control of thoughts. Some religions' rigorous and meticulous rules may cause misinterpretation of intrusive thoughts, as well as a persistent desire to control these ideas and guilt. These ideas cause the individual to obsess over hypothetical reality even though their sensory evidence suggests otherwise in order to maintain being 'virtuous' and an ingroup member. In many cases the severity of these obsessions may vary, causing the degree of inferential confusion to differ. The three processes, main threat evaluations of intrusions, increased mental control effort, and misunderstanding of unsuccessful thought control, are regarded to be especially important in strongly religious people who value personal control over undesired and undesirable intrusive thoughts and pictures.
