= IBT =

IBT or ibt may refer to:

== Organizations ==
- Institute for Bible Translation
- Investors Bank & Trust, a former custodian bank which merged into State Street Bank and Trust Company
- International Bridge and Terminal Company, a railway in Canada
- International Brotherhood of Teamsters, a labor union, commonly known as Teamsters
- Aarhus University, Institute of Business and Technology (AU-IBT), Herning, Denmark
- Industrial Bio-Test Laboratories, a defunct American research company

== Other uses ==
- International Business Times, a global business and financial newspaper
- Identity by type, a characteristic of some genetic alleles
- Immunobead Test (IBT), see antisperm antibodies
- Indirect Branch Tracking, an Intel technology for enforcing control-flow integrity
- Inference-based therapy, a psychotherapy for treating obsessive-compulsive disorder
- International Business and Technology Program, also known as IBT
- Internet-based Test (TOEFL iBT), of TOEFL
- Interbasin transfer, a transfer of water from one river basin to another
