= Cognitive behavioral training =

Training method to improve cognitive function

Cognitive behavioral training (CBTraining), sometimes referred to as structured cognitive behavioral training (SCBT) is an organized process that uses systematic, highly-structured tasks designed to improve cognitive functions. Functions such as working memory, decision making, and attention are thought to inform whether a person defaults to an impulsive behavior or a premeditated behavior. The aim of CBTraining is to affect a person's decision-making process and cause them to choose the premeditated behavior over the impulsive behavior in their everyday life. Through scheduled trainings that may be up to a few hours long and may be weekly or daily over a specific set of time, the goal of CBTraining is to show that focusing on repetitive, increasingly difficult cognitive tasks can transfer those skills to other cognitive processes in your brain, leading to behavioral change. There has been a recent resurgence of interest in this field with the invention of new technologies and a greater understanding of cognition in general.

The roots of CBTraining lie in a combination of cognitive behavioral therapy (CBT) and general cognitive training. Cognitive training seeks to improve cognitive functions for the sake of improved brain processing ability. The basic premise of CBT is that behavior is inextricably related to beliefs, thoughts and emotions. Between those two mentalities lies the idea that in changing the way a person responds to stimulus through training, it is possible to change a person's actions.

However, the positive effects of CBTraining have been difficult to prove throughout the field of research. Lack of randomized controlled trials (RCTs) in many studies and a lack of a standardization of training methods and definitions of success make it difficult to compare studies with each other and find trends. Overall, many clinical reviews conclude that initial results expressing the benefits of CBTraining may have been overestimated, but the data shows positive enough results that continued research is encouraged.

== Description ==
=== Methods ===
Cognitive behavioral training is a cognitive-based process designed with the aim to systematically break down emotionally driven dependencies and behaviors, replacing them with behaviors that are based on rational choice. Testing can be computerized or gamified. Bickel et al. describe this method of training as such, "adaptive-training programs rely on computerized algorithms that adjust intervention content to a patient's skill level in realtime in order to tax participants at the limit of their capacity and maintain engagement during training." Nixon and Lewis note that programs which adjust to participants' skill levels are more successful at encouraging participants to complete trainings since the testing itself can be repetitive and uninteresting.

Inhibitory control training (ICT) is a method of CBTraining, which uses cues paired with promoting or inhibiting stimulus to change behavior. These cues can be general or specific to an undesirable behavior and use Go/no go or Stop-Signal tests. An example of a cue-specific ICT test was used in Stice et al.'s study designed to limit unhealthy food consumption by combining inhibitory signals with images of unhealthy food more often than non-food-related images.

Working memory training (WMT) is a method that targets working memory enhancements as a vehicle for changing behavior. Working memory is "the ability to retain some information active for further use, and to do so in a flexible way allowing information to be prioritized, added, or removed." Self-regulatory and goal-maintaining behavior has been tied to working memory so WMT has emerged as a way to alter behavior through improving cognition. For example, Snider et al. sought to extend the time-related reward window in patients with alcohol dependency by improving working memory so they created twelve training exercises including one that had participants move objects on a digital desk while following auditory instructions in a particular order.

Attentional bias modification (ABM) seeks to change an individual's behavior by directing their attention away from undesired cues and sometimes includes neutral cues that attention is directed towards. This is commonly carried out by a visual probe test like the one used by Kerst et al. on a handheld mobile device given to habitual cigarette smokers. Participants were asked to engage in three trainings and one assessment per day over a one week period and self report cravings and alterations, if any, in smoking habits.

=== Difference from CBT ===
Although CBTraining employs some similar concepts that define cognitive behavioral therapy, there are some fundamental differences between CBTraining and CBT, both in philosophy and in application. CBTraining is training, not therapy. This is a critical distinction: unlike typical forms and applications of CBT, CBTraining is a process that is finite. In CBT, as with most therapy, the patient plays a large role in determining the direction of the therapy, including the intensity and duration. A CBTraining course, or program, is often broken up into a series of progressive, strategically ordered sessions designed to guide the participant through the process of training the brain away from impulsive thinking. The goal is to adjust the automatic processes that lead to undesired behaviors through repetitious training sessions designed to promote a desired behavior. CBTraining aims to change participants' behaviors through seemingly unrelated tasks by demonstrating near transfer (application of improved skills to circumstances that are very similar to those of the trained task) and far transfer (application of improved skills to circumstances that are very different from those of the trained task).

== Willpower ==
In addressing addictive behavior and other potentially destructive behavior compelling to the participant, CBTraining may incorporate an urge conditioning/desensitization approach that is a proactive form of acceptance and commitment therapy (ACT). This approach stands in contrast to what is commonly most instinctive to people (urge avoidance), and seems counter-intuitive at first. The approach of urge desensitization has been applied to patients with gambling addictions, and research has shown it to be effective. When a person is trying to quit smoking, for instance, the instinct is to remove all smoking paraphernalia from his presence. While this "out of sight, out of mind" approach seems to make sense, it does nothing to actually deal with the emotionally driven urge to smoke. A measure of success that is vital for positive results, but not often recorded in studies, is the determination to complete the program and adjust behaviors.

Further distinguishing CBTraining from its closely related psychological predecessors is the inclusion of the concept of "training" in place of "therapy". CBTraining is a planned, intricately designed and systematically applied regimen that is purposely finite. CBTraining begins with a specific goal, and is constructed as a time-specific road map to achieving the goal.

== History of development ==
Along with CBT, CBTraining also owes some debt to Albert Ellis's rational emotive behavior therapy (REBT), formerly known as Rational Emotive Therapy. REBT is classified as a form of CBT, and is anchored by the belief that a person is "affected emotionally by his/her perspective and attitude about outside things." As with CBTraining, REBT incorporates Positive Self-Image Psychology. Lou Ryan, a pioneer in the creation, development, and practical application of CBTraining, worked for some time under the guidance of Albert Ellis. In the early 1980s, Ryan, who was well-versed in Ellis's theories and philosophies, met Ellis in Hawaii after a series of seminars. Ellis recognized his own impact in Ryan's CBTraining programs, and played a peripheral part in some of the development.

== Specific applications ==
=== Health and wellness ===
CBTraining has been established to some degree in changing emotionally addictive behaviors related to tobacco. There is evidence that cognitive group behavioral training may be beneficial for patients with type 1 diabetes in their self-care. SCBT has been used to help people with diabetes manage their disease, with the primary goal being maintained lifestyle changes to slow or halt the progression of the disease. It has also shown some promise in reducing pain receptor reactions in the brain after a painful stimulus.

In studies of overeating and obesity, researchers note that high impulsivity is correlated with overweight and obese individuals. CBTraining in the form of response inhibition training has shown positive results affecting amount and type of food eaten in a sitting and weight reduction, though the longevity of results requires more study.

=== Addiction ===
Alcohol use disorder (AUD) and substance use disorder (SUD) have been correlated to cognitive impairments, though it is not known if one is cause for the other. Verdejo-Garcia et al. specifically indicate AUD and SUD patients display "deficits in reward and salience valuation, executive functions, and decision-making." Continued engagement in treatment programs for these diseases has also been related to cognitive levels leading researchers to aim to promote program engagement through improving cognitive skills in AUD and SUD patients. One study showed improvements in self-control and delayed reward valuation in participants who completed several working memory training sessions, but those gains did not transfer to other inhibition skills. The field of studying CBTraining in AUD and SUD patients suffers from lack of randomized controlled trials making it difficult to quantify results. Nixon and Lewis argue that with studies in this field, it is not sufficient to only show improvements in memory recall and decision-making, but those improvements must be applicable to participants' lives outside of the study, their continued sobriety and engagement in society.

=== PTSD ===
CBTraining has been applied to symptoms of post-traumatic stress disorder in one study by showing participants traumatizing video clips and then having them play a game of Tetris for a specific amount of time. The study was designed to replace the act of recalling a traumatic memory, which is a visuospatial memory process, with another visuospatial activity within the desired time window in order to disrupt the brain's ability to solidify the original memory. Minimal results were reported.

=== Disease management ===
Cognitive Behavioral Training, applied in a structured way, has been used to deal effectively with women dealing with the stressors of having breast cancer (e.g., changing thoughts about stressors) in studies done at the University of Miami.

=== In adolescents with behavior disorders ===
Two studies examining CBTraining gamification applied to autism spectrum disorder used three levels of the game Junior Detective Training Program and 20 hours of the game Let's Face It! respectively to teach children to recognize facial cues, physical positions and other forms of emotional communication with moderately positive results.

== Efficacy ==
=== Overall criticisms ===
Although studies have been limited, initial data indicates that success with CBTraining is largely dependent on the active, cooperative participation of the patient. This essentially means that CBTraining, as it is presented in internet form, is geared towards participants who, in relation to the stages-of-change theory, are in the preparation and action stages. In other words, CBTraining is most effective when applied to people with a high motivation and capacity to change.
