= Inference-based therapy =

Treatment for OCD

Inference-based therapy (IBT), also known as inference-based cognitive behavioral therapy (I-CBT), originated as a form of cognitive therapy developed for treating obsessive–compulsive disorder (OCD). IBT followed the observation that people with OCD often inferred danger on the basis of inverse inference (inferring reality from hypothetical premises). Later the model was extended to inferential confusion, where inverse inference leads to distrust of the senses and investment in remote possibility. In this model, individuals with obsessive–compulsive disorder are hypothesized to put a greater emphasis on an imagined possibility than on what can be perceived with the senses, and to confuse the imagined possibility with reality (inferential confusion). According to inference-based therapy, obsessional thinking occurs when the person replaces reality and real probabilities with imagined possibilities; the obsession is hypothesized to concern a doubt about a possible state of affairs.

According to inference-based therapy, individuals with obsessive–compulsive disorder attempt to resolve the doubt by modifying reality (via compulsions and neutralizations) which merely increase the imaginary pathological doubt rather than resolve it since reality is not the problem. Obsessions are hypothesized to begin with the initial doubt ("Maybe I could be dirty") which is not a normal intrusion but a sign that the person is already in obsessional thinking.

Inference-based therapy hypothesizes that the doubt and investment in possibilities leave the person vulnerable to spiral into further imagined connections and dissociative absorption in what could further transpire.

== History ==
Inference-based therapy was developed in the late 1990s for treating obsessive–compulsive disorder. Initially, the model was developed mostly for obsessive–compulsive disorder with overt compulsions and for individuals presenting obsessive–compulsive disorder with overvalued ideas (i.e., obsessions with a bizarre content and strongly invested by the individual, such as feeling dirty after seeing a dirty person), given that the model revolves around the imaginative, often idiosyncratic nature of the obsession. The model was expanded to all types of obsessions and compulsions. Inference-based therapy is now applied to anyone of the OCD spectrum disorder and believed to be applicable to other disorders as well.

== Theoretical model ==
According to inference-based therapy, obsessional doubt (obsessions) result from a narrative constituted by a specific inductive-reasoning style characterized by a distrust of the senses and an overinvestment in remote possibilities. Individuals become absorbed in an imagined possibility forming the obsessional doubt ("perhaps my hands are dirty") at the expense of what can be perceived with the senses in the here and now ("my eyes tell me that hands are clean"). The imagined possibility seems so credible that individuals live this possibility as if it were true, and experience physiological reactions, feelings of anxiety, and compulsions that are congruent with the imagined scenario and become immersed in the obsessional doubt. According to inference-based therapy, individuals are more prone to experience specific obsessions in some and not other areas because the content reflects an underlying vulnerable self-theme (e.g., "I might be the type of person who is neglectful").

== Treatment ==
The goal of inference-based therapy is to reorient clients towards trusting the senses and relating to reality in a normal, non-effortful way. Differences between normal and obsessional doubts are presented, and clients are encouraged to use their senses and reasoning as they do in non-obsessive–compulsive disorder situations. The exact moment where clients cross over from reality to a possibility is identified, and clients are invited to go back to reality, use their senses, and tolerate the void of trusting the senses rather than enacting compulsive behaviors. The key premise is that if the client trusts themselves and their senses, then OCD cannot exist. Inference-based therapy is traditionally composed of twelve modules with each module teaching the client a different concept or skill, which they can then apply to their own experiences with OCD.

== Empirical support ==
There is some empirical support for main premises of inference-based therapy regarding the role of inductive reasoning processes, the imagination, and inferential confusion. There is also evidence for the efficacy of inference-based therapy for obsessive–compulsive disorder.
