= Obsessive–compulsive disorder =

Mental disorder

- The four components of the OCD cycle
- Specialty: Psychiatry, clinical psychology
- Symptoms: Feel the need to perform certain behaviors repeatedly, have certain distressing thoughts repeatedly
- Complications: Tics, anxiety disorder, suicide
- Usual onset: Before 35 years
- Risk factors: Family history, neurobiology, temperament, childhood trauma, certain drugs and medications
- Diagnostic method: Clinically based on symptoms; Y-BOCS is the gold standard tool to assess severity
- Differential diagnosis: Anxiety disorder, major depressive disorder, eating disorders, tic disorders, obsessive–compulsive personality disorder
- Treatment: Cognitive behavioral therapy, medication, transcranial magnetic stimulation, surgery
- Medication: Selective serotonin reuptake inhibitors (SSRIs), clomipramine, adjunctive atypical antipsychotics
- Frequency: 2.3%

Obsessive–compulsive disorder (OCD) is a mental disorder in which an individual has intrusive thoughts (an obsession) and feels the need to perform certain behaviors (compulsions) repeatedly to relieve the distress caused by the obsession, to the extent where it impairs general function. OCD has been described since antiquity and has affected numerous notable historical and contemporary figures; understandings of it were historically rooted in religious beliefs.

Obsessions are persistent unwanted thoughts, mental images, or urges that generate feelings of anxiety, disgust, or discomfort. Some common obsessions include fear of contamination, obsession with symmetry, the fear of acting blasphemously, sexual obsessions, and the fear of possibly harming others or themselves. Compulsions are repetitive actions performed in response to obsessions to reduce anxiety, such as washing, checking, counting, reassurance seeking, and situational avoidance.

Compulsions occur often and typically take up at least one hour per day, impairing one's quality of life. Compulsions temporarily relieve distress but reinforce obsessions over time. Many adults with OCD recognize their rituals as irrational yet continue them to reduce anxiety. For this reason, thoughts and behaviors in OCD are usually considered egodystonic (inconsistent with one's ideal self-image).

The causes of OCD are multifactorial and not fully understood, involving genetic predisposition, environmental stressors such as childhood trauma, abnormalities in brain structure and neurotransmitter function, certain medications or drugs, potential autoimmune processes in some children, and possibly evolutionary factors influencing compulsive behaviors. Diagnosis is based on clinical presentation; rating scales such as the Yale–Brown Obsessive–Compulsive Scale (Y-BOCS) assess severity. OCD involves abnormalities in cortico-striato-thalamo-cortical circuits and dysregulation of serotonin, dopamine, and glutamate. OCD is associated with a general increase in suicidality. The term obsessive–compulsive or OCD is often used informally to describe someone overly meticulous or fixated, but OCD can present in many ways, and not all sufferers focus on cleanliness or symmetry.

OCD is chronic and long-lasting with periods of severe symptoms followed by periods of improvement. Treatment can improve ability to function and quality of life, and is usually reflected by improved Y-BOCS scores. First-line treatment for OCD typically consists of either exposure and response prevention or pharmacotherapy with selective serotonin reuptake inhibitors (SSRIs), or both in combination. Some patients fail to improve after treatment with SSRIs alone; these cases qualify as treatment-resistant and can require second-line treatment such as clomipramine or augmentation with an atypical antipsychotic. Treatment-resistant obsessive–compulsive disorder is also managed with transcranial magnetic stimulation or, as a last resort, surgical options like deep brain stimulation.

== Signs and symptoms ==
OCD can present with a wide variety of symptoms. Certain groups of symptoms usually occur together as dimensions or clusters, which may reflect an underlying process. The standard assessment tool for OCD, the Yale–Brown Obsessive–Compulsive Scale (Y-BOCS), has 13 predefined categories of symptoms. These symptoms fit into three to five groupings. A meta-analytic review of symptom structures found a four-factor grouping structure to be most reliable: symmetry factor, forbidden thoughts factor, cleaning factor and hoarding factor. The symmetry factor correlates highly with obsessions related to ordering, counting and symmetry, as well as repeating compulsions. The forbidden thoughts factor correlates highly with intrusive thoughts of a violent, religious, or sexual nature. The cleaning factor correlates highly with obsessions about contamination and compulsions related to cleaning. The hoarding factor only involves hoarding-related obsessions and compulsions, and was identified as being distinct from other symptom groupings.

When examining the onset of OCD, one study suggests that there are differences in the age of onset between males and females, with the average age of onset of OCD being 9.6 years for boys and 11.0 years for girls. Children with OCD often have other mental disorders, such as ADHD, depression, anxiety, and disruptive behavior disorder. Continually, children are more likely to struggle in school and experience difficulties in social situations. When looking at both adults and children, a study found the average ages of onset to be 21 and 24 for males and females respectively. While some studies have shown that OCD with earlier onset is associated with greater severity, other studies have not been able to validate this finding. Looking at women specifically, a different study suggested that 62% of participants found that their symptoms worsened at a premenstrual age. Across the board, all demographics and studies showed a mean age of onset of less than 25.

Some OCD subtypes have been associated with improvement in performance on certain tasks, such as pattern recognition (washing subtype) and spatial working memory (obsessive thought subtype). Subgroups have also been distinguished by neuroimaging findings and treatment response, though neuroimaging studies have not been comprehensive enough to draw conclusions. Subtype-dependent treatment response has been studied and the hoarding subtype has consistently been least responsive to treatment.

While OCD is considered a homogeneous disorder from a neuropsychological perspective, many of the symptoms may be the result of comorbid disorders. For example, adults with OCD have exhibited more symptoms of attention deficit hyperactivity disorder (ADHD) and autism spectrum disorder (ASD) than adults without OCD.

=== Obsessions ===
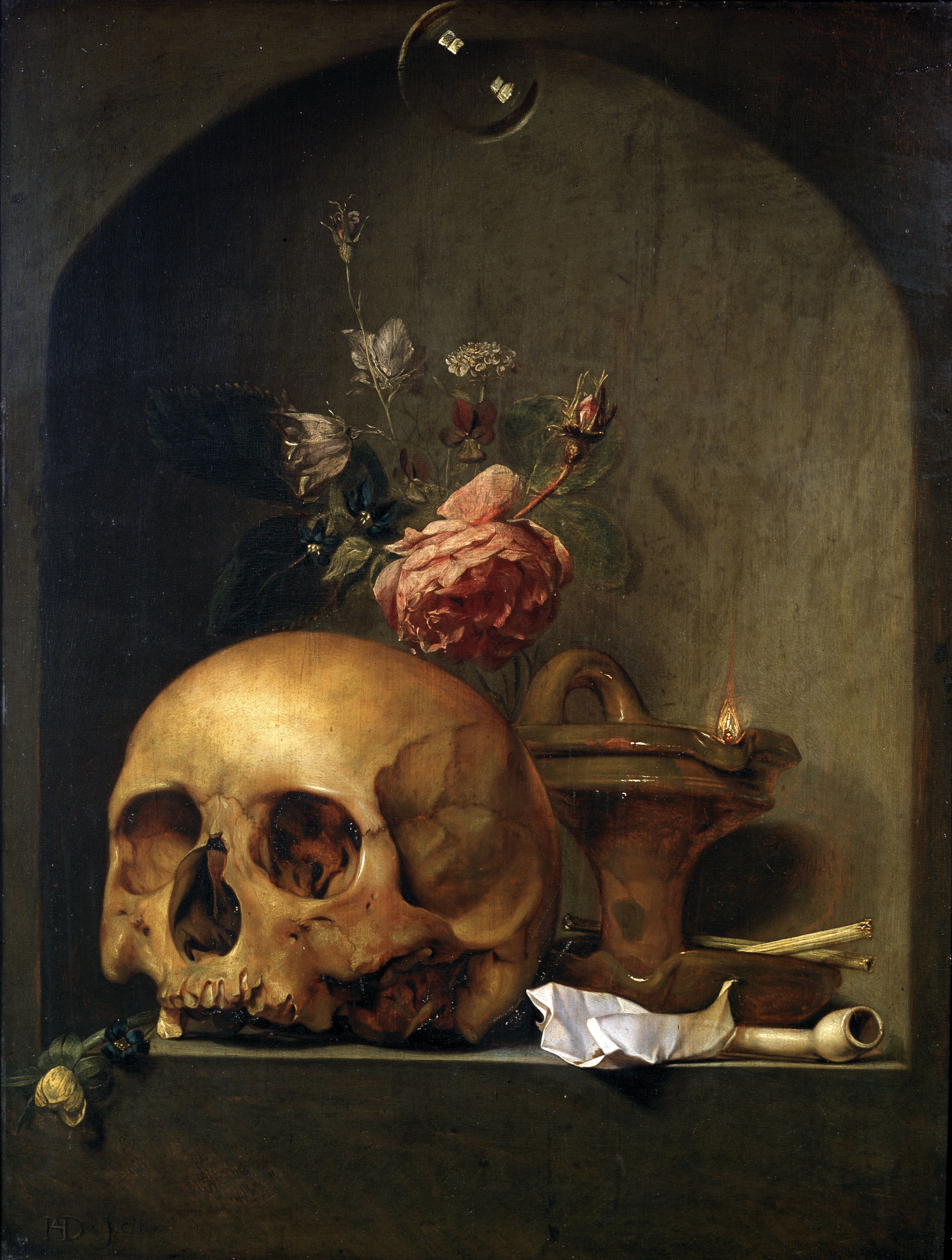
People with scrupulosity OCD may face intrusive thoughts such as worrying about death.

Obsessions are stress-inducing thoughts that recur and persist, despite efforts to ignore or confront them. People with OCD frequently perform tasks, or compulsions, to seek relief from obsession-related anxiety. Within and among individuals, initial obsessions vary in clarity and vividness. A relatively vague obsession could involve a general sense of disarray or tension, accompanied by a belief that life cannot proceed as normal while the imbalance remains. A more intense obsession could be a preoccupation with the thought or image of a close family member or friend dying, or intrusive thoughts related to relationship rightness. Other obsessions concern the possibility that someone or something other than oneself—such as God, the devil, or disease—will harm either the patient or the people or things the patient cares about. Others with OCD may experience the sensation of invisible protrusions emanating from their bodies or feel that inanimate objects are ensouled. Another common obsession is scrupulosity, the pathological guilt/anxiety about moral or religious issues. In scrupulosity, a person's obsessions focus on moral or religious fears, such as the fear of being an evil person or the fear of divine retribution for sin, for example going to Hell. Mysophobia, a pathological fear of contamination and germs, is another common obsession theme.

Some people with OCD experience sexual obsessions that may involve intrusive thoughts or images of various sexual acts with strangers, acquaintances, relatives, animals, or religious figures and can include heterosexual or homosexual contact with people of any age. Similar to other intrusive thoughts or images, some disquieting sexual thoughts are normal at times, but people with OCD may attach extraordinary significance to such thoughts. For example, obsessive fears about sexual orientation can appear to the affected individual, and even to those around them, as a crisis of sexual identity. Furthermore, the doubt that accompanies OCD leads to uncertainty regarding whether one might act on the troubling thoughts, resulting in self-criticism or self-loathing.

Pedophilia-themed obsessive–compulsive disorder (also known as pedophile OCD or P-OCD) is an OCD subtype regarding reocurring compulsions and obsessions over one being a pedophile.

Most people with OCD understand that their thoughts do not correspond with reality; however, they feel that they must act as though these ideas are correct or realistic. For example, someone who engages in compulsive hoarding might be inclined to treat inorganic matter as if it had the sentience or rights of living organisms, despite accepting that such behavior is irrational on an intellectual level. There is debate as to whether hoarding should be considered an independent syndrome from OCD.

=== Compulsions ===
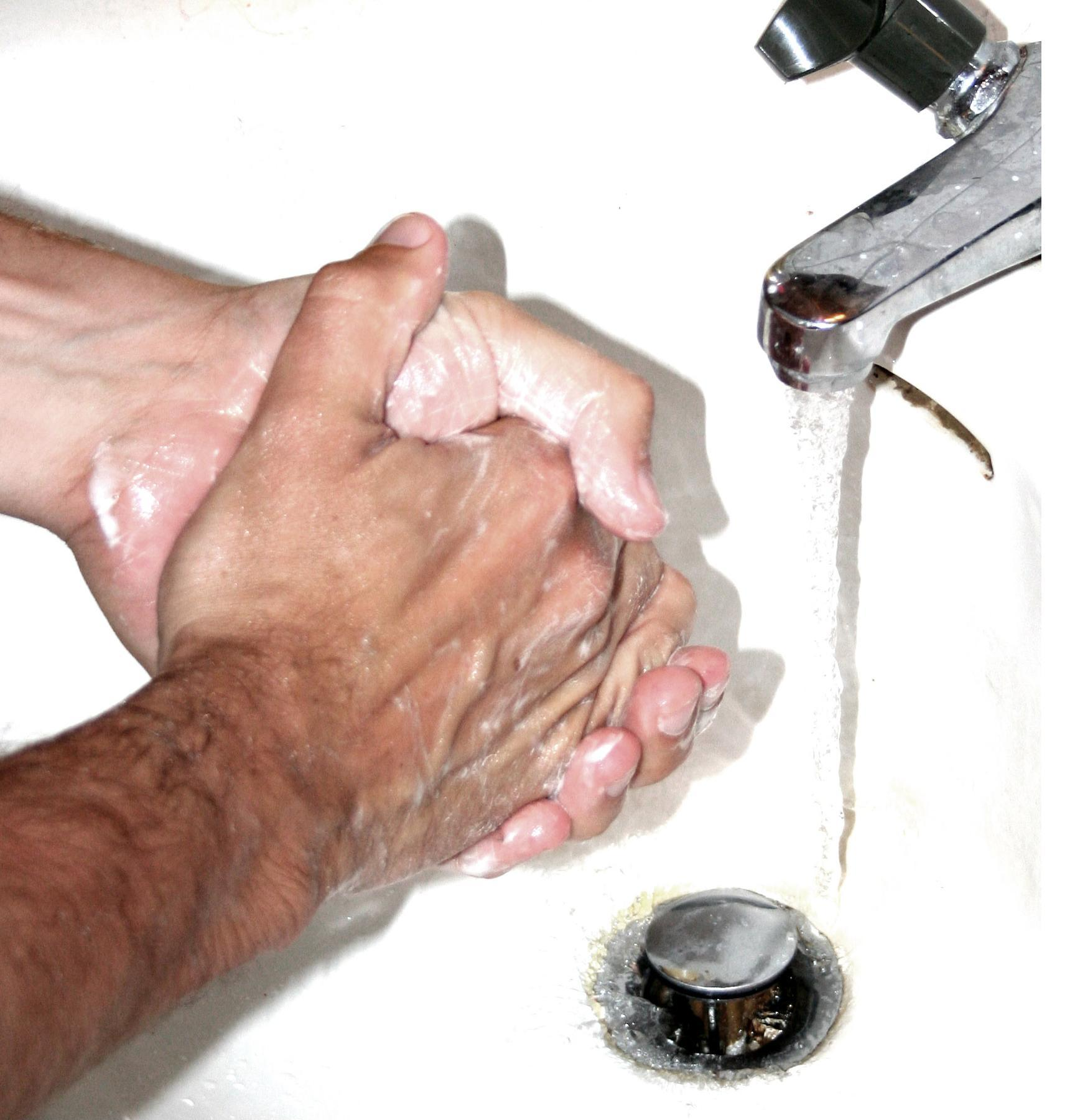
Obsessive hand washing is an example of a compulsive behavior.

Some people with OCD perform compulsive rituals because they inexplicably feel that they must do so, while others act compulsively to mitigate the anxiety that stems from obsessive thoughts. The affected individual might feel that these actions will either prevent a dreaded event from occurring or push the event from their thoughts. In any case, their reasoning is so idiosyncratic or distorted that it results in significant distress, either personally or for those around the affected individual. Excessive skin picking, hair pulling, nail biting and other body-focused repetitive behavior disorders are all on the obsessive–compulsive spectrum. Some individuals with OCD are aware that their behaviors are not rational, but they feel compelled to follow through with them to fend off feelings of panic or dread. Furthermore, compulsions often stem from memory distrust, a symptom of OCD characterized by insecurity in one's skills in perception, attention and memory, even in cases where there is no clear evidence of a deficit.

Common compulsions may include hand washing, cleaning, checking things (such as locks on doors), repeating actions (such as repeatedly turning on and off switches), ordering items in a certain way and requesting reassurance. Although some individuals perform actions repeatedly, they do not necessarily perform these actions compulsively; for example, morning or nighttime routines and religious practices are not usually compulsions. Whether behaviors qualify as compulsions or mere habit depends on the context in which they are performed. For instance, arranging and ordering books for eight hours a day would be expected of someone who works in a library, but this routine would seem abnormal in other situations. In other words, habits tend to bring efficiency to one's life, while compulsions tend to disrupt it. Furthermore, compulsions are different from tics (such as touching, tapping, rubbing or blinking) and stereotyped movements (such as head banging, body rocking or self-biting), which are usually not as complex and not precipitated by obsessions. It can sometimes be difficult to tell the difference between compulsions and complex tics, and about 10–40% of people with OCD also have a lifetime tic disorder.

People with OCD rely on compulsions as an escape from their obsessive thoughts; however, they are aware that relief is only temporary and that intrusive thoughts will return. Some affected individuals use compulsions to avoid situations that may trigger obsessions. Compulsions may be actions directly related to the obsession, such as someone obsessed with contamination compulsively washing their hands, but they can be unrelated as well. In addition to experiencing the anxiety and fear that typically accompanies OCD, affected individuals may spend hours performing compulsions every day. In such situations, it can become difficult for the person to fulfill their work, familial or social roles. These behaviors can also cause adverse physical symptoms; for example, people who obsessively wash their hands with antibacterial soap and hot water can make their skin red and raw with dermatitis.

Individuals with OCD often use rationalizations to explain their behavior; however, these rationalizations do not apply to the behavioral pattern, but to each individual occurrence. For example, someone compulsively checking the front door may argue that the time and stress associated with one check is less than the time and stress associated with being robbed, and checking is consequently the better option. This reasoning often occurs in a cyclical manner and can continue for as long as the affected person needs it to in order to feel safe.

OCD sometimes manifests in mental instead of overt compulsions. This manifestation may be termed "primarily obsessional OCD" and typically involves mental compulsions, such as mental avoidance or excessive rumination. OCD without overt compulsions could, by one estimate, characterize as many as 50–60% of OCD cases.

=== Insight and overvalued ideation ===
The DSM-5 identifies a continuum for the level of insight in OCD, ranging from good insight (the least severe) to no insight (the most severe). Good or fair insight is characterized by the acknowledgment that obsessive–compulsive beliefs are not or may not be true, while poor insight is characterized by the belief that obsessive–compulsive beliefs are probably true. The absence of insight altogether, in which the individual is completely convinced that their beliefs are true, is also identified as a delusional thought pattern and occurs in about 4% of people with OCD. When cases of OCD with no insight become severe, affected individuals have an unshakable belief in the reality of their delusions, which can make their cases difficult to differentiate from psychotic disorders. Additionally, good insight can include cases where the individual has no insight during the experience but demonstrates insight later, when they are in a calmer state of mind.

Some people with OCD exhibit what is known as overvalued ideas, ideas that are abnormal compared to affected individuals' respective cultures, and more treatment-resistant than most negative thoughts and obsessions. After some discussion, it is possible to convince the individual that their fears are unfounded. It may be more difficult to practice exposure and response prevention therapy (ERP) on such people, as they may be unwilling to cooperate, at least initially. Similar to how insight is identified on a continuum, obsessive–compulsive beliefs are characterized on a spectrum, ranging from obsessive doubt to delusional conviction. In the United States, overvalued ideation (OVI) is considered most akin to poor insight—especially when considering belief strength as one of an idea's key identifiers. Furthermore, severe and frequent overvalued ideas are considered similar to idealized values, which are so rigidly held by, and so important to affected individuals, that they end up becoming a defining identity. In adolescent OCD patients, OVI is considered a severe symptom.

Historically, OVI has been thought to be linked to poorer treatment outcome in patients with OCD, but it is currently considered a poor indicator of prognosis. The Overvalued Ideas Scale (OVIS) has been developed as a reliable quantitative method of measuring levels of OVI in patients with OCD. Research has suggested that overvalued ideas are more stable for those with more extreme OVIS scores.

=== Cognitive performance ===
Though OCD was once believed to be associated with above-average intelligence, this does not appear to necessarily be the case. A 2013 review reported that people with OCD may sometimes have mild but wide-ranging cognitive deficits, most significantly those affecting spatial memory and to a lesser extent with verbal memory, fluency, executive function and processing speed, while auditory attention was not significantly affected. People with OCD show impairment in formulating an organizational strategy for coding information, set-shifting, and motor and cognitive inhibition.

Specific subtypes of symptom dimensions in OCD have been associated with specific cognitive deficits. For example, the results of one meta-analysis comparing washing and checking symptoms reported that washers outperformed checkers on eight out of ten cognitive tests. The symptom dimension of contamination and cleaning may be associated with higher scores on tests of inhibition and verbal memory.

=== Pediatric OCD ===
Approximately 1–2% of children are affected by OCD. An international study showed that OCD most often develops during childhood or adolescence, with 21% of subjects having developed symptoms during childhood (age 12 and under) and another 36% having developed symptoms during adolescence (ages 13–17). OCD diagnosis in children occurs at similar rates across different ethnic groups and races, but African American children are less likely to receive treatment. The clinical presentation of OCD in children shares many similarities with that observed in adults. OCD is considered a highly familial disorder, with a phenotypic heritability of around 50%. Symptoms tend to develop more frequently in children 10–14 years of age, with males displaying symptoms at an earlier age, and at a more severe level than females. In children, symptoms can be grouped into at least four types, including sporadic and tic-related OCD.

The Children's Yale–Brown Obsessive–Compulsive Scale (CY-BOCS) is the gold standard measure for assessment of pediatric OCD. It follows the Y-BOCS format, but with a Symptom Checklist that is adapted for developmental appropriateness. Insight, avoidance, indecisiveness, responsibility, pervasive slowness and doubting are not included in a rating of overall severity. The CY-BOCS has demonstrated good convergent validity with clinician-rated OCD severity and good to fair discriminant validity from measures of closely related anxiety, depression and tic severity. The CY-BOCS Total Severity score is an important monitoring tool as it is responsive to pharmacotherapy and psychotherapy. Positive treatment response is characterized by 25% reduction in CY-BOCS total score and diagnostic remission is associated with a 45%–50% reduction in Total Severity score (or a score <15). The Child Behavior Checklist-Obsessive Compulsive Subscale (CBCL-OCS) appears to demonstrate sufficient accuracy in identifying children and adolescents who may require additional evaluation for OCD.

The Children's Florida Obsessive Compulsive Inventory (C-FOCI) utilizes 17 specific, brief questions which focus on compulsions or obsessions frequent among younger individuals with OCD. These act as a dichotomous tool to evaluate whether obsessions and compulsions are present or absent, using a symptom checklist on a scale of 0 to 17, and a severity scale of 0 to 85.

Cognitive behavioral therapy (CBT) is the first line treatment for mild to moderate cases of OCD in children, while medication plus CBT is recommended for moderate to severe cases. Selective serotonin reuptake inhibitors (SSRIs) are first-line medications for OCD in children with established AACAP guidelines for dosing. Medication in addition to a CBT intervention like exposure and response prevention (ERP) is more beneficial than only using medication in the treatment of OCD in children.

=== Associated conditions ===
People with OCD may be diagnosed with other conditions as well, such as obsessive–compulsive personality disorder, major depressive disorder, bipolar disorder, generalized anxiety disorder, anorexia nervosa, social anxiety disorder, bulimia nervosa, Tourette syndrome, transformation obsession, ASD, ADHD, dermatillomania, body dysmorphic disorder and trichotillomania. More than 50% of people with OCD experience suicidal tendencies and 15% have attempted suicide. Depression, anxiety and prior suicide attempts increase the risk of future suicide attempts.

It has been found that between 18 and 34% of females currently experiencing OCD scored positively on an inventory measuring disordered eating. Another study found that 7% are likely to have an eating disorder, while another found that fewer than 5% of males have OCD and an eating disorder.

Individuals with OCD have also been found to be affected by delayed sleep phase disorder at a substantially higher rate than the general public. Moreover, severe OCD symptoms are consistently associated with greater sleep disturbance. Reduced total sleep time and sleep efficiency have been observed in people with OCD, with delayed sleep onset and offset.

Some research has demonstrated a link between drug addiction and OCD. For example, there is a higher risk of drug addiction among those with any anxiety disorder, likely as a way of coping with the heightened levels of anxiety. However, drug addiction among people with OCD may be a compulsive behavior. Depression is also extremely prevalent among people with OCD. One explanation for the high depression rate among OCD populations was posited by Mineka, Watson and Clark (1998), who explained that people with OCD, or any other anxiety disorder, may feel "out of control".

Someone exhibiting OCD-like signs does not necessarily have OCD. Behaviors that present as obsessive–compulsive can also be found in a number of other conditions, including obsessive–compulsive personality disorder (OCPD), autism spectrum disorder (ASD) or disorders in which perseveration is a possible feature (ADHD, PTSD, bodily disorders or stereotyped behaviors). Some cases of OCD present symptoms typically associated with Tourette syndrome, such as compulsions that may appear to resemble motor tics; this has been termed tic-related OCD or Tourettic OCD.

OCD frequently occurs comorbidly with both bipolar disorder and major depressive disorder. Between 60 and 80% of those with OCD experience a major depressive episode in their lifetime. Comorbidity rates have been reported at between 19 and 90%, as a result of methodological differences. Between 9–35% of those with bipolar disorder also have OCD, compared to 1–2% in the general population. About 50% of those with OCD experience cyclothymic traits or hypomanic episodes. OCD is also associated with anxiety disorders. Lifetime comorbidity for OCD has been reported at 22% for specific phobia, 18% for social anxiety disorder, 12% for panic disorder and 30% for generalized anxiety disorder. The comorbidity rate for OCD and ADHD has been reported to be as high as 51%.

== Causes ==
The cause of OCD is not fully understood. Both environmental and genetic factors are believed to play a role. Risk factors include a history of adverse childhood experiences or other stress-inducing events.

=== Drug-induced OCD ===
Some medications, toxin exposures and drugs, such as methamphetamine or cocaine, can induce obsessive–compulsive symptoms in people without a history of OCD. Atypical antipsychotics such as olanzapine and clozapine can induce OCD in some people, particularly individuals with schizophrenia.

The diagnostic criteria include:

1. General OCD symptoms (obsessions, compulsions, skin picking, hair pulling, etc.) that developed soon after exposure to the substance or medication which can produce such symptoms.
2. The onset of symptoms cannot be explained by an obsessive–compulsive and related disorder that is not substance/medication-induced and should last for a substantial period of time (about 1 month)
3. This disturbance does not exclusively occur during delirium.
4. Clinically induces distress or impairment in social, occupational or other important areas of functioning.

=== Genetics ===
There appear to be some genetic components of OCD causation, with identical twins more often affected than fraternal twins. Furthermore, individuals with OCD are more likely to have first-degree family members exhibiting the same disorders than matched controls. In cases in which OCD develops during childhood, there is a much stronger familial link in the disorder than with cases in which OCD develops later in adulthood. OCD is highly familial, with heritability estimated at about 50%. OCD is believed to be a heterogeneous disorder.

A genome-wide association study of OCD identified 30 significant genetic loci and 25 likely causal genes, including WDR6, DALRD3, and CTNND1, with ~11,500 variants explaining most of its heritability. Genetic risk is linked to excitatory neurons in the hippocampus and cerebral cortex, D1 and D2 medium spiny neurons, and overlaps with anxiety, depression, anorexia nervosa, and Tourette syndrome.

Research has found there to be a genetic correlation between anorexia nervosa and OCD, suggesting a strong etiology. First- and second-hand relatives of probands with OCD have a greater risk of developing anorexia nervosa as genetic relatedness increases.

A mutation has been found in the human serotonin transporter gene hSERT in unrelated families with OCD.

A systematic review found that while neither allele was associated with OCD overall, in Caucasians, the L allele was associated with OCD. Another meta-analysis observed an increased risk in those with the homozygous S allele, but found the LS genotype to be inversely associated with OCD.

A genome-wide association study found OCD to be linked with single-nucleotide polymorphisms (SNPs) near BTBD3 and two SNPs in DLGAP1 in a trio-based analysis, but no SNP reached significance when analyzed with case-control data.

One meta-analysis found a small but significant association between a polymorphism in SLC1A1 and OCD.

The relationship between OCD and catechol-O-methyltransferase (COMT) has been inconsistent, with one meta-analysis reporting a significant association, albeit only in men, and another meta analysis reporting no association.

It has been postulated by evolutionary psychologists that moderate versions of compulsive behavior may have had evolutionary advantages. Examples would be moderate constant checking of hygiene, the hearth or the environment for enemies. Similarly, hoarding may have had evolutionary advantages. In this view, OCD may be the extreme statistical tail of such behaviors, possibly the result of a high number of predisposing genes.

=== Brain structure and functioning ===
Imaging studies have shown differences in the frontal cortex and subcortical structures of the brain in patients with OCD. There appears to be a connection between the OCD symptoms and abnormalities in certain areas of the brain, but such a connection is not clear. Some people with OCD have areas of unusually high activity in their brain or low levels of the chemical serotonin, which is a neurotransmitter that some nerve cells use to communicate with each other, and is thought to be involved in regulating many functions, influencing emotions, mood, memory, and sleep.

=== Autoimmune ===
A controversial hypothesis is that some cases of rapid onset of OCD in children and adolescents may be caused by a syndrome connected to group A streptococcal infections (GABHS), known as pediatric autoimmune neuropsychiatric disorders associated with streptococcal infections (PANDAS). OCD and tic disorders are hypothesized to arise in a subset of children as a result of a post-streptococcal autoimmune process. The PANDAS hypothesis remains unconfirmed is currently unsupported by sufficient data and two new categories have been proposed: PANS (pediatric acute-onset neuropsychiatric syndrome) and CANS (childhood acute neuropsychiatric syndrome). The CANS and PANS hypotheses include different possible mechanisms underlying acute-onset neuropsychiatric conditions, but do not exclude GABHS infections as a cause in a subset of individuals. PANDAS, PANS, and CANS are the focus of clinical and laboratory research, but remain unproven. Whether PANDAS is a distinct entity differing from other cases of tic disorders or OCD is debated.

A review of studies examining anti-basal ganglia antibodies in OCD found an increased risk of having anti-basal ganglia antibodies in those with OCD versus the general population.

=== Environment ===
OCD may be more common in people who have been bullied, abused or neglected, and it sometimes starts after a significant life event, such as childbirth or bereavement. It has been reported in some studies that there is a connection between childhood trauma and obsessive–compulsive symptoms. More research is needed to understand this relationship better.

== Mechanisms ==
=== Neuroimaging ===
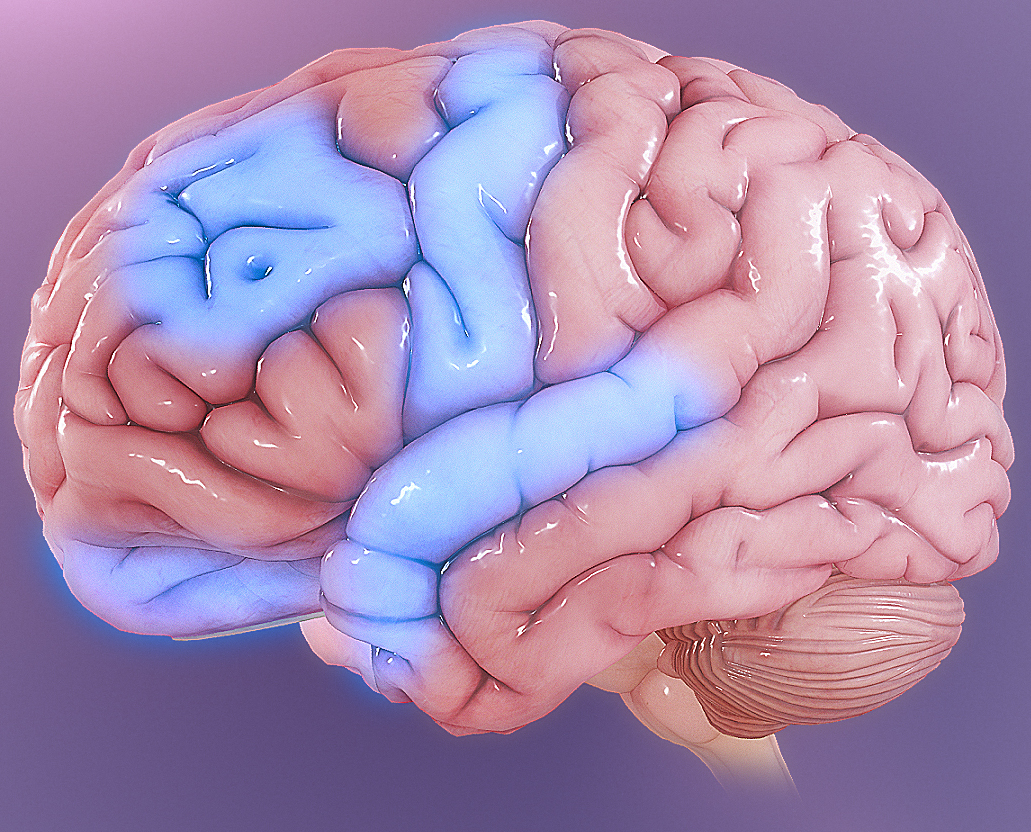
Some parts of the brain showing abnormal activity in OCD: Orbitofrontal cortex integrates rewards, emotions, and behaviors; anterior cingulate cortex is involved in error detection; amygdala is involved in emotional interpretation of reward

Functional neuroimaging during symptom provocation has observed abnormal activity in the orbitofrontal cortex (OFC), left dorsolateral prefrontal cortex (dlPFC), right premotor cortex, left superior temporal gyrus, globus pallidus externus, hippocampus and right uncus. Weaker foci of abnormal activity were found in the left caudate, posterior cingulate cortex and superior parietal lobule. However, an older meta-analysis of functional neuroimaging in OCD reported that the only consistent functional neuroimaging finding was increased activity in the orbital gyrus and head of the caudate nucleus, while anterior cingulate cortex (ACC) activation abnormalities were too inconsistent.

A meta-analysis comparing affective and nonaffective tasks observed differences with controls in regions implicated in salience, habit, goal-directed behavior, self-referential thinking and cognitive control. For nonaffective tasks, hyperactivity was observed in the insula, ACC and head of the caudate/putamen, while hypoactivity was observed in the medial prefrontal cortex (mPFC) and posterior caudate. Affective tasks were observed to relate to increased activation in the precuneus and posterior cingulate cortex, while decreased activation was found in the pallidum, ventral anterior thalamus and posterior caudate. The involvement of the cortico-striato-thalamo-cortical loop in OCD, as well as the high rates of comorbidity between OCD and ADHD, have led some to draw a link in their mechanism. Observed similarities include dysfunction of the anterior cingulate cortex and prefrontal cortex, as well as shared deficits in executive functions. The involvement of the orbitofrontal cortex and dorsolateral prefrontal cortex in OCD is shared with bipolar disorder and may explain the high degree of comorbidity. Decreased volumes of the dorsolateral prefrontal cortex related to executive function has also been observed in OCD.

People with OCD show increased grey matter volumes in bilateral lenticular nuclei, extending to the caudate nuclei, with decreased grey matter volumes in bilateral dorsal medial frontal/anterior cingulate gyri. These findings contrast with those in people with other anxiety disorders, who evince decreased (rather than increased) grey matter volumes in bilateral lenticular/caudate nuclei, as well as decreased grey matter volumes in bilateral dorsal medial frontal/anterior cingulate gyri. Increased white matter volume and decreased fractional anisotropy in anterior midline tracts has been observed in OCD, possibly indicating increased fiber crossings.

=== Cognitive models ===
Generally, two categories of models for OCD have been postulated. The first category involves deficits in executive dysfunction and is based on the observed structural and functional abnormalities in the dlPFC, striatum and thalamus. The second category involves dysfunctional modulatory control and primarily relies on observed functional and structural differences in the ACC, mPFC and OFC.

One proposed model suggests that dysfunction in the orbitofrontal cortex (OFC) leads to improper valuation of behaviors and decreased behavioral control, while the observed alterations in amygdala activations leads to exaggerated fears and representations of negative stimuli.

Due to the heterogeneity of OCD symptoms, studies differentiating various symptoms have been performed. Symptom-specific neuroimaging abnormalities include the hyperactivity of caudate and ACC in checking rituals, while finding increased activity of cortical and cerebellar regions in contamination-related symptoms. Neuroimaging differentiating content of intrusive thoughts has found differences between aggressive as opposed to taboo thoughts, finding increased connectivity of the amygdala, ventral striatum and ventromedial prefrontal cortex in aggressive symptoms, while observing increased connectivity between the ventral striatum and insula in sexual or religious intrusive thoughts.

Another model proposes that affective dysregulation links excessive reliance on habit-based action selection with compulsions. This is supported by the observation that those with OCD demonstrate decreased activation of the ventral striatum when anticipating monetary reward, as well as increased functional connectivity between the VS and the OFC. Furthermore, those with OCD demonstrate reduced performance in Pavlovian fear-extinction tasks, hyperresponsiveness in the amygdala to fearful stimuli and hyporesponsiveness in the amygdala when exposed to positively valanced stimuli. Stimulation of the nucleus accumbens has also been observed to effectively alleviate both obsessions and compulsions, supporting the role of affective dysregulation in generating both.

=== Neurobiological ===
From the observation of the efficacy of antidepressants in OCD, a serotonin hypothesis of OCD has been formulated. Studies of peripheral markers of serotonin, as well as challenges with proserotonergic compounds have yielded inconsistent results, including evidence pointing towards basal hyperactivity of serotonergic systems. Serotonin receptor and transporter binding studies have yielded conflicting results, including higher and lower serotonin receptor 5-HT_{2A} and serotonin transporter binding potentials that were normalized by treatment with SSRIs. Despite inconsistencies in the types of abnormalities found, evidence points towards dysfunction of serotonergic systems in OCD. Orbitofrontal cortex overactivity is attenuated in people who have successfully responded to SSRI medication, a result believed to be caused by increased stimulation of serotonin receptors 5-HT_{2A} and 5-HT_{2C}.

Dopaminergic dysfunction in cortico-striato-thalamo-cortical circuits has been implicated in cognitive rigidity, emotional dysregulation, and compulsive behaviors in OCD. A 2020 review found striatal D_{2} receptors are decreased in OCD, dopamine transporters are unchanged in OCD, and evidence for other dopaminergic changes is limited. Increased dopamine release in the nucleus accumbens after deep brain stimulation correlates with improvement in symptoms, pointing to reduced dopamine release in the striatum playing a role in generating symptoms.

OCD has been associates with reduced N-acetylaspartic acid in the mPFC. Findings such as increased cerebrospinal glutamate and inconsistently observed neuroimaging abnormalities, and the efficacy of some glutamatergic drugs (such as the glutamate-inhibiting riluzole) have implicated glutamate in OCD. Recent neurobiological models view OCD as arising from interactions among genetic risk factors, cortico-striato-thalamocortical circuits, and multiple neurotransmitter systems including serotonin, dopamine, and glutamate instead of dysfunction in a single pathway. OCD has been associated with reduced N-acetylaspartic acid in the mPFC, which is thought to reflect neuron density or functionality, although the exact interpretation has not been established.

== Diagnosis ==
Formal diagnosis may be performed by a psychologist, psychiatrist, clinical social worker or other licensed mental health professional. OCD, like other mental and behavioral health disorders, cannot be diagnosed by a medical exam, nor are there any medical exams that can predict if one will fall victim to such illnesses. To be diagnosed with OCD, a person must have obsessions, compulsions or both, according to the Diagnostic and Statistical Manual of Mental Disorders (DSM). The DSM notes that there are multiple characteristics that can turn obsessions and compulsions from normalized behavior to "clinically significant". There must be recurring and strong thoughts or impulses that intrude on the day-to-day lives of the patients and cause noticeable levels of anxiousness.

These thoughts, impulses or images are of a degree or type that lies outside the normal range of worries about conventional problems. A person may attempt to ignore or suppress such obsessions, neutralize them with another thought or action, or try to rationalize their anxiety away. People with OCD tend to recognize their obsessions as irrational.

Compulsions become clinically significant when a person feels compelled to perform them in response to an obsession or according to rules that must be applied rigidly and when the person consequently feels or causes significant distress. Therefore, while many people who do not have OCD may perform actions often associated with OCD (such as ordering items in a pantry by height), the distinction with clinically significant OCD lies in the fact that the person with OCD must perform these actions to avoid significant psychological distress. These behaviors or mental acts are aimed at preventing or reducing distress or preventing some dreaded event or situation; however, these activities are not logically or practically connected to the issue or they are excessive.

Moreover, the obsessions or compulsions must be time-consuming, often taking up more than one hour per day or cause impairment in social, occupational or scholastic functioning. It is helpful to quantify the severity of symptoms and impairment before and during treatment for OCD. In addition to the person's estimate of the time spent each day harboring obsessive-compulsive thoughts or behaviors, concrete tools can be used to gauge the person's condition. This may be done with rating scales, such as the Yale–Brown Obsessive–Compulsive Scale (Y-BOCS; expert rating) or the obsessive–compulsive inventory (OCI-R; self-rating). A 2025 systematic review found that the 8-question Child Behavior Checklist–Obsessive-Compulsive Subscale (CBCL-OCD/OCS) demonstrates moderate accuracy in identifying children likely to have OCD and may help guide referrals for specialist evaluation. With measurements such as these, psychiatric consultation can be more appropriately determined, as it has been standardized.

In regards to diagnosing, the health professional also looks to make sure that the signs of obsessions and compulsions are not the results of any drugs, prescription or recreational, that the patient may be taking.

There are several types of obsessive thoughts that are found commonly in those with OCD. Some of these include fear of germs, hurting loved ones, embarrassment, neatness, societally unacceptable sexual thoughts etc. Within OCD, these specific categories are often diagnosed into their own type of OCD. OCD is sometimes placed in a group of disorders called the obsessive–compulsive spectrum.

Another criterion in the DSM is that a person's mental illness does not fit one of the other categories of a mental disorder better. That is to say, if the obsessions and compulsions of a patient could be better described by trichotillomania, it would not be diagnosed as OCD. That being said, OCD does often go hand in hand with other mental disorders. For this reason, one may be diagnosed with multiple mental disorders at once.

A different aspect of the diagnoses is the degree of insight had by the individual in regards to the truth of the obsessions. There are three levels, good/fair, poor and absent/delusional. Good/fair indicated that the patient is aware that the obsessions they have are not true or probably not true. Poor indicates that the patient believes their obsessional beliefs are probably true. Absent/delusional indicates that they fully believe their obsessional thoughts to be true. Approximately 4% or fewer individuals with OCD will be diagnosed as absent/delusional. Additionally, as many as 30% of those with OCD also have a lifetime tic disorder, meaning they have been diagnosed with a tic disorder at some point in their life. There are several different types of tics that have been observed in individuals with OCD. These include but are not limited to, "grunting", "jerking" or "shrugging" body parts, sniffling and excessive blinking.

There has been a significant amount of progress over the last few decades and, as of 2022, there is statically significant improvement in the diagnostic process for individuals with OCD. One study found that of two groups of individuals, one with participants under the age of 27.25 and one with participants over that age, those in the younger group experienced a significantly faster time between the onset of OCD tendencies and their formal diagnoses.

=== Differential diagnosis ===
OCD is often confused with the separate condition obsessive–compulsive personality disorder (OCPD). OCD is egodystonic, meaning the disorder is experienced as inconsistent with the individual's self-concept. As egodystonic disorders go against a person's self-concept, they tend to cause much distress. OCPD, on the other hand, is egosyntonic, marked by the person's acceptance that the characteristics and behaviors displayed as a result are compatible with their self-image, or are otherwise appropriate, correct or reasonable.

As a result, people with OCD are often aware that their behavior is not rational and are unhappy about their obsessions, but nevertheless feel compelled by them. By contrast, people with OCPD are not aware of anything abnormal; they will readily explain why their actions are rational. It is usually impossible to convince them otherwise and they tend to derive pleasure from their obsessions or compulsions.

== Management ==
Cognitive behavioral therapy (CBT) and psychotropic medications are the first-line treatments for OCD.

=== Therapy ===
In cognitive behavioral therapy, OCD patients are asked to overcome intrusive thoughts by not indulging in any compulsions. They are taught that rituals keep OCD strong, while not performing them causes OCD to become weaker. This position is supported by the pattern of memory distrust; the more often compulsions are repeated, the more weakened memory trust becomes and this cycle continues as memory distrust increases compulsion frequency.

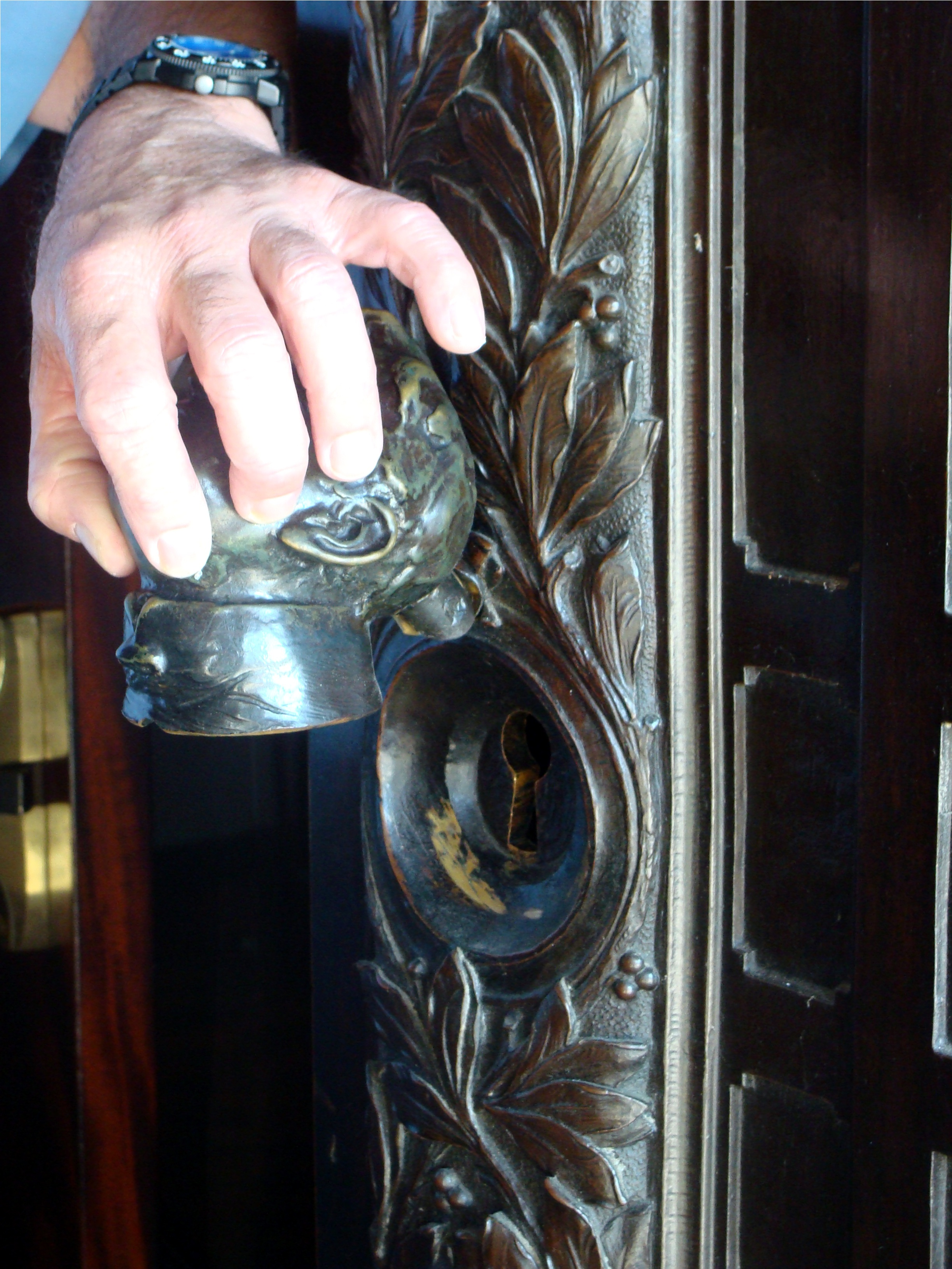
One exposure and ritual prevention activity would be to check the lock only once and then leave.

One specific CBT technique used is called exposure and response prevention (ERP), which involves teaching the person to deliberately come into contact with situations that trigger obsessive thoughts and fears (exposure), without carrying out the usual compulsive acts associated with the obsession (response prevention). This technique causes patients to gradually learn to tolerate the discomfort and anxiety associated with not performing their compulsions. For many patients, ERP is the add-on treatment of choice when selective serotonin reuptake inhibitors (SSRIs) medication does not effectively treat OCD symptoms, or vice versa, for individuals who begin treatment with psychotherapy. ERP is considered superior to some other approaches because it does not rely on medication. However, up to 25% of patients discontinue treatment due to symptom severity. CBT normally lasts anywhere from 12–16 sessions, with homework assigned to the patient in between meetings with a therapist. Modalities differ in ERP treatment but both virtual reality based as well as unguided computer assisted treatment programs have shown effective results in treatment programs. A 2024 systematic review concluded, with high strength of evidence, that CBT with ERP provided via telehealth is equally as effective for reducing symptoms, in children and adolescents, as in-person treatment.

After succeeding at one stage of treatment, the patient's level of discomfort in the exposure phase can be increased. When this therapy is successful, the patient will quickly habituate to an anxiety-producing situation, discovering a considerable drop in anxiety level.

ERP has a strong evidence base and is considered the most effective treatment for OCD. However, this claim was doubted by some researchers in 2000, who criticized the quality of many studies. While ERP can lead a majority of clients to improvements, many do not reach remission or become asymptomatic; some therapists are also hesitant to use this approach.

Telehealth and digital cognitive behavioral therapy interventions have shown effectiveness comparing with in person treatment in some studies.

Acceptance and commitment therapy (ACT), a newer therapy also used to treat anxiety and depression, has also been found to be effective in treatment of OCD. ACT uses acceptance and mindfulness strategies to teach patients not to overreact to or avoid unpleasant thoughts and feelings but rather "move toward valued behavior".

Inference-based therapy (IBT) is a form of cognitive therapy specifically developed for treating OCD. The therapy posits that individuals with OCD put a greater emphasis on an imagined possibility than on what can be perceived with the senses, and confuse the imagined possibility with reality, in a process called inferential confusion. According to inference-based therapy, obsessional thinking occurs when the person replaces reality and real probabilities with imagined possibilities. The goal of inference-based therapy is to reorient clients towards trusting the senses and relating to reality in a normal, non-effortful way. Differences between normal and obsessional doubts are explained and clients are encouraged to use their senses and reasoning as they do in non-obsessive–compulsive disorder situations. Research on Inference-Based Cognitive-Behavior Therapy (I-CBT) suggests it can lead to improvements for those with OCD.

For body-focused repetitive behaviors such as trichotillomania (hair pulling), skin picking, and onychophagia (nail biting), behavioral interventions such as habit reversal training and decoupling are recommended for the treatment of compulsive behaviors.

A 2007 Cochrane review found that psychological interventions derived from CBT models, such as ERP, ACT and IBT, were more effective than non-CBT interventions. Other forms of psychotherapy, such as psychodynamics and psychoanalysis, may help in managing some aspects of the disorder. However, in 2007, the American Psychiatric Association (APA) noted a lack of controlled studies showing their efficacy, "in dealing with the core symptoms of OCD". For body-focused repetitive behaviors, behavioral interventions such as habit reversal training and decoupling are recommended.

Psychotherapy in combination with psychiatric medication may be more effective than either option alone for individuals with severe OCD. ERP coupled with weight restoration and SSRIs has proven the most effective when treating OCD and an eating disorder simultaneously.

=== Medication ===
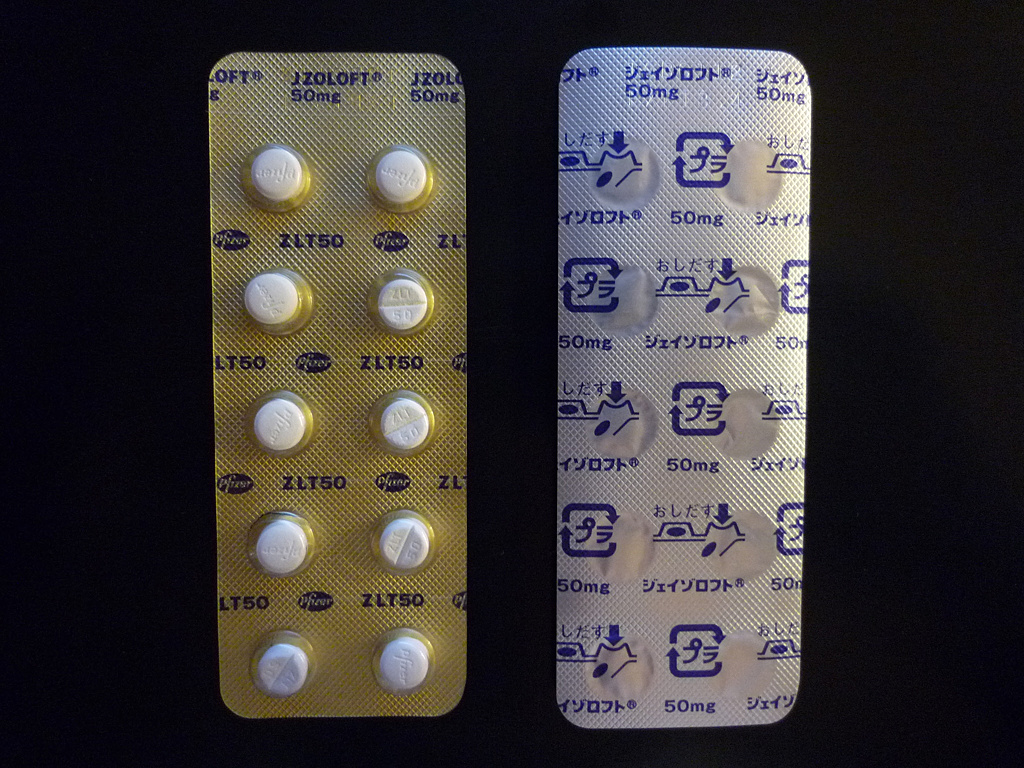
A blister pack of sertraline under the brand name Zoloft

The medications most frequently used to treat OCD are antidepressants, including selective serotonin reuptake inhibitors (SSRIs). SSRIs such as sertraline and fluoxetine are effective in treating OCD for children and adolescents. However, ERP alone may be as effective as ERP combined with an SSRI for OCD symptoms. A 2025 network meta-analysis of 71 randomized trials found that combining exposure therapy with an SSRI was more helpful for children with OCD than taking an SSRI by itself.

SSRIs are a second-line treatment of adult OCD with mild functional impairment and as first-line treatment for those with moderate or severe impairment. In children, SSRIs can be considered as a second-line therapy in those with moderate to severe impairment, with close monitoring for psychiatric adverse effects. Patients treated with SSRIs are about twice as likely to respond to treatment as are those treated with placebo, so this treatment is qualified as efficacious. Meta-analyses suggest that higher SSRI doses may produce greater symptom improvement in OCD, although higher doses are also associated with increased adverse effects. Efficacy has been demonstrated both in short-term (6–24 weeks) treatment trials and in discontinuation trials with durations of 28–52 weeks.

Clomipramine, a medication belonging to the class of tricyclic antidepressants, appears to work as well as SSRIs, but has a higher rate of side effects. Clomipramine has been shown to be more effective than placebo.

In 2006, the National Institute for Health and Care Excellence (NICE) guidelines recommended augmentative second-generation (atypical) antipsychotics for treatment-resistant OCD. Current evidence is limited regarding their use as monotherapy in OCD. For OCD treatment, there is tentative short-term evidence supporting risperidone and aripiprazole, insufficient evidence for olanzapine, and quetiapine shows no significant benefit versus placebo, with overall conclusions limited by a small number of studies.

=== Procedures ===
The United States Food and Drug Administration (FDA) approved transcranial magnetic stimulation (TMS) as a new treatment for treatment-resistant OCD in 2018. Existing evidence suggests that repetitive TMS (rTMS), particularly targeting the dorsolateral prefrontal cortex and supplementary motor area, effectively reduces obsessive–compulsive disorder symptoms.

The evidence is insufficient to conclude that electroconvulsive therapy is an effective treatment for OCD. Evidence is limited to low-quality case reports/series that suggest possible benefit in some severe, treatment-resistant cases; however, no randomized trials have been performed, leaving its efficacy unproven.

Surgery may be used as a last resort in people who do not improve with other treatments. In this procedure, a surgical lesion is made in an area of the brain (the cingulate cortex). In one study, 30% of participants benefitted significantly from this procedure. Deep brain stimulation and vagus nerve stimulation are possible surgical options that do not require destruction of brain tissue. However, because deep brain stimulation can produce rapid and intense changes, individuals may experience identity challenges afterward. In the United States, the FDA approved deep brain stimulation for the treatment of OCD under a humanitarian device exemption, requiring that the procedure be performed only in a hospital with special qualifications to do so.

In the United States, psychosurgery for OCD is a treatment of last resort and will not be performed until the person has failed several attempts at medication (at the full dosage) with augmentation, and many months of intensive cognitive behavioral therapy with exposure and ritual/response prevention.

=== Children ===
Therapeutic treatment may be effective in reducing ritual behaviors of OCD for children and adolescents. Similar to the treatment of adults with OCD, cognitive behavioral therapy, along with exposure and response prevention (ERP) therapy, stands as an effective and validated first line of treatment of OCD in children. Family involvement, in the form of behavioral observations and reports, is a key component to the success of such treatments. Parental interventions also provide positive reinforcement for a child who exhibits appropriate behaviors as alternatives to compulsive responses. In a recent meta-analysis of evidenced-based treatment of OCD in children, family-focused individual CBT was labeled as "probably efficacious", establishing it as one of the leading psychosocial treatments for youth with OCD. After one or two years of therapy, during which a child learns the nature of their obsession and acquires strategies for coping, they may acquire a larger circle of friends, exhibit less shyness and become less self-critical. Trials have shown that children and adolescents with OCD should begin treatment with the combination of CBT with a selective serotonin reuptake inhibitor (SSRI) or CBT alone, rather than only an SSRI. A 2024 systematic review of the literature found that combining ERP therapy with SSRIs can enhance treatment outcomes compared to using SSRIs alone, and that ERP alone is as efficacious as SSRIs in combination with ERP for treatment of OCD in children. ERP therapy can be done in-office or via telehealth since there was no statistically significant difference in effectiveness as shown in the AHRQ study. A 2025 meta-analysis found that exposure and response prevention and SSRIs are the most commonly studied treatments, with more limited evidence for newer approaches such as antipsychotic augmentation and neuromodulation.

Although the known causes of OCD in younger age groups range from brain abnormalities to psychological preoccupations, life stress such as bullying and traumatic familial deaths may also contribute to childhood cases of OCD, and acknowledging these stressors can play a role in treating the disorder.

== Prognosis ==
Quality of life is reduced across all domains in OCD, which is vastly chronic. While psychological or pharmacological treatment can lead to a reduction of OCD symptoms and an increase in reported quality of life, symptoms may persist at moderate levels even following adequate treatment courses, and completely symptom-free periods are uncommon. In pediatric OCD, around 40% still have the disorder in adulthood and around 40% qualify for remission. The risk of having at least one comorbid personality disorder in OCD is 52%, which is the highest among anxiety disorders and greatly impacts its management and prognosis.

== Epidemiology ==
Age-standardized disability-adjusted life year estimated rates for obsessive-compulsive disorder per 100,000 inhabitants in 2004 no data <45 45–52.5 52.5–60 60–67.5 67.5–75 75–82.5 82.5–90 90–97.5 97.5–105 105–112.5 112.5–120 >120

Obsessive–compulsive disorder affects about 2.3% of people at some point in their life, with the yearly rate about 1.2%. OCD occurs worldwide. It is unusual for symptoms to begin after the age of 35 and half of people develop problems before 20. Over 80% of OCD cases begin by early adulthood. Men and women are affected at roughly equal rates. However, there is an earlier age for onset for males than females.

== History ==
Plutarch, an ancient Greek philosopher and historian, describes an ancient Roman man who possibly had scrupulosity, which could be a symptom of OCD or OCPD. This man is described as "turning pale under his crown of flowers", praying with a "faltering voice" and scattering "incense with trembling hands".

In the 7th century AD, John Climacus records an instance of a young monk plagued by constant and overwhelming "temptations to blasphemy" consulting an older monk, who told him: "My son, I take upon myself all the sins which these temptations have led you, or may lead you, to commit. All I require of you is that for the future you pay no attention to them whatsoever." The Cloud of Unknowing, a Christian mystical text from the late 14th century, recommends dealing with recurring obsessions by attempting to ignore them, and, if that fails, to "cower under them like a poor wretch and a coward overcome in battle, and reckon it to be a waste of your time for you to strive any longer against them", a technique now known as emotional flooding.

Abu Zayd al-Balkhi, the 9th-century Islamic polymath, was likely the first to classify OCD into different types and pioneer cognitive behavioral therapy, in a fashion unique to his era and which was not popular in Greek medicine. In his medical treatise entitled Sustenance of the Body and Soul, al-Balkhi described obsessions particular to the disorder as "Annoying thoughts that are not real. These intrusive thoughts prevent enjoying life, and performing daily activities. They affect concentration and interfere with ability to carry out different tasks." As treatment, al-Balkhi suggested treating obsessive thoughts with positive thoughts and mind-based therapy.

From the 14th to the 16th century in Europe, it was believed that people who experienced blasphemous, sexual or other obsessive thoughts were possessed by the devil. Based on this reasoning, treatment involved banishing the "evil" from the "possessed" person through exorcism. The vast majority of people who thought that they were possessed by the devil did not have hallucinations or other "spectacular symptoms" but "complained of anxiety, religious fears, and evil thoughts". In 1584, a woman from Kent, England, named Mrs. Davie, described by a justice of the peace as "a good wife", was nearly burned at the stake after she confessed that she experienced constant, unwanted urges to murder her family.

The English term obsessive–compulsive arose as a translation of German Zwangsvorstellung (obsession) used in the first conceptions of OCD by Karl Westphal. Westphal's description went on to influence Pierre Janet, who further documented features of OCD. In the early 1910s, Sigmund Freud attributed obsessive–compulsive behavior to unconscious conflicts that manifest as symptoms. Freud describes the clinical history of a typical case of "touching phobia" as starting in early childhood, when the person has a strong desire to touch an item. In response, the person develops an "external prohibition" against this type of touching. However, this "prohibition does not succeed in abolishing" the desire to touch; all it can do is repress the desire and "force it into the unconscious". Freudian psychoanalysis remained a dominant treatment for OCD until the mid-1980s, even though medicinal and therapeutic treatments were known and available, because it was widely thought that these treatments would be detrimental to the effectiveness of the psychotherapy. In the mid-1980s, this approach changed and practitioners began treating OCD primarily with medicine and practical therapy rather than through psychoanalysis.

One of the first successful treatments of OCD, exposure and response prevention, emerged during the 1960s, when psychologist Vic Meyer exposed two hospitalized patients to anxiety-inducing situations while preventing them from performing any compulsions. Eventually, both patients' anxiety level dropped to manageable levels. Meyer devised this procedure from his analysis of fear extinguishment in animals via flooding. The success of ERP clinically and scientifically has been summarized as "spectacular" by prominent OCD researcher Stanley Rachman decades following Meyer's creation of the method.

In 1967, psychiatrist Juan José López-Ibor reported that the drug clomipramine was effective in treating OCD. Many reports of its success in treatment followed and several studies had confirmed its effectiveness by the 1980s. However, clomipramine was subsequently displaced by new SSRIs developed in the 1970s, such as fluoxetine and sertraline, which were shown to have fewer side effects.

Many people, particularly those with contamination-related OCD, experienced new or worsened symptoms related to COVID-19 during the first few months of the pandemic.

=== Notable cases ===
John Bunyan (1628–1688), the author of The Pilgrim's Progress, displayed symptoms of OCD (which had not yet been named). During the most severe period of his condition, he would mutter the same phrase over and over again to himself while rocking back and forth. He later described his obsessions in his autobiography Grace Abounding to the Chief of Sinners, stating, "These things may seem ridiculous to others, even as ridiculous as they were in themselves, but to me they were the most tormenting cogitations." He wrote two pamphlets advising those with similar anxieties. In one of them, he warns against indulging in compulsions: "Have care of putting off your trouble of spirit in the wrong way: by promising to reform yourself and lead a new life, by your performances or duties."

British poet, essayist and lexicographer Samuel Johnson (1709–1784) had OCD. He had elaborate rituals for crossing the thresholds of doorways and repeatedly walked up and down staircases counting the steps. He would touch every post on the street as he walked past, only step in the middle of paving stones and repeatedly perform tasks as though they had not been done properly the first time.

The "Rat Man", real name Ernst Lanzer, a patient of Sigmund Freud, suffered from what was then called "obsessional neurosis". Lanzer's illness was characterised most famously by a pattern of distressing intrusive thoughts in which he feared that his father or a female friend would be subjected to a purported Chinese method of torture in which rats would be encouraged to gnaw their way out of a victim's body by a hot poker.

American aviator and filmmaker Howard Hughes is known to have had OCD, primarily an obsessive fear of germs and contamination. Friends of Hughes have also mentioned his obsession with minor flaws in clothing. This was conveyed in The Aviator (2004), a film biography of Hughes.

English singer-songwriter George Ezra has spoken about his life-long struggle with OCD, particularly primarily obsessional obsessive–compulsive disorder.

Swedish climate activist Greta Thunberg is also known to have OCD, among other mental health conditions.

Passing for Normal: A Memoir of Compulsion (2000) is a memoir by Amy Wilensky about her experience of OCD and Tourette syndrome.

American actor James Spader has spoken about his OCD. In 2014, when interviewed for Rolling Stone he said: "I'm obsessive–compulsive. I have very, very strong obsessive–compulsive issues. I'm very particular. [...] It's very hard for me, you know? It makes you very addictive in behavior, because routine and ritual become entrenched. But in work, it manifests itself in obsessive attention to detail and fixation. It serves my work very well: Things don't slip by. But I'm not very easygoing."

In 2022 the president of Chile Gabriel Boric stated that he had OCD, saying: "I have an obsessive–compulsive disorder that's completely under control. Thank God I've been able to undergo treatment and it doesn't make me unable to carry out my responsibilities as the President of the Republic."

In a documentary released in 2023, the footballer David Beckham discussed his compelling cleaning rituals, need for symmetry in the fridge and the impact of OCD on his life.

In 2018, American rapper NF was diagnosed with obsessive–compulsive disorder. He addresses his experience with mental illness and therapy frequently in his music, particularly in the 2023 album Hope.

In 2025, actress Jenna Ortega revealed that she struggles with it noting: "[I have] pretty intense OCD. Repetitive thoughts and counting everything multiple times and having to do the same action over and over... Sometimes my nights consist of just being really exhausted and going up and down the stairs six times because that's what I think I need to do to make sure no one breaks into my home."

== Society and culture ==
=== Art, entertainment and media ===
Movies and television shows may portray idealized or incomplete representations of disorders such as OCD. Compassionate and accurate literary and on-screen depictions may help counteract the potential stigma associated with an OCD diagnosis and lead to increased public awareness, understanding and sympathy for such disorders.

- The play and film adaptations of The Odd Couple are based around the character of Felix, who shows some of the common symptoms of OCD.
- In the film As Good as It Gets (1997), actor Jack Nicholson portrays a man with OCD who performs ritualistic behaviors that disrupt his life.
- The film Matchstick Men (2003) portrays a con man named Roy (Nicolas Cage) with OCD who opens and closes doors three times while counting aloud before he can walk through them.
- Martin Scorsese's biographical drama film The Aviator (2004) portrays the life of Howard Hughes from 1927 to 1947, when he became a successful film producer and an aviation magnate while simultaneously growing more unstable due to severe obsessive–compulsive disorder (OCD).
- In the television series Monk (2002–2009), the titular character Adrian Monk fears both human contact and dirt.
- The one-man show The Life and Slimes of Marc Summers (2016), a stage adaptation of Marc Summers's 1999 memoir which recounts how OCD affected his entertainment career.
- In the novel Turtles All the Way Down (2017) by John Green, teenage main character Aza Holmes struggles with OCD that manifests as a fear of the human microbiome. Throughout the story, Aza repeatedly opens an unhealed callus on her finger to drain out what she believes are pathogens. The novel is based on Green's own experiences with OCD. He explained that Turtles All the Way Down is intended to show how "most people with chronic mental illnesses also live long, fulfilling lives".
- In the film The House That Jack Built (2018), the titular character, a serial killer, compulsively cleans a crime scene after obsessing over leaving evidence.
- The British TV series Pure (2019) stars Charly Clive as 24-year-old Marnie, who is plagued by disturbing sexual thoughts, as a kind of primarily obsessional obsessive–compulsive disorder.

== Research ==
Cortical thickness differences in adults with OCD are linked to a network of brain-specific, developmentally expressed genes.

OCD patients have thicker precentral and paracentral brain regions compared to controls and those with thinner precentral areas showed greater improvement with transcranial direct-current stimulation treatment, suggesting these structural differences may serve as neural biomarkers for predicting treatment response.

Glutamatergic medications, such as N-acetylcysteine (NAC) and memantine, may improve symptoms of OCD, though high heterogeneity and potential publication bias warrant cautious interpretation. Augmenting SSRIs with NAC may modestly reduce OCD symptoms without increasing adverse events, though it may have limited efficacy. Ketamine, an N-methyl-D-aspartate (NMDA) glutamate receptor antagonist, has shown potential for rapid and tolerable symptom relief in OCD, although evidence remains limited and inconsistent.

Psychedelics have been investigated for their potential use in treating OCD; psilocybin is generally well-tolerated in OCD, with symptom reduction for some patients, but repeated dosing may be needed to maintain effects.

== See also ==
- Delusional disorder
- Hypochondria
- Animal psychopathology § Obsessive–compulsive disorder (OCD)
