= Herpetophobia =

Fear of reptiles

- A U.S. Air Force Airman handles a snake to overcome herpetophobia.
- Specialty: Psychology

Herpetophobia is a common specific phobia, which consists of fear or aversion to reptiles, commonly lizards and snakes, and similar vertebrates, such as amphibians. It is one of the most diffused animal phobias, very similar and related to ophidiophobia. This condition causes a slight to severe emotional reaction, for example anxiety, panic attack or most commonly nausea. Herpetophobia is a common phobia and comes in many forms. Some people have fears of just looking at a reptile, some have fears of touching a reptile, and some cannot even stand knowing a reptile is in their space. Due to the specific type of phobia, there are no individual statistics for those who suffer from herpetophobia. Not everyone who is scared or has a fear of reptiles has herpetophobia.

== Specific reptiles that may cause herpetophobia ==
- Snakes
- Lizards
- Turtles
- Tortoises
- Tuataras
- Alligators
- Crocodiles
- Caimans
- Dinosaurs

== Causes ==
The cause of the phobia is different for everyone and varies from person to person, meaning that the cause is still unknown. The phobia is likely to be caused by an experience that is traumatic either negative, scary experience, or painful experience. Herpetophobia can affect people of all ages but is more common in children. Herpetophobia may also be caused by a family member's same fear making the other person also scared and gain the phobia. Seeing another person having a phobia it may make someone else scared and maybe frightened by the reptile.

== Signs and symptoms ==
The physiological signs are when an individual is unable to control the fear, anxiety, and panic that arises even when those who are experiencing the fear are not in danger. When you are around reptiles you are unable to function or concentrate.

Signs and symptoms include:

- Increased heart rate
- Shaking
- Shortness of breath
- Sweating
- Dizziness or faintness
- Nausea
- Chills or heat flush
- Feeling of choking

In some instances, people who have Herpetophobia may cry, freeze, and cling to others in their environment.

== Conditioning experiences ==
- Putting a fake look-alike reptile in front of someone with herpetophobia.
- Making a reptile noise in front of someone with herpetophobia.
- Rubbing something that feels like a reptile to someone with herpetophobia.

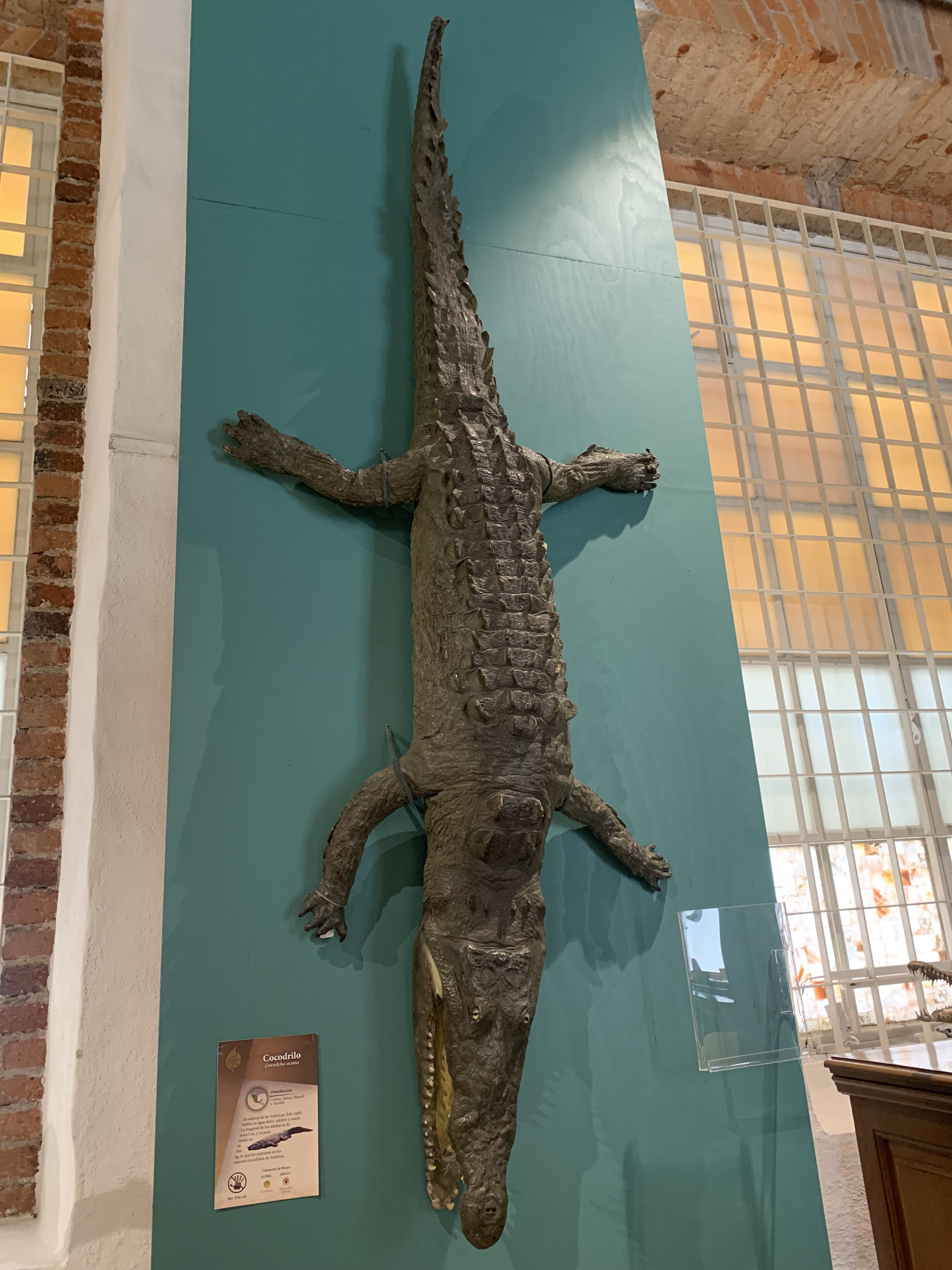
Reptiles en el Museo Universitario de Historia Natural "Dr. Manuel M. Villada" UAEMéx 03

This is an image that may cause herpetophobia due to its realistic features.

== Behavior ==
Those with herpetophobia tend to go out of their way to avoid the reptile and will do anything to avoid herpetophobia. This may lead to self-isolation, and depression, and change the way they live. The sufferers may affect their work and social lives which can lead to isolation.

== Management and treatment ==
Those with herpetophobia may utilize three types of therapy. One is exposure therapy, which is when your therapist slowly introduces you to reptiles. Some types of Exposure therapy include:

- Imaginal exposure therapy- This process makes a person imagine that there are reptiles all around them to help cope with their fear.
- Graded exposure therapy- This process is where repeated exposure to the feared stimulus leads to a reduction in the fear response over time.
- Vivo exposure treatment- this process directly exposes the patient to the reptiles by either the doctor holding the reptile in front of the patient or the patient the reptile
- Virtual reality exposure Virtual reality therapy - this treatment is when they use virtual reality to expose the patient to real-life things even though it is fake and not happening in real life
- Flooding therapy Flooding (psychology)- this process uses cooping techniques that are associated with feelings to help the patient relax while dealing with the fear.

The second type is Cognitive behavioral therapy, which is used to help identify and change the negative experience you had with reptiles. The third type is desensitization therapy Desensitization (psychology) where the doctor allows the treatment process to progress on its own which may help to reduce the discomfort those feel while facing their fear. Some coping mechanisms that may work are:

- Understanding your phobia
- Visualizing yourself getting over the fear
- Desensitization (psychology)
- Changing negative thoughts
- Creating a Fear Ladder
- Practicing meditation and yoga
- Learning breathing exercises
- Seeking personal support or a support group

Some medications that have been found beneficial for herpetophobia are Benzodiazepine, Antidepressant, and Beta blocker. The drugs aren't a cure, but they are used to help cope with the phobia and may only be effective for a short amount of time.
