= Vic Meyer =

British psychologist (died 2005)

Victor Campbell Meyer
- Other name: Vic Meyer
- Occupation: Psychologist
- Known for: Behavioral therapy (exposure response prevention)

Victor Campbell Meyer, or Vic Meyer, was a British psychologist at the Middlesex Hospital Medical School of the University of London (now UCL Medical School) and has been called the father of behavioral case formulation, an approach toward understanding complex psychiatric problems using learning principles derived from scientific psychological research and uniquely adapted to the individual case by means of the experimental method as a way to develop an effective intervention regimen. Meyer is credited by the British Psychological Society for his influential work in creating case formulation along with three other innovators: Hans Eysenck, Monte B. Shapiro, and Ira Turkat. Turkat credited Meyer as the pioneer of the framework of what is generally known today as case formulation, a required core skill for all British practicing psychologists since 2011.

== Early years ==
Prior to becoming a psychologist, Meyer was an RAF pilot. His plane was shot down in France during the Second World War, and he was captured as a Prisoner of War.

== Early career ==
Early in his career as a psychologist (mid 1960s), Meyer created the first successful psychological treatment for obsessive–compulsive motor rituals known as response prevention — which became a well established, scientifically validated treatment method used around the world for children and adults so afflicted. Meyer devised this procedure from his analysis of fear extinguishment in animals via flooding and applied it to human cases in the psychiatric setting that, at the time, were considered intractable. The treatment procedure is currently called exposure and response prevention (ERP) and its success clinically and scientifically has been summarized as "spectacular" by prominent psychology professor, Stanley Rachman decades following Meyer's creation of the method. Meyer was among the first psychologists to show that complex psychiatric problems could indeed be treated successfully by psychological methods.

== Boards and program creations ==
Meyer was the Founding President of the British Association for Behavioral and Cognitive Psychotherapies (originally known as the British Association of Behavioral Psychotherapy) and served as its first president in 1972. He also created the first behavior therapy training program in the United Kingdom at the Middlesex Hospital.

== Recognition ==
Meyer was known as the top clinical trainer in behavior therapy in the United Kingdom. American psychologist Ira Turkat who worked with Meyer, described Meyer as the most fascinating interviewer he had ever seen, who not only attracted therapists from around the world to London to observe his interviewing and case formulation skills, but Meyer often traveled across the globe interviewing patients in front of audiences of mental health professionals to teach his case formulation approach. Meyer's interview demonstrations in front of mental health professional audiences excited other psychologists' interest.
