= Desensitization (psychology) =

Diminished responsiveness to a stimulus after repeated exposure

- MeSH: D003887

Desensitization is a psychology term related to a treatment or process that diminishes emotional responsiveness to a negative or aversive stimulus after repeated exposure. This process typically occurs when an emotional response is repeatedly triggered, but the action tendency associated with the emotion proves irrelevant or unnecessary.

Psychologist Mary Cover Jones pioneered early desensitization techniques to help individuals unlearn (or dissociate from) phobias and anxieties. Her work laid the foundation for later structured approaches to desensitization therapy, aimed at gradually reducing emotional reactions to previously distressing situations.

In 1958, Joseph Wolpe developed a ranked list of anxiety-evoking stimuli ordered by intensity to help individuals gradually adapt to their fears. Wolpe's reciprocal inhibition desensitization process is based on established psychology theories, including drive-reduction theory and reciprocal inhibition.

Although anti-anxiety medication is available, empirical evidence supports desensitization with high rates of cure, particularly in clients with depression or schizophrenia.

== Steps ==
The hierarchical list is constructed by ordering fears or phobias from least to most disturbing. By using techniques that produce deep relaxation, an individual can then confront each phobia in scenes of increasing intensity. An example of this is a person with a fear of heights being desensitized by going up a ladder one step at a time. These scenes are done until the phobia no longer causes anxiety or fear. This is then repeated until the hierarchy is completed. As it is impossible to simultaneously feel anxiety and relaxation, easing into deep relaxation helps inhibit any anxiety.

Systematic desensitization (a guided reduction in fear, anxiety, or aversion) can then be achieved by gradually approaching the feared stimulus while maintaining relaxation. Desensitization works best when individuals are directly exposed to the feared stimuli and situations, so anxiety-evoking stimuli are paired with inhibitory responses. This is done either by individuals performing in real-life situations (vivo desensitization) or, if it is not practical to directly act out the steps of hierarchy, by observing models performing the feared behavior (vicarious desensitization). Individuals slowly move up the hierarchy, repeating performances if necessary, until the last item on the list is performed without fear or anxiety.

It is not necessary for the hierarchy of scenes to be presented in a specific order, nor is it essential for an individual to master a relaxation response. Further, research suggests that none of the three conditions listed above are required for successful desensitization when taken as a whole. The only prerequisite appears to be the ability to imagine frightening scenes, which need not be ordered in a particular order or lead to the relaxation of the muscles.

== Suggested mechanisms ==
=== Reciprocal inhibition ===
Reciprocal inhibition is based on the idea that two opposing neurological states, such as relaxation and anxiety, cannot coexist, meaning that methods which produce calmness by activating the parasympathetic nervous system, such as deep muscle relaxation, may reduce the responses typically associated with fear-inducing stimuli.

Critics of reciprocal inhibition point out that the preparation of opposing mental states is not a necessary part of the process of desensitization.

=== Counterconditioning ===
Counterconditioning is similar to reciprocal inhibition because both theories involve the use of relaxation to inhibit anxiety. However, while reciprocal inhibition is a neurological theory which focuses on the brain, counterconditioning is a behavioral theory focusing on observable responses to stressors. This mechanism has been used to explain the long-term effects of systematic desensitization and how it reduces avoidance responses, including those which contribute to anxiety disorders.

For reasons similar to reciprocal inhibition, the idea that counterconditioning is the fundamental mechanism for desensitization has received criticism because there are effective therapies which do not seem to involve the use of a replacement emotion for anxiety.

=== Habituation ===
Habituation theory explains that with increased exposure to stimulus, there will be a decreased fear response. While habituation has been shown to reduce overall phobia responses in people with specific phobias, it not supported as an explanation of desensitization due to its reversible and short-term nature.

=== Extinction ===
Extinction is a model that demonstrates how learned behaviors decrease through the absence of anticipated reinforcement. Extinction is not only when a previously learned value lessens, but also when a new association being created leads to a new value being learned. However, this cannot be used to explain why desensitization works, as it solely describes the functional relationship between absent reinforcement and phobic responses and lacks an actual mechanism for why the relationship exists. Desensitization is a form of exposure therapy which in turn leads to the unwanted behavior becoming extinct due to the learned associations becoming weakened.

A criticism of the extinction model is that repeated exposure may be insufficient due to it likely already happened during the lives of people with specific phobias.

=== Two-factor model ===
Exposure to phobic stimuli with a subsequent avoidance response may strengthen the future anxiety because the avoidance response reduces the stress, thereby reinforcing the avoidant behavior. As such, exposure with non-avoidance is seen as essential in the desensitization process.

=== Self-efficacy ===
Self-efficacy is an individual's personal assessment of their ability to successfully do something in a certain situation. A person's belief in themself being able to cope increases particularly when moving up the exposure hierarchy and having confirmatory experiences of coping from the lower levels. A high self-efficacy is shown to enhance the extinction of an unwanted behavior.

This explanation for desensitization lacks an explanation for how heightened anticipation of fear reduction leads to reduced fear responses. It also does not address whether desensitization effectively occurs if an individual does not experience decreased fear responses, potentially leading their anxiety response to reaffirm their phobia instead.

=== Expectancy theory ===
Expectancy theory suggests that because people anticipate the therapy working, they will respond accordingly and display reduced anxiety. Those with high expectancy change (receiving full expectancy treatment) have shown comparable results to those who had systematic desensitization therapy, suggesting it is simply a change in expectancy that reduces fear responses.

=== Emotional processing theory ===
Excessive fear can be understood as a problem with processing information in a persons fear network, leading to exaggerated responses. As such, desensitization can be achieved through accessing the fear network by matching stimuli with information in the fear network, and then having the person engage with the stimuli to input new information into the network by invalidating preexisting ideas.

== Neuroscience ==
=== Medial prefrontal cortex ===
When the medial prefrontal cortex is damaged, desensitization can be more difficult. Neurons in this area aren't fired during the desensitization process despite reducing spontaneous fear responses when artificially fired, suggesting the area stores extinction memories that reduce phobic responses to future stimuli related to the phobia (conditioned), explaining the long-term impact of desensitization.

=== N-methyl-D-aspartate glutamatergic receptors ===
NMDA receptors have been found to play a key role in the extinction of fear, allowing the use of an agonist to accelerate the desensitization process.

== Dopamine desensitization ==
Dopamine desensitization (also referred to in neuroscience as dopamine receptor desensitization or dopamine receptor downregulation) occurs when prolonged or excessive stimulation by dopamine leads to a reduced cellular response. The overactivation of D1 and D2 receptors can trigger receptor internalization or decreased receptor density, diminishing the brain's reward signaling capacity.

This phenomenon is a key factor in tolerance seen in addiction: repeated exposure to substances like cocaine, amphetamine, opioids, alcohol, or nicotine lowers D2 receptor availability in the striatum, necessitating higher doses to achieve previous reward levels. Dopamine dysregulation is also evident in clinical contexts such as Parkinson's disease, where dopamine replacement therapy can lead to Dopamine dysregulation syndrome, a compulsion-like state associated with decreased dopamine receptor response.

On a cellular level, dopamine receptor desensitization involves G-protein coupled receptor (GPCR) kinases and phosphorylation cascades, which modulate receptor responsiveness and internalization. This process can also alter reward processing and motivation, contributing to behavioral changes in addiction and other neuropsychiatric conditions.

== Self-control desensitization ==
Self-control desensitization is a variant of systematic desensitization which instead of a passive counterconditioning model, uses an active, mediational, and coping skills change model. It uses coping mechanisms like relaxation as an alternative to an anxiety response when anxiety-inducing stimuli are present. In-person practise in actual anxiety-producing situations is encouraged. It is comparable to other methods for controlling anxiety, like applied relaxation and anxiety management training. Self-control desensitization is effective for various anxiety disorders but is not more effective than other cognitive or behavioural techniques.

During self-control desensitization, individuals are told that they have learned to react to certain situations by becoming anxious, tense, or nervous based on previous experiences, and that they can learn new, more flexible coping skills. They are instructed to use relaxation techniques and other coping mechanisms in a hierarchy of anxiety-producing situations to reduce tensions and serve as covert rehearsal for future scenarios. These techniques include breathing control, attention to internal sensations, and relaxation techniques.

== Criticism and developments ==
There is a general consensus among researchers that exposure is the key element of desensitization. This suggests the steps leading up to the actual exposure, such as relaxation techniques and the development of an exposure hierarchy, are redundant steps for effective desensitization.

Crucial elements for a successful therapeutic outcome in both desensitisation and more conventional forms of psychotherapy are the cognitive and social aspects of the therapeutic situation. These factors include the expectation of therapeutic benefit, the therapist's ability to foster social reinforcement, the information-feedback of approximations towards successful fear reduction, training in attention control, and learning different forms of non-avoidance behaviour through instructed imagination.

== Effects on animals ==
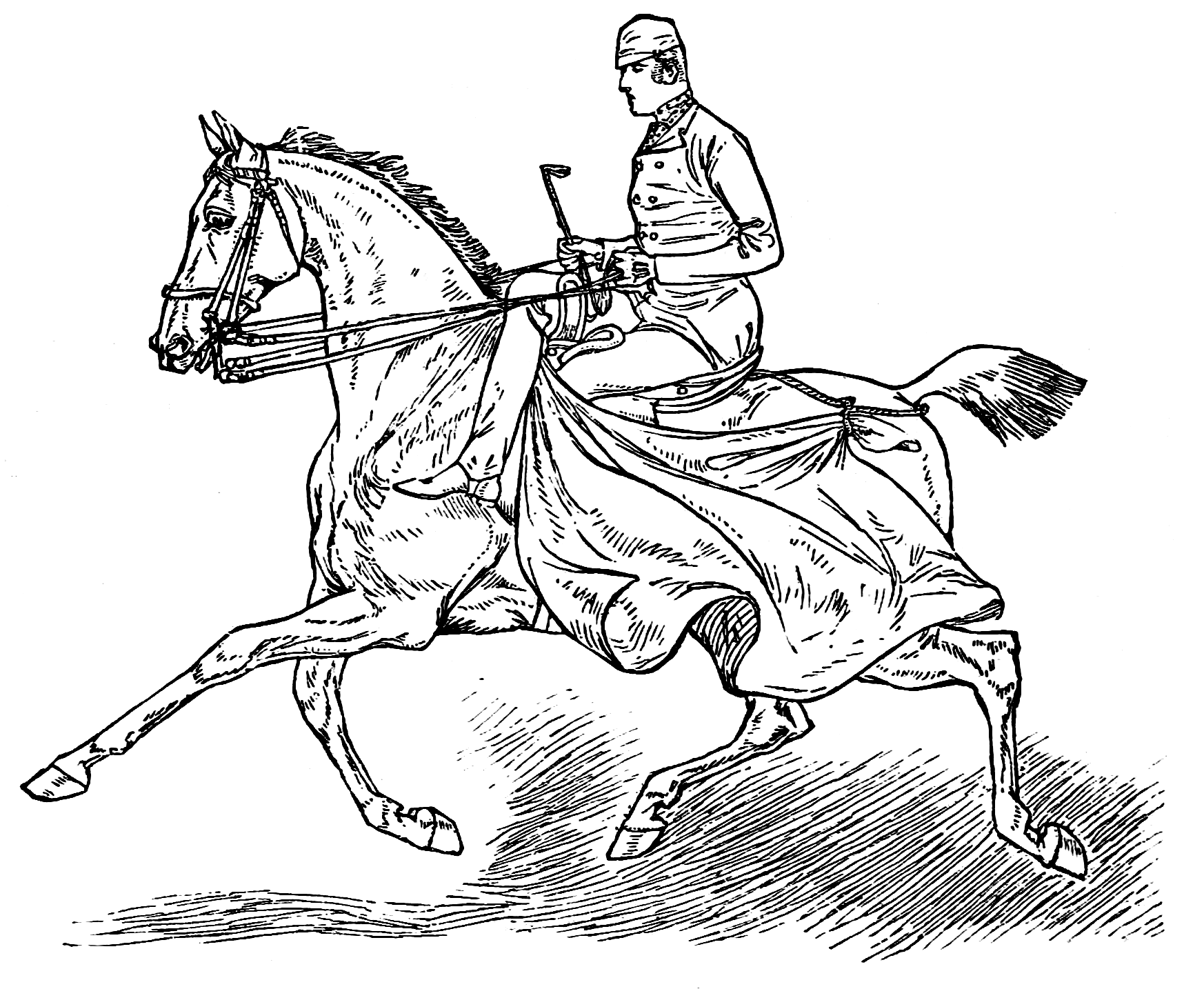
Horses have a natural fear of unpredictable movement. Pictured is a horse being desensitized to accept the fluttering skirt of a lady's riding habit.

Desensitization is used in animal behavior modification to reduce fear, anxiety, and aggression in response to certain stimuli. This process involves using controlled and gradual exposure to a stimulus, and is done at an intensity that is low enough to avoid triggering a response. This is reported to allow the animal to habituate over time.

== Effects on violence ==
Desensitization can also refer to the potential for reduced responsiveness to actual violence caused by exposure to violence in mass media, a topic which is debated in the scientific literature. Desensitization can arise from different media sources, including TV, video games, and movies. Some scholars suggest that violence may prime thoughts of hostility, possibly affecting how we perceive others and interpret their actions. Desensitization has been shown to lower arousal to violent scenes in heavy versus light television viewers at the physiological level, and it has been suggested that those who commit extreme violence have blunted sensibilities as a result of watching violent videos repeatedly.

Desensitization to violence has been linked to a number of outcomes, such as experiencing less arousal and emotional disturbance when witnessing violence, greater hesitancy to call an adult to intervene in a witnessed physical altercation, and less sympathy for victims of domestic abuse. School shootings have sparked a lot of discussion about the desensitizing effects of violent video games and the possible involvement of shooter games, which teach gun handling skills and provide intense desensitization training.

Initial exposure to violence in the media may produce a number of aversive responses, such as increased heart rate, fear, discomfort, perspiration, and disgust. However, prolonged and repeated exposure to violence in the media may reduce or normalize the initial psychological impact until violent images do not elicit these negative responses. Eventually, an individual may become emotionally and cognitively desensitized to media violence. In one experiment, participants who played violent video games showed lower heart rates and galvanic skin responses, which was interpreted as displaying physiological desensitization to violence. However, other studies have failed to replicate this finding.

Some scholars have questioned whether becoming desensitized to media violence transfers specifically to real-life violence. Some studies focusing on how members of a group behave have demonstrated that media violence raises the likelihood that members of the group will become desensitized and act aggressively. However, this effect could potentially be influenced by individual difference variables, such as empathy, perspective taking, or trait hostility.

== See also ==
- Sensitization
- Flooding (psychology)
- Extinction (psychology)
- Habituation
- Conditioning
- Alarm fatigue
