= Delayed-maturation theory of obsessive–compulsive disorder =

Medical hypothesis

The delayed-maturation theory of obsessive–compulsive disorder suggests that obsessive–compulsive disorder (OCD) can be caused by delayed maturation of the frontal striatal circuitry or parts of the brain that make up the frontal cortex, striatum, or integrating circuits. Some researchers suspect that variations in the volume of specific brain structures can be observed in children that have OCD (Lambert, K.G; Kinsley, C.H., 2011). It has not been determined if delayed-maturation of this frontal circuitry contributes to the development of OCD or if OCD is the ailment that inhibits normal growth of structures in the frontal striatal, frontal cortex, or striatum. However, the use of neuroimaging has equipped researchers with evidence of some brain structures that are consistently less adequate and less matured in patients diagnosed with OCD in comparison to brains without OCD. More specifically, structures such as the caudate nucleus, volumes of gray matter, white matter, and the cingulate have been identified as being less developed in people with OCD in comparison to individuals that do not have OCD (Lambert, K.G.; Kinsley, C.H.). However, the cortex volume of the operculum is larger and OCD patients are also reported to have larger temporal lobe volumes; which has been identified in some women patients with OCD (Jenike, M.; Breiter, H.; at el, 1996). Further research is needed to determine the effect of these structural size differences on the onset and degree of OCD and the maturation of specific brain structures.

== History ==
=== Origins of obsessive–compulsive disorder ===
The first record of obsessive–compulsive disorder dates back to the 14th century in Europe. It was believed that people who had OCD were possessed by the devil, and treatment included a series of performed exorcisms. In the 1910s, Sigmund Freud described obsessive–compulsive disorder to a case of touching phobia. This phobia is said to start in early childhood and happens when a person has a strong desire to touch. However, the opposite can also develop where the person develops what is called external prohibition. This happens when someone has the fear of a form of touching sensation. There are some circumstances where this disorder can be delayed. The earliest signs of OCD can start showing up in as little as six months. The brain becomes even more hyperactive around 54 months, and it is easier to notice obsessive–compulsive behavior at this time. Although there is no exact date as to when OCD begins to develop in later stages of life; different environments or events in a person's life can quickly become the catalyst to the development of this disorder.

=== Origins of obsessive–compulsive disorder and neuroimaging ===
Research for psychiatric neuroimaging began in 1994 at Massachusetts General Hospital, in Boston, by Dr. Scott Rauch. The group was developed into an entire program in 2003. They discovered close collaborations between several other different disorders and the brain stem. Since the research first began, there has been a significant amount of development in regards to OCD. Studies done, via neuroimaging, show that the pathophysiology of obsessive–compulsive disorder involve abnormal functioning along specific frontal-sub-cortical brain circuits.

The use of fMRI imaging to predict and follow individual's responses is a new approach. The goal is to be able to increase the understanding of the neurology of OCD. This specific study focuses on OCD patients with different refractory time. The timeline for the type of scan is a total of about three and a half months. These individuals undergo fMRI scanning one day prior to starting treatment, plus an additional four days following the treatment.

The results of this test show the baseline brain pattern compared to the first scan they took. The first scan provides data about the activation in the frontal-striatal neural circuit, which is the area involving OCD. The difference in the brain patterns depict information regarding biological mechanisms, which underlie heterogeneity in OCD.

Over time, this fMRI testing is indicated to lead to a more accurate diagnosis of the illness as well as a better understanding of the symptoms. With the knowledge of the red-flag indicators for OCD, children with the disease may be able to detect it more efficiently early on in life. The fMRI, neuroimaging technique, is the most preferable way to scan today due to accuracy. A fMRI does not expose an individual to radiation and is a safe option in most cases. The combination of innovative psychopharmacology with neuroimaging technology has the potential to result in a dominant and comprehensive approach for individuals with OCD.

== Supporting experiments ==
=== Van de Heuvel et al, 2009 ===
The primary suggestion for the delayed-maturation theory of OCD was conducted in the Netherlands and inspired by the research of Van de Heuvel. In this study, researchers used 55 non-medicated patients with OCD and 50 age matched controls to study the relationship between symptom dimensions and specific neuroanatomical structures. It was concluded that the "specific neuroanatomical structures are associated with specific symptom dimensions". The symptoms of obsessive–compulsive behavior are associated with specific regions within the brain, and patients with similar symptoms are likely to have similar regions of the brain that are comprised due to OCD.

=== Rosenberg and Keshavan, 1998 ===
Another experiment, supporting delayed-maturation theory of obsessive–compulsive disorder, was conducted by Rosenberg and Keshavan in 1998. This research used voxel-based morphometry to investigate the development of the cingulate structure in a group children's brains, ranging 2–7 in age, observed to be OCD. This technique enabled researchers to identify a correlation between age and cingulate volume by comparing a group of control patients to a group of children that have been diagnosed with OCD. Children that do not have OCD were found to demonstrate a correlation between age and cingulate volume growth, whereas, children exhibiting traits of OCD did not display a significant correlation between age and cingulate volume. The Rosenberg and Keshavan experiment concluded that OCD patients do not exhibit a correlation of age and cingulate volume comparable to the control group of patients that did not have OCD.

=== Snider and Swedo, 2003 ===
Childhood-Onset Obsessive–Compulsive Disorder and Tic Disorders was another experiment that supported the delayed-maturation theory regarding OCD. It was conducted by Snider and Swedo in 2003. Research included the diagnosis of pediatric autoimmune neuropsychiatric disorder, associated with streptococcal infection, also known as PANDAS. Thus, requiring a prospectively determined association between group A beta-hemolytic streptococcal infection, GABHS, and obsessive–compulsive disorder or tic disorder. Screening for a GABHS infection imposes a significant burden on both patient and clinician. To heighten the index of suspicion for PANDAS, it would be useful to know if parent-reported upper respiratory infection, URI, is associated with PANDAS symptoms or associated characteristics. Eighty-three consecutive, clinically referred patients aged 6 to 17 years with a primary diagnosis of OCD and their primary caregivers were asked about. URI signs and symptoms at the time of OCD onset, PANDAS symptoms, OCD and tic symptoms, comorbidity, and putative PANDAS risk factors. Specific inquiry regarding URI symptoms proved more informative than general inquiry. In the URI present versus URI absent group, more patients experienced a sudden rather than insidious onset of symptoms. Additionally, more patients with a URI plus sudden onset exhibited a comorbid tic disorder.

=== Neuroimaging indications ===
The use of neuroimaging has made it possible for researchers to monitor and compare structural and functional differences of brains exhibiting OCD symptoms in comparison to brains that do not have OCD and to measure specific structure's neural activity. The MRI scanning techniques have identified smaller levels of white matter volume in women with OCD in comparison to control patients that do not have OCD. The use of positron emission tomographic scan, better known as the PET scan, has enabled researchers to observe structures of the OFC, anterior cingular cortex, and the striatum for evidence of abnormal neural activity. In relationship to delayed-maturation theory of obsessive–compulsive disorder, PET scans have consistently observed the caudate nucleus, cingulate volume, and volumes of both gray matter and white matter to be less consistent in patients with OCD in comparison to patients that do not have OCD. In brief, the use of neuroimaging supports delayed-maturation theory of obsessive compulsive disorder by providing researchers with concrete proof of decreased neural activity in patients with OCD in comparison to age-related patients, specifically children, without OCD.

== Treatment ==
=== Cognitive behavioral therapy ===
Cognitive behavioral therapy, which involves exposure and response prevention (ERP), is the psychosocial treatment of choice for obsessive‐compulsive disorder. Despite this, ERP is not widely used by mental health practitioners. ERP means a person would repeatedly approach or is "exposed to" the very thing/object that makes that individual anxious or uncomfortable. Afterwards, the individual would attempt to stop oneself from engaging in behaviors that are designed to lower that anxiety. Cognitive behavioral therapy, CBT, in contrast to traditional psychotherapy or "talk" therapy, is shorter in duration and focuses not so much on early life experiences or unconscious processes, but rather on "here and now" problems, and on the education and coaching of clients as they learn new ways of thinking and behaving in order to solve those problems. OCD or anxiety-producing intrusive thoughts or images, are normally followed by compulsions, or by behaviors that the individual does on purpose to lower anxiety. This is displayed by the forming thoughts such as "that thing is dirty or contaminated". Thereafter, the compulsion would be to avoid touching that certain object or thing, and it can also lead to excessive washing if the individual has touched it. The role ERP has in this matter would be to purposely have the individual touch "contaminated" things on purpose and have exposure to it. During ERP, with repeated "exposure trials", the person then "learns" to let go of the fear through a process called desensitization. In hopes of exposing the individual repeatedly to feared thoughts, things or situations over and over, it would become less of a bother or fear and essentially the individual would get accustomed to it. As this process is initially a scary process to OCD patients, they are either exposed gradually or quickly, in order to be able to handle their obsessive-compulsive behaviors allowing them to feel control of it.

=== Serotonin reuptake inhibitors ===
Drug treatment of OCD may be assumed to affect a proposed functional imbalance between the frontal lobes and other parts of the brain. Serotonin reuptake inhibitors, SRI, especially potent ones given at high doses over long periods of time, are often effective in the treatment of obsessive–compulsive disorder. However, a large percentage of patients do not respond to treatment with the SRI, and those who do respond often do not fully remit, which should be the standard goal of treatment in OCD. If a patient has been treated for several months and has not yet responded to treatment with several types of SRI medication, the physician should perform a careful assessment of resistant and/or residual clinical symptoms. Any comorbid conditions to determine which next-step treatment would be the most appropriate. One strategy for patients who have not responded to treatment with a SRI is to switch them to aserotonin-norepinephrine reuptake inhibitors.

=== Gamma ray surgery ===
The gamma ray surgery was developed from the knife experiment. It is a form of brain surgery that uses radiation to destroy spots of tissue in the brain, while giving significant relief to some people with disabling obsessive–compulsive disorder. The gamma knife directs more than 200 thin beams of gamma radiation at different angles toward a single point in a person's brain. While each beam delivers a trivial amount of radiation, the spot where they converge receives enough energy to destroy that tissue, making the gamma knife a precision tool for attacking small tumors, malformed blood vessels, and other brain disorders without opening the skull. Unfortunately, the surgical team with the most experience performing this technique has called a temporary halt to it until long-term side effects that have appeared recently can be studied.
