= Method of factors =

Technique in cognitive behavioural therapy

The Method of Factors is a technique in cognitive behavioral therapy to organise a session of exposure therapy. Rather than generating a list of objects or situations in advance (a static hierarchy) representing escalating levels of arousal and intensity of fear for a particular phobia, the Method of Factors involves identifying a fear-provoking stimulus, then identifying those features of the stimulus that control the intensity of fear. The hierarchy then emerges in the course of the exposure session as the patient seeks to maintain a moderately high arousal. Because of this emergent nature, it is referred to as a Dynamic Hierarchy
