= Complex post-traumatic stress disorder =

Mental disorder associated with trauma

- Specialty: Psychiatry, clinical psychology
- Symptoms: Hyperarousal, emotional over-stress, intrusive thoughts, emotional dysregulation, hypervigilance, negative self-beliefs, interpersonal difficulties, attention difficulties, anxiety, depression, somatization, dissociation
- Causes: Prolonged (or repetitive) exposure to a traumatic event or traumatic events
- Differential diagnosis: Post-traumatic stress disorder, borderline personality disorder, grief
- Frequency: 4% (general population)

Complex post-traumatic stress disorder (C-PTSD, CPTSD, or cPTSD) is a stress-related mental disorder generally occurring in response to complex traumas: commonly prolonged or repetitive exposure to a traumatic event or traumatic events, from which one sees little or no chance to escape.

In the ICD-11 classification, C-PTSD is a category of post-traumatic stress disorder (PTSD) with three additional clusters of significant symptoms: emotional dysregulation, negative self-beliefs (e.g., shame, guilt, failure for wrong reasons), and interpersonal difficulties known as disruptions in self-organisation (DSO). C-PTSD's symptoms include prolonged feelings of terror, worthlessness, or helplessness, distortions in identity or sense of self, and hypervigilance. Although early descriptions of C-PTSD specified the type of trauma (i.e., prolonged and repetitive), in the ICD-11 there is no requirement of a specific trauma type.

== Classifications ==
The World Health Organization (WHO)'s International Statistical Classification of Diseases has included C-PTSD since its eleventh revision that was published in 2018 and came into effect in 2022 (ICD-11). The previous edition (ICD-10) proposed a diagnosis of Enduring Personality Change after Catastrophic Event (EPCACE), which was an ancestor of C-PTSD. Healthdirect Australia (HDA) and the British National Health Service (NHS) have also acknowledged C-PTSD as a mental disorder. The American Psychiatric Association (APA) has not included C-PTSD in the Diagnostic and Statistical Manual of Mental Disorders. The related disorder, Disorders of Extreme Stress – not otherwise specified (DESNOS) was studied for inclusion in the DSM-IV, but not ultimately included. Instead, the symptoms of PTSD were expanded in the DSM-IV and then DSM-5 to better capture the range of symptoms that can follow from all types of trauma.

== Signs and symptoms ==
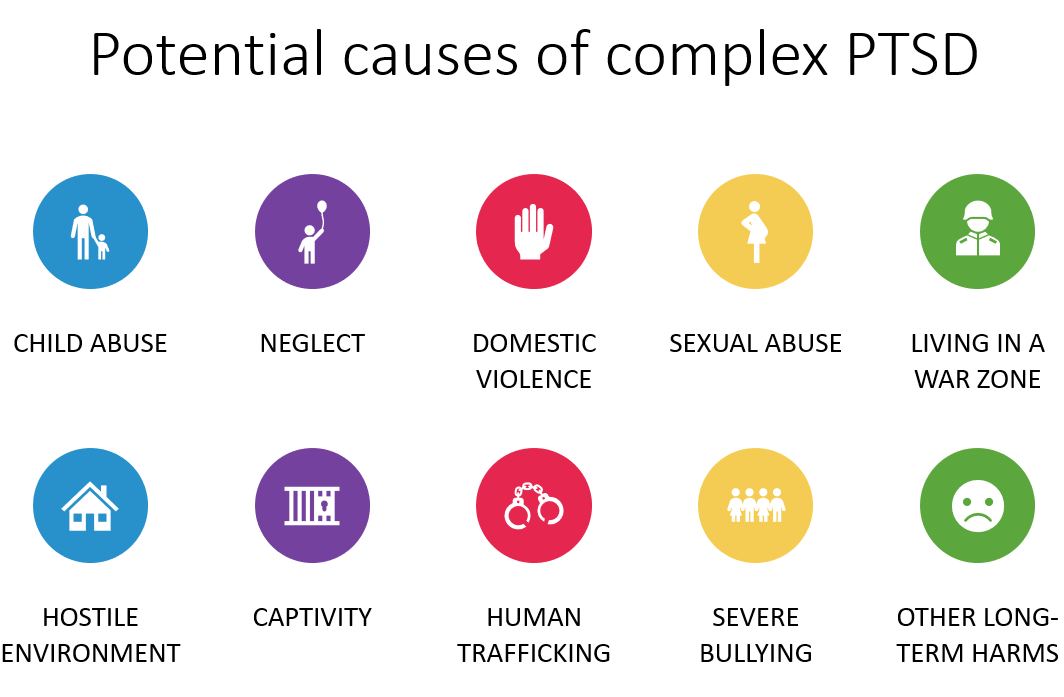
Potential causes of complex post-traumatic stress disorder

=== Children ===
The diagnosis of PTSD was originally given to adults who had suffered a trauma (e.g., during a war or rape). However, the situation for many children is quite different. Children can suffer chronic trauma such as maltreatment, family violence, school bullying, dysfunction, or a disruption in attachment to their primary caregiver. In many cases, it is the child's caregiver who causes the trauma. The diagnosis of PTSD does not take into account how the developmental stages of children may affect their symptoms and how trauma can affect a child's development.

The term developmental trauma disorder (DTD) has been proposed as the childhood equivalent of C-PTSD. This developmental form of trauma places children at risk for developing other psychiatric and medical disorders. Bessel van der Kolk explains DTD as numerous encounters with interpersonal trauma such as physical assault, sexual assault, violence, or death. It can also be brought on by subjective events such as abandonment, betrayal, defeat, or shame.

Repeated traumatization during childhood leads to symptoms that differ from those described for PTSD. Van der Kolk and others describe symptoms and behavioral characteristics in seven domains:

- Attachment: problems with relationship boundaries, lack of trust, social isolation, difficulty perceiving and responding to others' emotional states
- Biomedical symptoms: sensory-motor developmental dysfunction, sensory-integration difficulties, increased medical problems, or sometimes somatization
- Affect or emotional regulation: poor affect regulation, difficulty identifying and expressing emotions and internal states, and difficulties communicating needs, wants, and wishes
- Elements of dissociation: amnesia, depersonalization, discrete states of consciousness with discrete memories, affect, and functioning, and impaired memory for state-based events
- Behavioral control: problems with impulse control, aggression, pathological self-soothing, and sleep problems
- Cognition: difficulty regulating attention; problems with a variety of executive functions such as planning, judgment, initiation, use of materials, and self-monitoring; difficulty processing new information; difficulty focusing and completing tasks; poor object constancy; problems with cause–effect thinking; and language developmental problems such as a gap between receptive and expressive communication abilities
- Self-concept: fragmentary and/or disconnected autobiographical narrative, disturbed body image, low self-esteem, excessive shame, and negative internal working models of self

=== Adults ===
Adults with C-PTSD have sometimes experienced prolonged interpersonal traumatization beginning in childhood, rather than, or as well as, in adulthood. These early injuries interrupt the development of a robust sense of self and of others. Because physical and emotional pain or neglect was often inflicted by attachment figures such as caregivers or siblings, these individuals may develop a sense that they are fundamentally flawed and that others cannot be relied upon.

A 2025 systematic review and meta-analysis reported that the pooled prevalence for ICD-11 PTSD and C-PTSD were 2% and 4%, respectively, among adults in non-war-exposed/economically developed countries/regions. Prevalences increased to 16% and 15%, respectively, in war-exposed/less economically developed countries and regions.

Earlier descriptions of C-PTSD suggested six clusters of symptoms:

- Alterations in the regulation of affect and impulses
- Alterations in attention or consciousness
- Alterations in self-perception
- Alterations in relations with others
- Somatization
- Alterations in systems of meaning

Experiences in these areas may include:

- Changes in emotional regulation, including experiences such as persistent dysphoria, chronic suicidal preoccupation, self-injury, explosive or extremely inhibited anger (may alternate), and compulsive or extremely inhibited sexuality (may alternate).
- Variations in consciousness, such as amnesia or improved recall for traumatic events, episodes of dissociation, depersonalization/derealization, and reliving experiences (either in the form of intrusive PTSD symptoms or in ruminative preoccupation).
- Changes in self-perception, such as a sense of helplessness or paralysis of initiative, shame, guilt and self-blame, a sense of defilement or stigma, and a sense of being completely different from other human beings (may include a sense of specialness, utter aloneness, a belief that no other person can understand, or a feeling of nonhuman identity).
- Varied changes in perception of the perpetrators, such as a preoccupation with the relationship with a perpetrator (including a preoccupation with revenge), an unrealistic attribution of total power to a perpetrator (though the individual's assessment may be more realistic than the clinician's), idealization or paradoxical gratitude, a sense of a special or supernatural relationship with a perpetrator, and acceptance of a perpetrator's belief system or rationalizations.
- Alterations in relations with others, such as isolation and withdrawal, disruption in intimate relationships, a repeated search for a rescuer (may alternate with isolation and withdrawal), persistent distrust, and repeated failures of self-protection.
- Changes in systems of meaning, such as a loss of sustaining faith and a sense of hopelessness and despair.

== Diagnosis ==
C-PTSD was considered for inclusion in the DSM-IV but was excluded from the 1994 publication. It was also excluded from the DSM-5, which lists post-traumatic stress disorder. The ICD-11 has included C-PTSD since its initial publication in 2018 and a validated self-report measure exists for assessing the ICD-11 C-PTSD, which is the International Trauma Questionnaire (ITQ).

=== Differential diagnosis ===
==== Post-traumatic stress disorder ====
In the ICD-11, there are two paired diagnoses, PTSD and C-PTSD. To be diagnosed with C-PTSD, a person must also meet the diagnostic criteria for PTSD.

Aside from the traumatic event itself, PTSD has three core elements (that is, a person must have all three symptoms to be diagnosed):

1. re-experiencing the event in the form of intrusive memories, nightmares, or flashbacks,
2. deliberate avoidance of memories, thoughts, or other reminders of the event (e.g., particular people or places) in an effort to avoid re-experiencing the trauma, and
3. persistent perceptions of heightened current threat (e.g., hypervigilance, enhanced startle reaction).

These symptoms must cause impairment in important areas of functioning. Functionality that can only be obtained with significant additional effort is considered to be impaired.

C-PTSD has the same core elements as PTSD, but there are three additional symptoms that must be present:

1. severe and pervasive difficulties in regulating emotions,
2. changes in beliefs about oneself such as feeling worthless with significant shame, and
3. difficulties in maintaining close relationships with important people.

Again, these symptoms must cause significant impairment to be considered C-PTSD.

In the DSM-5, many of the symptoms of complex PTSD are now captured in the symptoms of PTSD, which are much broader than the PTSD symptoms in the ICD-11. Moreover, the DSM-5 also includes a dissociative symptom subtype.

Earlier descriptions of C-PTSD were broader but may no longer apply clinically; for instance, C-PTSD was described to include captivity, psychological fragmentation, the loss of a sense of safety, trust, and self-worth, as well as the tendency to be revictimized. Most importantly, there is a loss of a coherent sense of self: this loss, and the ensuing symptom profile, most pointedly differentiates C-PTSD from PTSD. C-PTSD has also been characterized by attachment disorder, particularly the pervasive insecure, or disorganized-type attachment. Thus, a differentiation between the diagnostic category of C-PTSD and that of PTSD has been suggested.

Continuous traumatic stress disorder (CTSD), which was introduced into the trauma literature by Gill Straker in 1987, differs from C-PTSD. It was originally used by South African clinicians to describe the effects of exposure to frequent, high levels of violence usually associated with civil conflict and political repression. The term applies to the effects of exposure to contexts in which gang violence and crime are endemic, as well as to the effects of ongoing exposure to life threats in high-risk occupations such as emergency services. It has also been used to describe ongoing relationship trauma frequently experienced by people leaving relationships which involved intimate partner violence.

Some theories, such as the structural dissociation theory, proposed that complex PTSD involves dissociation, but a recent scoping review found that many but not all (e.g., 28.6 to 76.9%) people with complex PTSD have clinically significant levels of dissociative symptoms.

==== Traumatic grief ====
Traumatic grief or complicated mourning are conditions where trauma and grief coincide. There are conceptual links between trauma and bereavement since loss of a loved one is inherently traumatic. If a traumatic event was life-threatening, but did not result in a death, then it is more likely that the survivor will experience post-traumatic stress symptoms. If a person dies, and the survivor was close to the person who died, then it is more likely that symptoms of grief will also develop. When the death is of a loved one, and was sudden or violent, then both symptoms often coincide. This is likely in children exposed to community violence.

For C-PTSD to manifest traumatic grief, the violence would occur under conditions of captivity, loss of control and disempowerment, coinciding with the death of a friend or loved one in life-threatening circumstances. This again is most likely for children and stepchildren who experience prolonged domestic or chronic community violence that ultimately results in the death of friends and loved ones. The phenomenon of the increased risk of violence and death of stepchildren is referred to as the Cinderella effect.

==== Borderline personality disorder ====
C-PTSD may share some symptoms with both PTSD and borderline personality disorder (BPD). However, there is enough evidence to also differentiate C-PTSD from borderline personality disorder.

It may help to understand the intersection of attachment theory with C-PTSD and BPD if one reads the following opinion of Bessel A. van der Kolk together with an understanding drawn from a description of BPD:

Uncontrollable disruptions or distortions of attachment bonds precede the development of post-traumatic stress syndromes. People seek increased attachment in the face of danger. Adults, as well as children, may develop strong emotional ties with people who intermittently harass, beat, and, threaten them. The persistence of these attachment bonds leads to confusion of pain and love. Trauma can be repeated on behavioural, emotional, physiologic, and neuroendocrinologic levels. Repetition on these different levels causes a large variety of individual and social suffering.

25% of those diagnosed with BPD have no known history of childhood neglect or abuse and individuals are six times as likely to develop BPD if they have a relative who was diagnosed as such compared to those who do not. One conclusion is that there is a genetic predisposition to BPD unrelated to trauma. Researchers conducting a longitudinal investigation of identical twins found that "genetic factors play a major role in individual differences of borderline personality disorder features in Western society." A 2014 study published in the European Journal of Psychotraumatology was able to compare and contrast C-PTSD, PTSD, and borderline personality disorder and found that it could distinguish between individual cases of each and when it was co-morbid, arguing for a case of separate diagnoses for each.

In Trauma and Recovery, Judith Herman expresses the additional concern that patients with C-PTSD frequently risk being misunderstood as inherently 'dependent', 'masochistic', or 'self-defeating', comparing this attitude to the historical misdiagnosis of female hysteria. However, those who develop C-PTSD do so as a result of the intensity of the traumatic bond — in which someone becomes tightly biochemically bound to someone who abuses them and the responses they learned to survive, navigate and deal with the abuse they suffered then become automatic responses, embedded in their personality over the years of trauma — a normal reaction to an abnormal situation.

== Treatment ==
While standard evidence-based treatments may be effective for treating post-traumatic stress disorder, treating complex PTSD often involves addressing interpersonal relational difficulties and a different set of symptoms, which make it more challenging to treat. Approaches that address persistent maladaptive patterns, such as schema therapy, have been proposed for complex PTSD to complement trauma-focused interventions when relational or identity issues remain unresolved.

=== Children ===
The utility of PTSD-derived psychotherapies for assisting children with C-PTSD is uncertain. This area of diagnosis and treatment calls for caution in using the category C-PTSD. Julian Ford and Bessel van der Kolk have suggested that C-PTSD may not be as useful a category for diagnosis and treatment of children as a proposed category of developmental trauma disorder (DTD). According to Courtois and Ford, for DTD to be diagnosed, it requires a:

history of exposure to early life developmentally adverse interpersonal trauma such as sexual abuse, physical abuse, violence, traumatic losses or other significant disruption or betrayal of the child's relationships with primary caregivers, which has been postulated as an etiological basis for complex traumatic stress disorders. Diagnosis, treatment planning and outcome are always relational.

Several practical, therapeutic and ethical principles for assessment and intervention have been developed and explored in the field:

- Identifying and addressing threats to the child's or family's safety and stability are the priority.
- A relational bridge must be developed to engage, retain, and maximize the benefit for the child and caregiver.
- Diagnosis, treatment planning and outcome monitoring are always relational (and) strengths-based.
- All phases of treatment should aim to enhance self-regulation competencies.
- Determining with whom, when and how to address traumatic memories.
- Preventing and managing relational discontinuities and psychosocial crises.

=== Adults ===
==== Trauma recovery model ====
Judith Lewis Herman, in her book, Trauma and Recovery, proposed a complex trauma recovery model that occurs in three stages:

1. Establishing safety
2. Remembrance and mourning for what was lost
3. Reconnecting with community and more broadly, society

Herman believes recovery can only occur within a healing relationship and only if that relationship empowers the survivor. This healing relationship need not be romantic or sexual in the colloquial sense of "relationship", however, and can also include relationships with friends, co-workers, one's relatives or children, and the therapeutic relationship. However, the first stage of establishing safety must always include a thorough evaluation of the surroundings, which might include abusive relationships. This stage might involve the need for major life changes for some patients.

Securing a safe environment requires strategic attention to the patient's economic and social ecosystem. The patient must become aware of her own resources for practical and emotional support as well as the realistic dangers and vulnerabilities in her social situation. Many patients are unable to move forward in their recovery because of their present involvement in unsafe or oppressive relationships. To gain their autonomy and their peace of mind, survivors may have to make difficult and painful life choices. Battered women may lose their homes, their friends, and their livelihood. Survivors of childhood abuse may lose their families. Political refugees may lose their homes and their homeland. The social obstacles to recovery are not generally recognized, but they must be identified and adequately addressed in order for recovery to proceed.

It has been suggested that treatment for complex PTSD should differ from treatment for PTSD by focusing on problems that cause more functional impairment than the PTSD symptoms. These problems include emotional dysregulation, dissociation, and interpersonal problems. Six suggested core components of complex trauma treatment include:

- Safety
- Self-regulation
- Self-reflective information processing
- Traumatic experiences integration
- Relational engagement
- Positive affect enhancement

The above components can be conceptualized as a three-phase model. Not every case will be the same, but the first phase will emphasize the acquisition and strengthening of adequate coping strategies as well as addressing safety issues and concerns. The next phase would focus on decreasing avoidance of traumatic stimuli and applying coping skills learned in phase one. The care provider may also begin challenging assumptions about the trauma and introducing alternative narratives about the trauma. The final phase would consist of solidifying what has previously been learned and transferring these strategies to future stressful events.

==== Neuroscientific and trauma-informed interventions ====
In practice, the forms of treatment and intervention vary from individual to individual since there is a wide spectrum of childhood experiences of developmental trauma and symptomatology, and not all survivors respond positively, uniformly, to the same treatment. Therefore, treatment is generally tailored to the individual. Recent neuroscientific research has shed some light on the impact that severe childhood abuse and neglect (trauma) has on a child's developing brain, specifically as it relates to the development of brain structures, function, and connectivity among children from infancy to adulthood. This understanding of the neurophysiological underpinning of complex trauma phenomena is what is currently referred to in the field of traumatology as 'trauma-informed' which has become the rationale which has influenced the development of new treatments specifically targeting those with childhood developmental trauma. Martin Teicher, a Harvard psychiatrist and researcher, has suggested that the development of specific complex trauma related symptomatology (and in fact the development of many adult onset psychopathologies) may be connected to gender differences and at what stage of childhood development trauma, abuse or neglect occurred. For example, it is well established that the development of dissociative identity disorder among women is often associated with early childhood sexual abuse.

==== Evidence-based PTSD treatment ====
Cognitive behavioral therapy, prolonged exposure therapy and dialectical behavioral therapy are well established forms of evidence-based intervention. These treatments are approved and endorsed by the American Psychiatric Association, the American Psychological Association and the Veteran's Administration. There is a question as to whether these PTSD treatments can also treat C-PTSD. Given that the ICD-11 C-PTSD diagnosis is relatively young, it will be years before this is adequately studied. However, some preliminary studies have examined whether PTSD treatments work equally well in those with PTSD or C-PTSD. Two different studies of phase-based PTSD treatment found that both standard PTSD treatment and phased treatment worked equally well whether participants had a diagnosis of PTSD or CPTSD (per the ITQ). Another study of an existing European intensive trauma treatment combining Prolonged Exposure and EMDR found that people with PTSD and C-PTSD had comparable decreases in PTSD and C-PTSD (though they had more severe PTSD at baseline).

One of the current challenges faced by many survivors of complex trauma (or developmental trauma disorder) is support for treatment since many of the current therapies are relatively expensive and not all forms of therapy or intervention are reimbursed by insurance companies who use evidence-based practice as a criterion for reimbursement.

==== Treatment challenges ====
It is widely acknowledged by those who work in the trauma field that there is no one single, standard, 'one size fits all' treatment for complex PTSD. There is also no clear consensus regarding the best treatment among the greater mental health professional community which included clinical psychologists, social workers, licensed therapists (MFTs) and psychiatrists. Although most trauma neuroscientifically informed practitioners understand the importance of utilizing a combination of both 'top down' and 'bottom up' interventions as well as including somatic interventions (sensorimotor psychotherapy or somatic experiencing or yoga) for processing and integrating trauma memories.

Allistair and Hull echo the sentiment of many other trauma neuroscience researchers (including Bessel van der Kolk and Bruce D. Perry) who argue:

Complex presentations are often excluded from studies because they do not fit neatly into the simple nosological categorisations required for research power. This means that the most severe disorders are not studied adequately and patients most affected by early trauma are often not recognised by services. Both historically and currently, at the individual as well as the societal level, "dissociation from the acknowledgement of the severe impact of childhood abuse on the developing brain leads to inadequate provision of services. Assimilation into treatment models of the emerging affective neuroscience of adverse experience could help to redress the balance by shifting the focus from top-down regulation to bottom-up, body-based processing."

Complex post-traumatic stress disorder is a long term mental health condition which often requires treatment by highly skilled mental health professionals who specialize in trauma informed modalities designed to process and integrate childhood trauma memories for the purposes of mitigating symptoms and improving the survivor's quality of life. Delaying therapy for people with complex PTSD, whether intentionally or not, can exacerbate the condition.

==== Recommended treatment modalities and interventions ====
While there is no one treatment which has been designed specifically for use with the adult complex PTSD population (with the exception of component based psychotherapy) there are many therapeutic interventions used by mental health professionals to treat PTSD. As of February 2017, the American Psychological Association PTSD Guideline Development Panel (GDP) strongly recommends the following for the treatment of PTSD:

1. Cognitive behavioral therapy (CBT) and trauma-focused CBT
2. Cognitive processing therapy (CPT)
3. Cognitive therapy (CT)
4. Prolonged exposure therapy (PE)

The American Psychological Association also conditionally recommends

1. Brief eclectic psychotherapy (BEP)
2. Eye movement desensitization and reprocessing (EMDR)
3. Narrative exposure therapy (NET)

While these treatments have been recommended, there is still a lack of research on the best and most efficacious treatments for complex PTSD. Psychological therapies such as cognitive behavioural therapy, eye movement desensitisation and reprocessing therapy are effective in treating C-PTSD symptoms like PTSD, depression and anxiety. For example, in a 2016, meta-analysis, four out of eight EMDR studies resulted in statistical significance, indicating the potential effectiveness of EMDR in treating certain conditions. Additionally, subjects from two of the studies continued to benefit from the treatment months later. Seven of the studies that employed psychometric tests showed that EMDR led to a reduction in depression symptoms compared to those in the placebo group. Mindfulness and relaxation is effective for PTSD symptoms, emotion regulation and interpersonal problems for people whose complex trauma is related to sexual abuse.

Many commonly used treatments are considered complementary or alternative since there is still a lack of research to classify these approaches as evidence-based. Some of these additional interventions and modalities include:

- biofeedback
- dyadic resourcing (used with EMDR)
- emotionally focused therapy
- equine-assisted therapy
- expressive arts therapy
- internal family systems therapy
- dialectical behavior therapy (DBT)
- family systems therapy
- group therapy
- neurofeedback
- psychodynamic therapy
- sensorimotor psychotherapy
- somatic experiencing
- yoga, specifically trauma-sensitive yoga
- psychedelic-assisted therapy (PAT)

== History ==
Judith Lewis Herman of Harvard University was the first psychiatrist and scholar to conceptualise complex post-traumatic stress disorder (C-PTSD) as a (new) mental health condition in 1992, within her book Trauma & Recovery and an accompanying article. In 1988, Herman suggested that a new diagnosis of complex post-traumatic stress disorder (C-PTSD) was needed to describe the symptoms and psychological and emotional effects of long-term trauma. Over the years, the definition of C-PTSD has shifted (including a proposal for DESNOS in DSM-IV and a diagnosis of EPCACE in ICD-10), with a different definition in the ICD-11 than per Dr. Herman's initial conceptualization. The ICD-11 definition of C-PTSD overlaps more with DSM-5 PTSD than earlier definitions of PTSD.

== Criticism ==
Though acceptance of the idea of complex PTSD has increased with mental health professionals, the research required for the proper validation of a new disorder was considered insufficient to include C-PTSD as a separate disorder in the DSM-IV and DSM-5. The disorder was proposed under the name DES-NOS (Disorder of Extreme Stress Not Otherwise Specified) for inclusion in the DSM-IV but was rejected by members of the Diagnostic and Statistical Manual of Mental Disorders (DSM) committee of the American Psychiatric Association for lack of sufficient diagnostic validity research. Chief among the stated limitations was a study which showed that 95% of individuals who could be diagnosed with the proposed DES-NOS were also diagnosable with PTSD, raising questions about the added usefulness of an additional disorder.

Following the failure of DES-NOS to gain formal recognition in the DSM-IV, the concept was re-packaged for children and adolescents and given a new name, developmental trauma disorder. Supporters of DTD appealed to the developers of the DSM-5 to recognize DTD as a new disorder. Just as the developers of DSM-IV refused to include DES-NOS, the developers of DSM-5 refused to include DTD due to a perceived lack of sufficient research.

One of the main justifications offered for this proposed disorder has been that the current system of diagnosing PTSD plus comorbid disorders does not capture the wide array of symptoms in one diagnosis. Because individuals who suffered repeated and prolonged traumas often show PTSD plus other concurrent psychiatric disorders, some researchers have argued that a single broad disorder such as C-PTSD provides a better and more parsimonious diagnosis than the current system of PTSD plus concurrent disorders. Conversely, an article published in BioMed Central has posited there is no evidence that being labeled with a single disorder leads to better treatment than being labeled with PTSD plus concurrent disorders.

Complex PTSD embraces a wider range of symptoms relative to PTSD, specifically emphasizing problems of emotional regulation, negative self-concept, and interpersonal problems. Diagnosing complex PTSD can imply that this wider range of symptoms is caused by traumatic experiences, rather than acknowledging any pre-existing experiences of trauma, which could lead to a higher risk of experiencing future traumas. It also asserts that this wider range of symptoms and higher risk of traumatization are related to hidden confounder variables, and there is no causal relationship between symptoms and trauma experiences. In the diagnosis of PTSD, the definition of the stressor event is limited to life-threatening or sexually violent events, with the implication that these are typically sudden and unexpected events. Complex PTSD vastly widened the definition of potential stressor events by calling them adverse events, and deliberately dropping reference to life-threatening, so that experiences can be included, such as neglect, emotional abuse, or living in a war zone, without having specifically experienced life-threatening events. By broadening the stressor criterion, an article published by the Child and Youth Care Forum claims this has led to confusing differences between competing definitions of complex PTSD, undercutting the clear operationalization of symptoms seen as one of the successes of the DSM.

== See also ==
- Adverse childhood experiences – Traumatic events that occur during childhood
- Attachment-based psychotherapy – Psychoanalytic psychotherapy based on attachment theory
- Attachment in adults – Application of the theory of attachment to adults
- Attachment in children – Biological instinct
- Ethical guidelines for treating trauma survivors – Medical guidelines
- Psychosomatic medicine – Interdisciplinary medical field exploring various influences on bodily processes
