= The Damned Ones =

2025 film by Reena Deen

- Directed by: Reena Deen
- Written by: Reena Deen
- Produced by: Reena Deen
- Starring: Jade Ow; Amanda Yip
- Production company: Parachute Pictures
- Release date: 2025
- Country: Singapore

The Damned Ones is a 2025 Singaporean supernatural mystery feature film, written, directed and produced by Reena Deen. The film stars Jade Ow and Amanda Yip, and is Singapore's first low-budget independent horror film with a disabled cast, and explores disability and disability representation.

== Cast ==
- Jade Ow as Laura Heng
- Amanda Yip as Siti Limento
- Mila Troncoso as Diya
- Michael J. Parks as Michael
- Elaine Siow as First Investigating Officer
- Mustafa Ali Khan as Inspector Arun
- Mai Youa Xiong as Inspector Ying
- Himanshu as Professor Cambly
- Vandana Tikku as TNU’s Dean
- Kelly as Laura Heng’s mother

== Production ==
The Damned Ones was written, directed and produced by Reena Deen, a former teacher turned filmmaker who lives with dyslexia and Complex post-traumatic stress disorder. Deen wanted to tell a story featuring a cast of disabled characters that did not revolve around disability. All the disabled characters in the film were played by disabled actors, and the crew was composed of disabled people and people from other marginalised communities. Deen used the Singaporean film club Kino Red Dot to find disabled cast and crew.

Jade Ow, an actress with moderate to severe hearing impairment, was the first person to come aboard on the project playing the lead character of Laura, a university student who becomes a suspect in her friend's disappearance. Ow then recommended her friend and fellow actress Amanda Yip, who has retinitis pigmentosa (progressive vision loss that affects the retina), who was then cast in the role of Siti, the missing woman. Michael J. Parks, who has disabilities affecting reading and memory, was assistant director and also played the role of Michael.

The film started shooting in Singapore in 2023. Filming was disrupted on several occasions due to extreme heat and humidity, and also due to rain storms.

Some of the dialogue was improvised, to help support the cast's access needs.

Shooting was completed in 2024, and in August 2024, post-production began with Parachute Pictures. The film was released in 2025.

== Reception ==
A short documentary on the making of The Damned Ones featuring footage from the film screened at the 2023 Iaminvisible Singapore film festival (held in November 2023), a film festival celebrating disabled filmmaking talent and disability representation within film. This documentary won a Commendation Award from Nee Soon Group Representation Constituency MP Louis Ng.

A second short documentary chronicling the cast and crew's journey in making the film screened at the 2023 Pokka Film Festival in Singapore, where it took third place, and was awarded $5000 by Pokka to offset post-production costs.
