= Counterconditioning =

Psychology concept

Counterconditioning (also called stimulus substitution) is a functional analytic principle that is part of behavior analysis, and involves the conditioning of an unwanted behavior or response to a stimulus into a wanted behavior or response by the association of positive actions with the stimulus. For example, when training a dog, a person would create a positive response by petting or calming the dog when the dog reacts anxiously or nervously to a stimulus. Therefore, this will associate the positive response with the stimulus.

== Founders ==
Mary Cover Jones was the first to show the effectiveness of the counter conditioning process in her rabbit experiments. She was able to eliminate the fear of rabbits from a young boy. The rabbit was first kept away from the boy and then moved closer and closer, while the boy was able to eat his favorite foods. The boy was allowed to touch the rabbit and then was able to eat his food to reduce the nervousness touching the rabbit induced. Eventually the boy was able to pet the rabbit without any sign of fear because of the unpleasant and feared stimulus of the rabbit was now replaced by the pleasant stimulus of the food. But Jones was not the only one working on this process of conditioning, John B. Watson and Rosalie Rayner suggested a process similar to that of Jones and also shortly after the rabbit experiments were published Ivan Pavlov used a similar procedure for a dog that was agitated by his experiments.

== Versus extinction ==
Counterconditioning is very similar to extinction seen in classical conditioning. It is the process of getting rid of an unwanted response. But in counterconditioning, the unwanted response does not just disappear, it is replaced by a new, wanted response. "The conditioned stimulus is presented with the unconditioned stimulus". This also can be thought of as stimulus substitution. The weaker stimulus will be replaced by the stronger stimulus. When counterconditioning is successful, the process can not just be explained by simply substitution of a stimulus. It usually is explained by things such as conditioned inhibition, habituation, or extinction.

== Common treatment uses ==
It is a common treatment for aggression, fears, and phobias. The use of counter conditioning is widely used for treatment in humans as well as animals. The most common goal is to decrease or increase the want or desire to the stimulus. One of the most widely used types of counter conditioning is systematic desensitization. This technique uses muscle relaxation instead of food as the positive counter stimulus. The main goal in this treatment is to reduce fear to a certain feared stimulus.

== Annotated bibliography ==
1. Richard J. Gerrig and Philip G. Zimbardo start to the explain the process of counter conditioning it their article. Explaining the process with people along with animals such as dogs.
2. Aaron E. Blaisdell, James C. Denniston, Hernan I. Savastano, and Ralph R. Miller were the authors of this article. This article explains the biological effects of conditioning and counter conditioning. They also show and explain the results of their experiments using the techniques of conditioning.
3. Edward W. Craighead and Charles B. Nemeroff go into much detail about counter conditioning. They explain the differences between classical conditioning and counter conditioning and also explain how counter conditioning works. Along with the explanation of the process they tell how the process came about and who did the experiments leading to counter conditioning's discovery.
