= Systematic desensitization =

Type of behavior therapy

Systematic desensitization is a form of exposure therapy used to treat phobias and anxiety disorders. Developed by psychiatrist Joseph Wolpe in the 1950s, it is based on the principle of reciprocal inhibition, which is the idea that anxiety and relaxation cannot coexist simultaneously. By repeatedly exposing a patient to an anxiety evoking stimulus while they experience a physiological state antagonistic to anxiety (such as relaxation), their fear-response to the stimulus should progressively decrease.

The goal of the therapy is for the individual to learn how to cope with and overcome their fear in each level of an exposure hierarchy. The process of systematic desensitization occurs in three steps. The first step is to identify the hierarchy of fears. The second step is to learn relaxation or coping techniques. Finally, the individual uses these techniques to manage their fear during a situation from the hierarchy. The third step is repeated for each level of the hierarchy, starting from the least fear-inducing situation.

== History ==
Emerging during the mid-20th century, Wolpe's work aligned with the rise of behaviorism in psychology and represented a shift from psychoanalysis. Rather than seeking to uncover the unconscious and root causes of anxiety disorders, systematic desensitization proposed that treatment should be more measurable, tangible and based on evidence.

In 1947, Wolpe discovered that the cats of Wits University could overcome their fears through gradual and systematic exposure. Wolpe studied Ivan Pavlov's work on artificial neuroses and the research done on elimination of children's fears by Watson and Jones. In 1958, Wolpe did a series of experiments on the artificial induction of neurotic disturbance in cats. He found that gradually deconditioning the neurotic animals was the best way to treat them of their neurotic disturbances. Wolpe deconditioned the neurotic cats through different feeding environments. Wolpe knew that this treatment of feeding would not generalize to humans and he instead substituted relaxation as a treatment to relieve the anxiety symptoms.

Wolpe found that if he presented a client with the actual anxiety inducing stimulus, the relaxation techniques did not work. It was difficult to bring all of the objects into his office because not all anxiety inducing stimuli are physical objects, but instead are concepts. Wolpe instead began to have his clients imagine the anxiety inducing stimulus or look at pictures of the anxiety inducing stimulus, much like the process that is done today.

== Applications and uses ==
=== Three steps of desensitization ===
There are three main steps that Wolpe identified to successfully desensitize an individual.

1. Establish anxiety stimulus hierarchy. The individual should first identify the items that are causing the anxiety problems. Each item that causes anxiety is given a subjective ranking on the severity of induced anxiety. If the individual is experiencing great anxiety to many different triggers, each item is dealt with separately. For each trigger or stimulus, a list is created to rank the events from least anxiety-provoking to most anxiety-provoking.
2. Learn the relaxation response. Relaxation training, such as meditation, is one type of best coping strategies. Wolpe taught his patients relaxation responses because it is not possible to be both relaxed and anxious at the same time. In this method, patients practice tensing and relaxing different parts of the body until the patient reaches a state of serenity. This is necessary because it provides the patient with a means of controlling their fear, rather than letting it increase to intolerable levels. Only a few sessions are needed for a patient to learn appropriate coping mechanisms. Additional coping strategies include anti-anxiety medicine and breathing exercises. Another example of relaxation is cognitive reappraisal of imagined outcomes. The therapist might encourage patients to examine what they imagine happening when exposed to the anxiety-inducing stimulus and then allowing for the client to replace the imagined catastrophic situation with any of the imagined positive outcomes.
3. Connect stimulus to the incompatible response or coping method by counter conditioning. In this step the client completely relaxes and is then presented with the lowest item that was placed on their hierarchy of severity of anxiety phobias. When the patient has reached a state of serenity again after being presented with the first stimuli, the second stimuli that should present a higher level of anxiety is presented. This will help the patient overcome their phobia. This activity is repeated until all the items of the hierarchy of severity anxiety is completed without inducing any anxiety in the client at all. If at any time during the exercise the coping mechanisms fail or became a failure, or the patient fails to complete the coping mechanism due to the severe anxiety, the exercise is then stopped. When the individual is calm, the last stimuli that is presented without inducing anxiety is presented again and the exercise is then continued depending on the patient outcomes.

=== Example ===
A client may approach a therapist due to their great phobia of snakes. This is how the therapist would help the client using the three steps of systematic desensitization:

1. Establish anxiety stimulus hierarchy. A therapist may begin by asking the patient to identify a fear hierarchy. This fear hierarchy would list the relative unpleasantness of various levels of exposure to a snake. For example, seeing a picture of a snake might elicit a low fear rating, compared to live snakes crawling on the individual—the latter scenario becoming highest on the fear hierarchy.
2. Learn coping mechanisms or incompatible responses. The therapist would work with the client to learn appropriate coping and relaxation techniques such as meditation and deep muscle relaxation responses.
3. Connect the stimulus to the incompatible response or coping method. The client would be presented with increasingly unpleasant levels of the feared stimuli, from lowest to highest—while utilizing the deep relaxation techniques (i.e. progressive muscle relaxation) previously learned. The imagined stimuli to help with a phobia of snakes may include: a picture of a snake; a small snake in a nearby room; a snake in full view; touching of the snake, etc. At each step in the imagined progression, the patient is desensitized to the phobia through exposure to the stimulus while in a state of relaxation. As the fear hierarchy is unlearned, anxiety gradually becomes extinguished.

=== Specific phobias ===
Specific phobias are one class of mental disorder often treated via systematic desensitization. When persons experience such phobias (for example fears of heights, dogs, snakes, closed spaces, etc.), they tend to avoid the feared stimuli; this avoidance, in turn, can temporarily reduce anxiety but is not necessarily an adaptive way of coping with it. In this regard, patients' avoidance behaviors can become reinforced – a concept defined by the tenets of operant conditioning. Thus, the goal of systematic desensitization is to overcome avoidance by gradually exposing patients to the phobic stimulus, until that stimulus can be tolerated. Wolpe found that systematic desensitization was successful 90% of the time when treating phobias.

=== Test anxiety ===
Between 25 and 40 percent of students experience test anxiety. Children can suffer from low self-esteem and stress-induced symptoms as a result of test anxiety. The principles of systematic desensitization can be used by children to help reduce their test anxiety. Children can practice the muscle relaxation techniques by tensing and relaxing different muscle groups. With older children and college students, an explanation of desensitization can help to increase the effectiveness of the process. After these students learn the relaxation techniques, they can create an anxiety inducing hierarchy. For test anxiety these items could include not understanding directions, finishing on time, marking the answers properly, spending too little time on tasks, or underperforming. Teachers, school counselors or school psychologists could instruct children on the methods of systematic desensitization.

== Use of technology in systematic desensitization ==
=== Virtual Reality Therapy (VRT) ===
Since Ivan Sutherland created the first virtual reality (VR) technology head-mounted display in 1965, these technologies have improved significantly to create realistic and immersive replicas of the environment. As a result, psychologists have begun to incorporate virtual reality in systematic desensitization. Virtual Reality Therapy (VRT) allows clinicians to expose patients to anxiety-provoking stimuli within a highly controlled and interactive digital environment.

In 1995, a case report conducted by Rothbaum et al. was the first to implement virtual reality when practicing systematic desensitization. The study focused on a 19-year-old student suffering from acrophobia and lasted 3 weeks. The results found virtual reality to be effective in treating the patient's fear of heights. Consequently, a larger study was conducted by the same researchers over an 8-week period, splitting a larger group of college students into control and treatment groups. The results again concluded that systematic desensitization through virtual reality was statistically significant in reducing fear of heights, this time on a larger scale.

=== Advantages ===
Since then, VR has been found to be an effective therapeutic tool for systematic desensitization, with studies implementing it to treat a range of conditions such as phobias, PTSD and anxiety disorders. In general, research has demonstrated that individuals tend to respond to virtual environments as though they were real, which emphasizes the ecological validity VRT provides as a therapeutic tool.

A key advantage of VRT is its ability to simulate a much wider range of environments. This allows scientists to work with scenarios that would otherwise be difficult, costly, or dangerous to recreate in the real-world. Furthermore, this provides clinicians with much greater control over potential confounding variables in the environment. For instance, although therapists are usually present during in-vivo exposure and can influence a patient, this is not the case when using VRT, allowing for greater immersion. Similarly, VRT can ensure replicability of the fear-inducing stimuli across control and treatment groups, allowing scientists to tailor exposure hierarchies with greater flexibility than using traditional methods.

=== Example ===
A modern application of VRT within systematic desensitization is in the treatment of Post-Traumatic Stress Disorder (PTSD). VRT is valuable for treating PTSD as some traumatic events cannot be recreated in a clinical setting. A randomized controlled trial by Beidel et al. involving 92 Iraq and Afghanistan veterans found significant reductions in PTSD symptoms across both treatment groups, with 65.9% of participants no longer meeting diagnostic criteria for PTSD after treatment. More recently, research has explored using VRT on a wider scale by tailoring treatment to specific populations and conflicts. For example, BraveMind is a VRT system which works on creating highly detailed customizable scenarios for war veterans. These tailored virtual environments are now being created internationally, such as with the Virtual Ukraine project, which addresses the specific experiences of soldiers and civilians affected by the ongoing conflict in Ukraine.

=== Limitations ===
Although VRT has led to promising findings, this form of therapy also comes with several limitations. First, early studies outlining its benefits such as Rothbaum et al. used small sample sizes of 20 participants, which limits the generalizability of their findings. More broadly, some studies have argued most existing research has low methodological quality which interferes with the reliability of results. Finally, practical barriers such as the cost of and access to VR equipment also present a challenge to implementing VRT on a wider scale.

== Limitations and criticisms ==
The main criticism studies have raised towards systematic desensitization emphasize flaws in Wolpe's original theory and overarching practical limitations; some research has suggested relaxation and fear hierarchy are not as important as Wolpe originally suggested. More generally, these weaknesses mean systematic desensitization is being used less frequently and new models are progressively being implemented.

=== Theoretical criticisms ===
A major criticism regards relaxation and its importance in minimising fear response. Although Wolpe highlighted relaxation as critical for reciprocal-inhibition and thus systematic desensitization, studies have found conflicting results regarding its importance. Research has indicated that desensitization conducted alongside relaxation exercises is often equally effective to desensitization without relaxation. In further contradiction to Wolpe, some studies have demonstrated beginning exposure with items at the top of the fear hierarchy produces comparable and sometimes better outcomes than starting with the least anxiety-provoking stimuli.

As a result, alternative theoretical models have been proposed to better account for the mechanisms of exposure therapy. For instance, these include Foa and Kozak's emotional processing theory and Craske et al.'s inhibitory learning model. The development of these alternative frameworks underlines how Wolpe's original reciprocal inhibition model may be insufficient in fully explaining why and how systematic desensitization works.

=== Practical limitations ===
Systematic desensitization has also been criticized for being time-consuming and reliant on the patient's capacity for imagination. For example, in patients with severe phobias, completing the process usually requires multiple sessions, sometimes requiring over 10. Additionally, as the technique relies on the patient's ability to imagine anxiety-provoking situations, it may be less effective for individuals who struggle with mental visualization such as those struggling with aphantasia. However, the development of VRT has been proposed as one means of addressing this limitation.

More generally, Wolpe's theory has been criticized from a psychoanalytical standpoint for addressing the symptoms of anxiety rather than its underlying causes, which has been argued to limit long-term effectiveness of treatment. Finally, while systematic desensitization has appeared effective for phobias and anxiety, it has been reported as unsuccessful when treating individuals suffering from more serious conditions such as schizophrenia. This suggests the therapy's efficacy varies depending on the nature of the condition being treated.

=== Decline in clinical use ===
In recent decades, systematic desensitization has become less commonly used as a treatment of choice for anxiety disorders. Since 1970 academic research on systematic desensitization has declined, and the current focus has been on other therapies. Additionally, the number of clinicians using systematic desensitization has also declined since 1980, remaining in use primarily by clinicians trained prior to 1986. The decrease of systematic desensitization by practicing psychologist can be attributed to the increasing commonality of other techniques such as flooding, implosive therapy, and participant modeling.

== See also ==
- Flooding (psychology)
- Immersion therapy
- Sensitization
