= Subjective units of distress scale =

Scale in psychology

- Synonyms: Subjective Units of Disturbance Scale
- Purpose: evaluate progress of treatment

A Subjective Units of Distress Scale (SUDS, also called Subjective Units of Disturbance Scale) is a scale ranging from 0 to 10 measuring the subjective intensity of disturbance or distress currently experienced by an individual. Respondents provide a self report of where they are on the scale. The SUDS may be used as a benchmark for a professional or observer to evaluate the progress of treatment. In desensitization-based therapies, such as those listed below, the patients' regular self assessments enable them to guide the clinician repeatedly as part of the therapeutic dialog.

The SUD-level was developed by Joseph Wolpe in 1969. It has been used in cognitive-behavioral treatments for anxiety disorders (e.g. exposure practices and hierarchy) and for research purposes.

There is no hard and fast rule by which a patient can self assign a SUDS rating to his or her disturbance or distress, hence the name subjective.

Some guidelines are:

- The intensity recorded must be as it is experienced now.
- Constriction or congestion or tensing of body parts indicates a higher SUDS than that reported.

== Utility does not require precision ==
In using SUDS in a therapeutic setting, the therapist does not necessarily define the scale, because one of the benefits of asking a patient or client for a SUDS score is that it is simple. They might ask the client, "On a scale of zero to ten, where zero is no disturbance or neutral and ten is the highest disturbance you can imagine, how disturbing does the incident feel to you right now?"

The purpose of this question is to enable the patient or client to notice improvements, and the inherent difference between one person's subjective scale and another person's is irrelevant to therapy with either individual. Our brains are sophisticated enough that they can usually summarize a large amount of data very quickly, and often accurately.

There is a possibility that in some forms of therapy, the patient will want to see progress and will therefore report progress that isn't objectively present—a type one error from a statistical point of view. While both type I and type II errors are important in research situations, type one errors can have a therapeutic utility in clinical situations, in which they can provide an indirect opportunity for positive autosuggestion—much like the indirect suggestions employed in Eriksonian hypnosis.

Thus, since the main use of SUDS is for clinical purposes, rather than research purposes, the imprecise nature of the scale is relatively unimportant to its main users: patients and clinicians.
