= Immersion therapy =

Overcoming fears through confrontation

Immersion therapy is a psychological technique which allows a patient to overcome fears (phobias), but can be used for anxiety and panic disorders.

== Details ==
First a fear-hierarchy is created: the patient is asked a series of questions to determine the level of discomfort the fear causes in various conditions. Can the patient talk about the object of their fear, can the patient tolerate a picture of it or watch a movie which has the object of their fear, can they be in the same room with the object of their fear, and/or can they be in physical contact with it?

Once these questions have been ordered beginning with least discomfort to most discomfort, the patient is taught a relaxation exercise. Such an exercise might be tensing all the muscles in the patient's body then relaxing them and saying "relax", and then repeating this process until the patient is calm.

Next, the patient is exposed to the object of their fear in a condition with which they are most comfortable - such as merely talking about the object of their fear. Then, while in such an environment, the patient performs the relaxation exercise until they are comfortable at that level.

After that, the patient moves up the hierarchy to the next condition, such as a picture or movie of the object of fear, and then to the next level in the hierarchy and so on until the patient is able to cope with the fear directly.

This specific therapy can create a safe space, where individuals are able to become comfortable with their fears, anxieties or traumatic experiences. One may say it is linked to exposure, as the patient is immersed into an experience until they eventually become much more relaxed in it.

Although it may take several sessions to achieve a resolution, the technique is regarded as successful. Many research studies are being conducted in regard to achieving immersion therapy goals in a virtual computer based program, although results are not conclusive.

'Immersive therapy through virtual reality represents a novel strategy used in psychological interventions, but there is still a need to strengthen the evidence on its effects on health professionals' mental health' (Linares-Chamorro et al., 2022).

== Virtual therapy ==
As mentioned previously, Immersion Therapy can occur in the form of a virtual reality (VR) therapy. This usually involves transporting the user to a simulated environment, creating a realistic real life setting, and combining video, audio, haptic and motion sensory input to create an immersive experience. Virtual therapy may use videos in either a 2D or 3D immersion using a head-mounted display (Hodges et al., 2002).

There have been many studies looking at this type of therapy and combatting anxiety and phobias, such as acrophobia. It assesses a patient's cognitive, emotional and physiological functioning. It can be useful for both prevention and treatment of psychiatric conditions. This method goes beyond the simple exposure therapy, as it can be a more comprehensive treatment compared to other interventions. A study conducted in Olot, Spain aimed to look at levels of anxiety and the wellbeing of female hospital staff. A sample size of 35 female health professionals undertook immersive therapy for 8 weeks. The way the anxiety levels were measured was through the Hamilton scale and well-being through the Eudemon scale. This specific immersive therapy was executed through Virtual Reality, in which the VR experience used a projection device with light and sound control that provided an immersive experience, creating an environment that enhanced self awareness to approach anxiety management. Results suggested that a significant improvement was found in anxiety and wellbeing, both statistically and clinically.

Another study in the UK looking at helping acrophobia. Researchers recruited 100 adults with a fear of heights, if they scored more than 29 on the heights interpretation questionnaire, suggested they had a fear of heights. Participants were randomly allocated by computer to either an automated VR delivered in roughly six 30 minute sessions, administered about 2-3 times a week over 2 weeks and a control group was present which received no treatment. The virtual coach worked alongside the VR programmed and would mention things like "We're discovering what happens when we venture into a situation we'd normally try to avoid." The aim of the virtual coach was to put the participants' expectations to the test and experiencing citations where they would usually feel anxious. Then the tasks began, where they underwent different levels of heights in different activities. Overall, participants in the control group compared to the VR group had reduced fear of heights by the end of the treatment.

Although, this is evidence to suggest how virtual computer based immersion therapy works, the research within this area of Psychology is scare, thus more testing needs to occur, to fully implement this type of technology.

=== Advantages ===
Immersive virtual reality may be identified as something that is a potentially revolutionary tool for psychological treatment of mental disorders, which may gradually be adopted in regular clinical practice in the coming years. (Geraets et al., 2021). Virtual reality has significantly been evolving over the last few years due to many advancements in technology, thus enabling us to understand the constant need for new research to take place.

The benefits of Immersive virtual reality therapy could significantly enhance effective psychological interventions. Treatments can be given automatically, without a therapist's physical presence, resulting in a more low cost route. Another benefit of VR is that it can offer 'direct therapeutic intervention', which is often lacking in conventional clinical settings, allowing for treatments to be delivered faster and more efficiently. Patients can be placed in simulated environments whilst wearing a VR headset, teaching them how to react more effectively. Additionally, patients are more open to experimenting with new therapies because they are aware they are in a secure stimulation setting, in which the exposure to the stimuli can occur in different stages and not just one go.

VR has been used successfully over the past 25 years for assessment, understanding, and treatment of mental health disorders.The increased accessibility and affordability of VR mean that this technique is now ready to move from specialist laboratories into clinics (Freeman et al., 2018).

Immersive therapy can provide a distinctive and engaging experience that allows for overcoming fears, gaining self-confidence and creating coping strategies. It allows people to experience real life situations in a controlled and safe setting. It is much more interactive and rather than just talking about their phobia or anxiety, they can actually relive it but overcome it too, generating a greater sense of self-confidence, reducing the feelings of anxieties and managing their feelings during stressful situations.

== See also ==
- Flooding (psychology)
- Exposure therapy
