= Edna Foa =

Israeli psychologist (1937–2026)

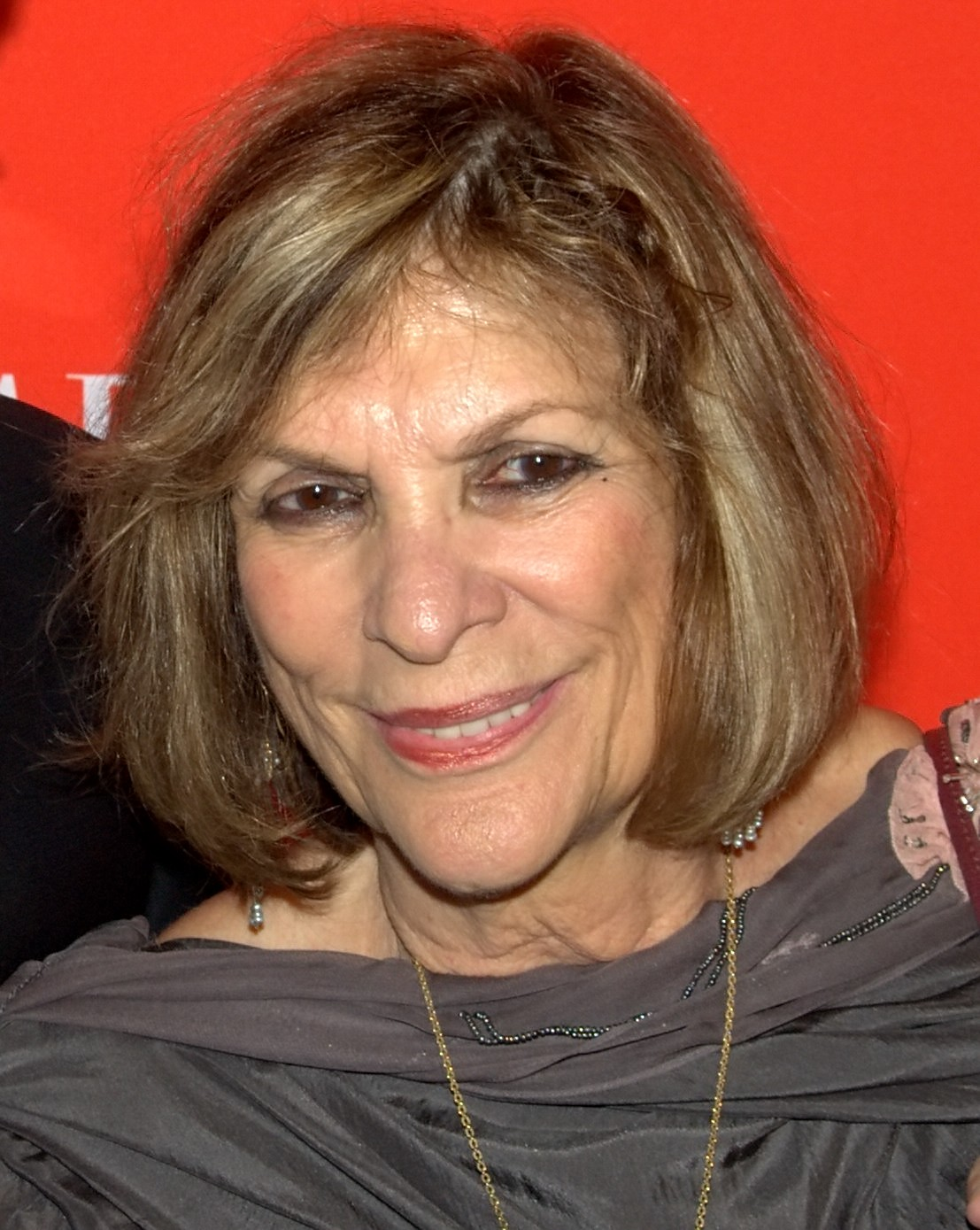
Foa in 2010

Edna Ben Jacob Foa (Hebrew: עדנה פואה; 28 December 1937 – 24 March 2026) was an Israeli professor of clinical psychology at the University of Pennsylvania, where she served as the director of the Center for the Treatment and Study of Anxiety. Foa was an authority in the field of psychopathology and treatment of anxiety. She approached the understanding and treatment of mental disorders from a cognitive-behavioral perspective.

== Life and career ==
Foa was born on 28 December 1937 to a Jewish family in Haifa in what is now Israel. She earned her BA in psychology and literature from Bar Ilan University in 1962, and her MA in clinical psychology from the University of Illinois in 1970. In that same year she completed her PhD in clinical psychology and personality at the University of Missouri.

Her research, aimed at determining causes and treatments of anxiety disorders, has been highly influential. Foa was an expert in post-traumatic stress disorders (PTSD) and obsessive-compulsive disorder (OCD). The program she developed for rape survivors is considered to be one of the most effective therapies for PTSD. She published several books and over 200 articles and book chapters, lectured extensively around the world, and was the chair of the PTSD work group of the DSM-IV.

Foa's research interests were in the development and evaluation of cognitive-behavioral treatment for obsessive compulsive disorder (OCD), post-traumatic stress disorder (PTSD), and social anxiety disorder (SAD); experimental psychopathology of anxiety disorders, especially post-traumatic stress disorder, social phobia, and obsessive-compulsive disorder; and dissemination of evidence-based treatment to mental health professionals.

== Death ==
Foa died in Philadelphia on 24 March 2026, at the age of 88.

== Awards and honours ==
Foa is the recipient of numerous awards and honors, including:

- Time magazine's 100 Most Influential People in the World for 2010
- Award for Lifetime Achievement in the field of Trauma Psychology from the Trauma division of the American Psychological Association
- Distinguished Scientific Contribution Award from the Board of Scientific Affairs of the American Psychological Association
- The First Outstanding Research Contribution Award from the Association for the Advancement of Behavior Therapy (now the Association for Behavioral and Cognitive Therapies)
- Lifetime Achievement award from the Association for Behavioral and Cognitive Therapies
- Lifetime Achievement Award from the International Society for Traumatic Stress Studies
- Exemplary Contribution to the Field of Psychology and Humanity Philadelphia Society of Clinical Psychologists
- Exemplary Substance Abuse Prevention Program Award from the Substance Abuse and Mental Health Services Administration
- Annual Signature Service Award from Women Organized Against Rape
- Carol Johnson Humanitarian award from Women Organized Against Rape
- Honorary Doctorate from Faculty of Psychology, University of Basel
- The Philadelphia Behavior Therapy Association (PBTA) Lifetime Achievement Award

== See also ==
- Prolonged exposure therapy
