= Prolonged exposure therapy =

Therapy designed to treat PTSD

Prolonged exposure therapy (PE) is a form of behavior therapy and cognitive behavioral therapy designed to treat post-traumatic stress disorder. It is characterized by two main treatment procedures – imaginal and in vivo exposures. Imaginal exposure is repeated 'on-purpose' retelling of the trauma memory. In vivo exposure is gradually confronting situations, places, and things that are reminders of the trauma or feel dangerous (despite being objectively safe). Additional procedures include processing of the trauma memory and breathing retraining.

== Overview ==
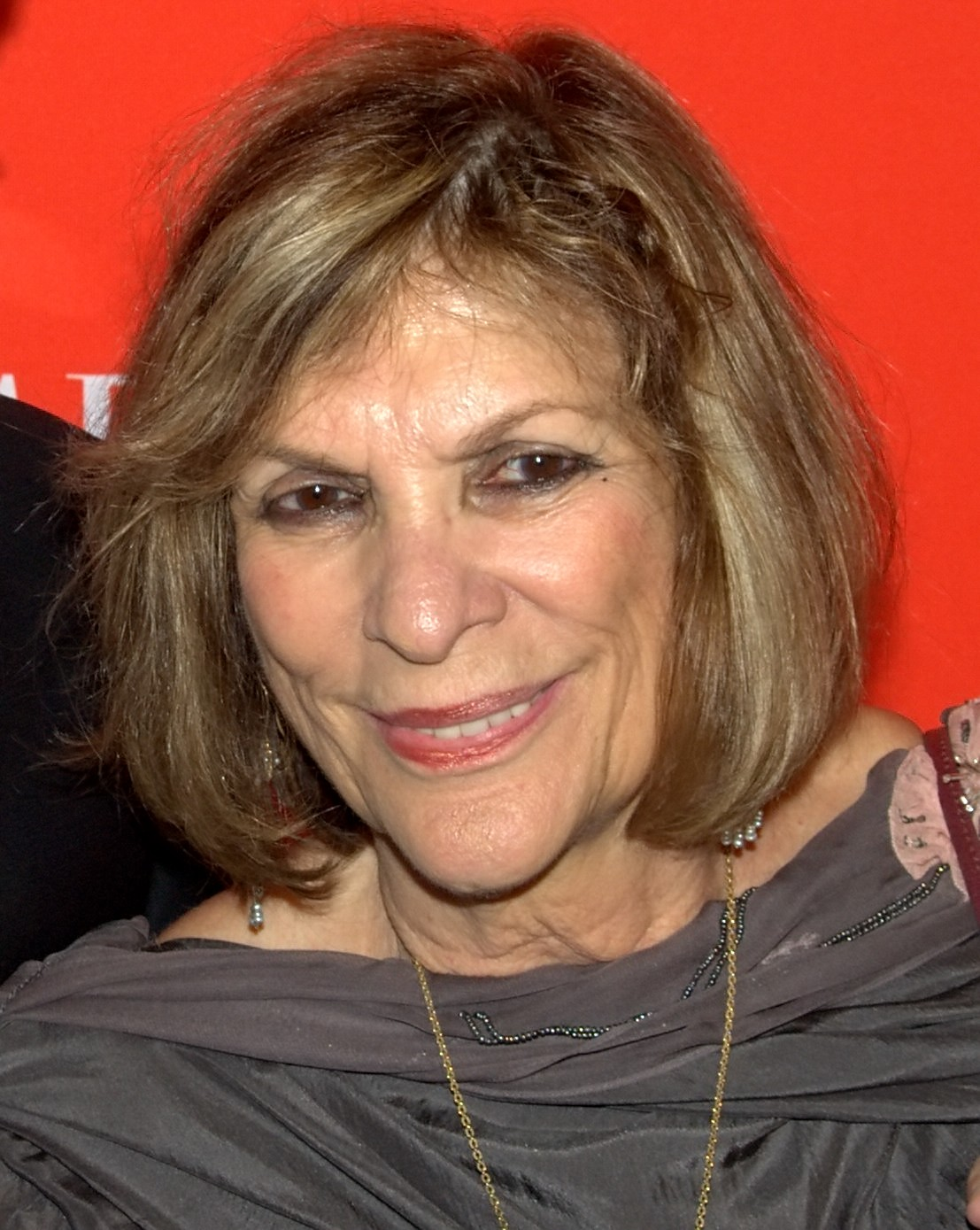
Edna B Foa

Prolonged exposure therapy was developed by Edna B Foa, Director of the Center for the Treatment and Study of Anxiety at the University of Pennsylvania. Prolonged exposure therapy (PE) is a theoretically based, and is posited to be, a highly effective treatment for chronic post-traumatic stress disorder (PTSD) and related depression, anxiety, and anger. PE falls under the category of "exposure-based therapy" and is supported by scientific studies which reflect its positive impact on patient symptoms.

Exposure-based therapies focus on confronting the harmless cues/triggers of trauma/stress in order to unpair them from the feelings of anxiety and stress. Prolonged exposure is a flexible therapy that can be modified to fit the needs of individual clients. It is specifically designed to help clients psychologically process traumatic events and reduce trauma-induced psychological disturbances. Prolonged exposure produces clinically significant improvement in 40–75% of patients with chronic PTSD, with the only reliable predictor of treatment outcomes being pre-treatment chronic PTSD symptom severity.

Prolonged exposure is rooted in the theory of emotional processing, in which new, accurate information challenges previously learned fear structures and modifies them in such a way that the new, accurate information is more readily retrieved. With PTSD, it is thought that traumatic events cause inaccurate associations to develop, between stimuli and responses from the event. These inaccurate associations lead to avoidance of trauma-related stimuli, which acts as a barrier to emotional processing. However, little social commentary is available on the effects of repeatedly exposing trauma victims to trauma instead of changing the circumstances which led to the victims' trauma in the first place.

Over years of testing and development, prolonged exposure has evolved into an adaptable program of intervention to address the needs of varied trauma survivors.

In 2001, Prolonged Exposure for PTSD received an Exemplary Substance Abuse Prevention Program Award from the U.S. Department of Health and Human Services Substance Abuse and Mental Health Services Administration (SAMHSA). Prolonged exposure was selected by SAMHSA and the Center for Substance Abuse Prevention as a Model Program for national dissemination.

== Components ==
PTSD is characterized by the re-experiencing of the traumatic event through intrusive and upsetting memories, nightmares, flashbacks, and strong emotional and physiological reactions triggered by reminders of the trauma. Most individuals with PTSD try to ward off the intrusive symptoms and avoid the trauma-reminders, even when those reminders are not inherently dangerous. To address the traumatic memories and triggers that are reminders of the trauma, the core components of exposure programs for the disorder are:

1. Imaginal exposure, revisiting the traumatic memory, repeated recounting it aloud, and processing the revisiting experience
2. In vivo exposure, the repeated confrontation with situations and objects that cause distress but are not inherently dangerous

The goal of this treatment is to promote processing of the trauma memory and to reduce distress and avoidance evoked by the trauma reminders. Additionally, individuals with emotional numbing and depression are encouraged to engage in enjoyable activities, even if these activities do not cause fear or anxiety but have dropped out the person's life due to loss of interest.

The imaginal exposure typically occurs during the therapy session and consists of retelling the trauma to the therapist. For the in vivo exposure, the clinician works with the client to establish a fear and avoidance hierarchy and typically assigns exposures to these list items as homework progressively. The therapist may also record the session and ask the patient to continue to complete in vivo exercises on their own time with the help of the recording. Both components work by facilitating emotional processing so that the problematic traumatic memories and avoidances habituate (desensitize) and are better tolerated. Randomized control trials reflect that only 10–38% of PTSD patients who take part in PE therapy terminate treatment before their program is complete (generally after at least eight sessions).

== Studies ==
Practitioners throughout the United States and many other countries currently use prolonged exposure to successfully treat survivors of varied traumas including rape, assault, child abuse, combat, motor vehicle accidents, and disasters. Prolonged exposure has been beneficial for those with co-occurring PTSD and substance abuse when combined with substance abuse treatment. Studies have also reflected that prolonged exposure therapy aids patients who have both PTSD and borderline personality disorder when the treatment is coupled with dialectical behavior therapy. Some were concerned that PE would negatively affect the treatment of patients with substance abuse disorder (SUD) as purposefully and intentionally exposing them to their reminders and triggers may worsen their state; however, randomized control trial studies exist which indicate that there are no negative effects of using PE for patients with SUD. Conducted studies have reflected positively on the effectiveness of PE. For example, in the Netherlands, patients responded better to PE than to eye movement desensitization and reprocessing (EMDR) treatment. 6 month follow ups revealed that PE had also lessened psychotic and schizophrenic issues. Furthermore, the symptoms of a small group of female methadone users in Israel had decreased after PE treatment. PE therapy was also found to be superior to supportive therapy in female veterans with PTSD in a randomized controlled trial.

== See also ==
- Post-traumatic stress disorder
- Exposure therapy
- Behavior therapy
- Cognitive behavioral therapy
- Edna B. Foa
- Barbara Rothbaum
