= Flooding (psychology) =

Form of behavior therapy

Flooding, sometimes referred to as in vivo exposure therapy, is a form of behavior therapy and desensitization – or exposure therapy – based on the principles of respondent conditioning. As a psychotherapeutic technique, it is used to treat phobia and anxiety disorders including post-traumatic stress disorder. It works by exposing the patient to their painful memories, with the goal of reintegrating their repressed emotions with their current awareness. Flooding was invented by psychologist Thomas Stampfl in 1967. It is still used in behavior therapy today.

Flooding is a psychotherapeutic method for overcoming phobias. In order to demonstrate the irrationality of the fear, a psychologist would put a person in a situation where they would face their phobia. Under controlled conditions and using psychologically-proven relaxation techniques, the subject attempts to replace their fear with relaxation. The experience can often be traumatic for a person, but may be necessary if the phobia is causing them significant life disturbances. The advantage to flooding is that it is quick and usually effective. There is, however, a possibility that a fear may spontaneously recur. This can be made less likely with systematic desensitization, another form of a classical condition procedure for the elimination of phobias.

== Functioning ==
"Flooding" works on the principles of classical conditioning or respondent conditioning—a form of Pavlov's classical conditioning—where patients change their behaviors to avoid negative stimuli. According to Pavlov, people can learn through associations, so if one has a phobia, it is because one associates the feared stimulus with a negative outcome.

Flooding uses a technique based on Pavlov's classical conditioning that uses exposure. There are different forms of exposure, such as imaginal exposure, virtual reality exposure, and in vivo exposure. While systematic desensitization may use these other types of exposure, flooding uses in vivo exposure, actual exposure to the feared stimulus. A patient is confronted with a situation in which the stimulus that provoked the original trauma is present. The psychologist there usually offers very little assistance or reassurance other than to help the patient to use relaxation techniques in order to calm themselves. Relaxation techniques such as progressive muscle relaxation are common in these kinds of classical conditioning procedures. The theory is that the adrenaline and fear response has a time limit, so a person should eventually have to calm down and realize that their phobia is unwarranted. Flooding can be done through the use of virtual reality and has been shown to be fairly effective in patients with flight phobia.

Psychiatrist Joseph Wolpe (1973) carried out an experiment which demonstrated flooding. He took a girl who was scared of cars, and drove her around for hours. Initially the girl was panicky but she eventually calmed down when she realized that her situation was safe. From then on she associated a sense of ease with cars. Psychologist Aletha Solter used flooding successfully with a 5-month-old infant who showed symptoms of post-traumatic stress following surgery.

Flooding therapy is not for every individual, and the therapist will discuss with the patient the levels of anxiety they are prepared to endure during the session. It may also be true that exposure is not for every therapist and therapists seem to shy away from use of the technique.

== In popular culture ==
American Slowcore band Flooding took their name from this practice.

== See also ==
- Attachment therapy, a controversial autism treatment intended to induce long-term behavioral compliance in children by combining nonconsensual flooding and sensory-overload techniques with the traumatic bonding relationship also manifested in Stockholm syndrome
- Behavior modification
- Desensitization (psychology)
- Habituation
- Immersion therapy
- Punishment
- Sensitization
- Systematic desensitization
