= Narrative exposure therapy =

Short-term therapy for trauma-related disorders

Narrative Exposure Therapy (NET) is a short-term psychotherapy used for the treatment of post-traumatic stress disorder and other trauma-related mental disorders. It creates a written account of the traumatic experiences of a patient or group of patients, with the aim of recapturing self-respect and acknowledging the patient's value. NET is an individual treatment, NETfacts is a format for communities.

NET was created in Germany in the early 2000s.

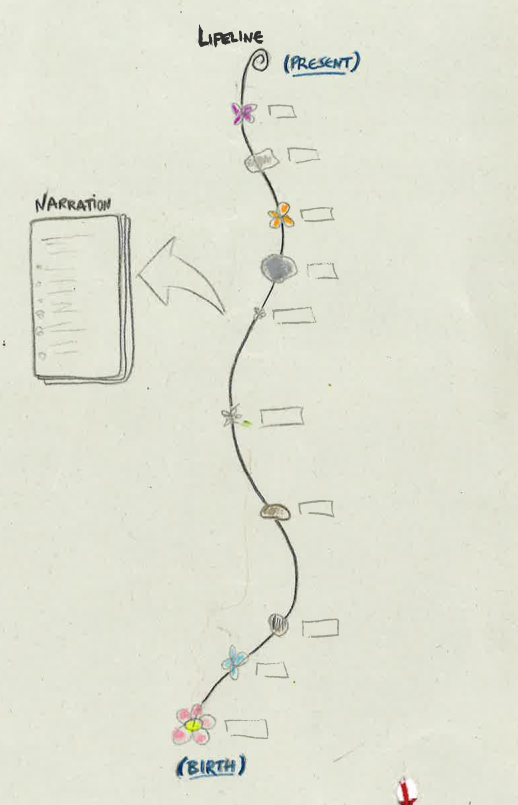
Key elements of NET: the lifeline and narration

== Key elements ==
=== Lifeline ===
NET is conducted around the use of the lifeline, which serves as a reference point for both the therapist and the patient during the therapy.

Creating a lifeline occurs during the first session A lifeline is a physical representation of one's life; therefore, different symbols are used to reconstitute the patient's lifeline, especially flowers and stones. Flowers represent good/positive events, whereas stones represent the bad/negative events of the patient's life. Symbols' size, shape, and color may also be used to indicate events with greater or lesser intensity or significance. It is up to the patient to decide on placing and choosing these symbols to reconstitute their lifeline. The largest stones are then chosen to be dealt with since they represent the greatest traumas the patient needs to reprocess or overcome. Building a lifeline can also help strengthen the therapeutic relationship and create an estimation of the number of sessions a patient may need.

=== Narration ===
Narrations are a product of the therapy. In the end of a therapy, the narration is read and given to the patient. It is supposed to be a representative summary of the patient's life, even including some details. Narrations are expected to be taken by the patient to help them overcome their trauma and mental problems. Narrations are helpful for the patient to re-process their memories of the past, particularly the trauma, and reorganize their thoughts; which should ultimately reduce the recurrence of bad memories that are responsible for the suffering of to the patient.

== Adaptations ==
- NET: aimed at a general public
- KidNET: aimed at children and adolescents
- FORNET: aimed at perpetrators
- MBNET: aimed at complex interpersonal trauma (combining theory of mind with NET)

== Efficacy ==
Studies have shown NET to reduce symptoms of post-traumatic stress disorder and depression, but few comparisons have been made to other available treatments.

It is conditionally recommended for treatment of PTSD by the American Psychological Association.

== See also ==
- Cognitive behavioral therapy
- Psychological trauma
- Exposure therapy
