= Extinction (psychology) =

Fading of non-reinforced conditioned response over time

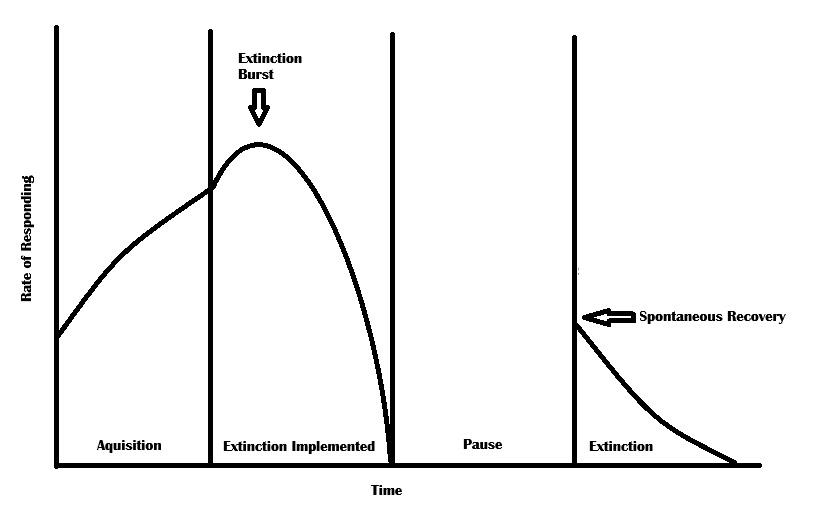
An example of an extinction curve

Extinction in psychology refers to the gradual decrease and possible elimination of a learned behavior. This behavioral phenomenon can be observed in both operantly conditioned and classically conditioned behavior. When operant behavior that has been previously reinforced no longer produces reinforcing consequences, the behavior gradually returns to operant levels (to the frequency of the behavior previous to learning, which may or may not be zero).

In classical conditioning, when a conditioned stimulus is presented alone, so that it no longer predicts the coming of the unconditioned stimulus, conditioned responding gradually stops. For example, after Pavlov's dog was conditioned to salivate at the sound of a metronome, it eventually stopped salivating to the metronome after the metronome had been sounded repeatedly but no food came.

In operant conditioning, when a conditioned response is no longer reinforced, the rate of conditioned responding decreases. An example of this would be when a child misbehaves to gain attention. When attention is no longer provided for the misbehavior, the misbehavior will decrease or cease.

Many anxiety disorders such as post-traumatic stress disorder are believed to reflect, at least in part, a failure to extinguish conditioned fear.

== Theories ==
Previously, the dominant account of extinction involved associative models, but with debate over whether extinction involved simply "unlearning" the unconditional stimulus (US) – Conditional stimulus (CS) association (e.g., the Rescorla–Wagner account) or, alternatively, a "new learning" of an inhibitory association that masked the original excitatory association (e.g., Konorski, Pearce and Hall account). A third account concerned non-associative mechanisms such as habituation, modulation and response fatigue. Myers & Davis reviewed fear extinction in rodents and suggested that multiple mechanisms may be at work depending on the timing and circumstances in which the extinction occurs.

Given the competing views and difficult observations for the various accounts researchers had turned to investigations at the cellular level (most often in rodents) to tease apart the specific brain mechanisms of extinction, in particular the role of the brain structures (amygdala, hippocampus, the prefrontal cortex), and specific neurotransmitter systems (e.g., GABA, NMDA). A study in rodents by Amano, Unal and Paré published in Nature Neuroscience found that extinction of a conditioned fear response was correlated with synaptic inhibition in the fear output neurons of the central amygdala that project to the periaqueductal gray that controls freezing behavior. They infer that inhibition derives from the ventromedial prefrontal cortex and suggest promising targets at the cellular level for new treatments of anxiety.

== Classical conditioning ==
Learning extinction can also occur in a classical conditioning paradigm. In this model, a neutral cue or context can come to elicit a conditioned response when it is paired with an unconditioned stimulus. An unconditioned stimulus is one that naturally and automatically triggers a certain behavioral response. A certain stimulus or environment can become a conditioned cue or a conditioned context, respectively, when paired with an unconditioned stimulus. An example of this process is a fear conditioning paradigm using a mouse. In this instance, a tone paired with a mild foot shock can become a conditioned cue, eliciting a fear response when presented alone in the future. In the same way, the context in which a foot shock is received such as a chamber with certain dimensions and a certain odor can elicit the same fear response when the mouse is placed back in that chamber in the absence of the foot shock.

In this paradigm, extinction occurs when the animal is re-exposed to the conditioned cue or conditioned context in the absence of the unconditioned stimulus. As the animal learns that the cue or context no longer predicts the coming of the unconditioned stimulus, conditioned responding gradually decreases, or extinguishes.

== Operant conditioning ==
In the operant conditioning paradigm, extinction refers to the process of no longer providing the reinforcement that has been maintaining a behavior. Operant extinction differs from forgetting in that the latter refers to a decrease in the strength of a behavior over time when it has not been emitted. For example, a child who climbs under his desk, a response which has been reinforced by attention, is subsequently ignored until the attention-seeking behavior no longer occurs. In his autobiography, B. F. Skinner noted how he accidentally discovered the extinction of an operant response due to the malfunction of his laboratory equipment:

My first extinction curve showed up by accident. A rat was pressing the lever in an experiment on satiation when the pellet dispenser jammed. I was not there at the time, and when I returned I found a beautiful curve. The rat had gone on pressing although no pellets were received. ... The change was more orderly than the extinction of a salivary reflex in Pavlov's setting, and I was terribly excited. It was a Friday afternoon and there was no one in the laboratory whom I could tell. All that weekend I crossed streets with particular care and avoided all unnecessary risks to protect my discovery from loss through my accidental death.

When the extinction of a response has occurred, the discriminative stimulus is then known as an extinction stimulus (SΔ or S-delta). When an S-delta is present, the reinforcing consequence which characteristically follows a behavior does not occur. This is the opposite of a discriminative stimulus, which is a signal that reinforcement will occur. For instance, in an operant conditioning chamber, if food pellets are only delivered when a response is emitted in the presence of a green light, the green light is a discriminative stimulus. If when a red light is present. food will not be delivered, then the red light is an extinction stimulus. (Food is used here as an example of a reinforcer.) However, some make the distinction between extinction stimuli and "S-Delta" due to the behavior not having a reinforcement history, i.e. in an array of three items (phone, pen, paper) "Which one is the phone" the "pen" and "paper" will not produce a response in the teacher, but is not technically extinction on the first trial due to selecting "pen" or "paper", missing a reinforcement history. This still would be considered as S-Delta.

== Extinction related phenomena ==
=== Spontaneous recovery ===
When a behavior reappears again after it has gone through extinction, it is called spontaneous recovery. It (extinction) is the result of challenging behavior(s) no longer occurring without the need for reinforcement. If there is a relapse and reinforcements are given, the problem behavior will return.

=== Extinction burst ===
While extinction, when implemented consistently over time, results in the eventual decrease of the undesired behavior, in the short term the subject might exhibit what is called an extinction burst. An extinction burst will often occur when the extinction procedure has just begun. This usually consists of a sudden and temporary increase in the response's frequency, followed by the eventual decline and extinction of the behavior targeted for elimination. Novel behavior, or emotional responses or aggressive behavior, may also occur.

For example, a pigeon has been reinforced to peck an electronic button. During its training history, every time the pigeon pecked the button, it will have received a small amount of bird seed as a reinforcer. Thus, whenever the bird is hungry, it will peck the button to receive food. However, if the button were to be turned off, the hungry pigeon will first try pecking the button just as it has in the past. When no food is forthcoming, the bird will likely try repeatedly. After a period of frantic activity, in which their pecking behavior yields no result, the pigeon's pecking will decrease in frequency.

Although not explained by reinforcement theory, the extinction burst can be understood using control theory. In perceptual control theory, the degree of output involved in any action is proportional to the discrepancy between the reference value (desired rate of reward in the operant paradigm) and the current input. Thus, when reward is removed, the discrepancy increases, and the output is increased. In the long term, 'reorganization', the learning algorithm of control theory, would adapt the control system such that output is reduced.

The evolutionary advantage of this extinction burst is clear. In a natural environment, an animal that persists in a learned behavior, despite not resulting in immediate reinforcement, might still have a chance of producing reinforcing consequences if the animal tries again. This animal would be at an advantage over another animal that gives up too easily.

Despite the name, however, not every explosive reaction to adverse stimuli subsides to extinction. Indeed, a small minority of individuals persist in their reaction indefinitely.

=== Extinction-induced variability ===
Extinction-induced variability serves an adaptive role similar to the extinction burst. When extinction begins, subjects can exhibit variations in response topography (the movements involved in the response). Response topography is always somewhat variable due to differences in environment or idiosyncratic causes but normally a subject's history of reinforcement keeps slight variations stable by maintaining successful variations over less successful variations. Extinction can increase these variations significantly as the subject attempts to acquire the reinforcement that previous behaviors produced. If a person attempts to open a door by turning the knob, but is unsuccessful, they may next try jiggling the knob, pushing on the frame, knocking on the door or other behaviors to get the door to open. Extinction-induced variability can be used in shaping to reduce problematic behaviors by reinforcing desirable behaviors produced by extinction-induced variability.

== Extinction procedures and interventions ==
Extinction is primarily implemented as an intervention in classrooms, exposure therapy, and through Applied Behavioral Analysis (ABA).

In order for extinction to work effectively, the intervention must be done consistently. Extinction is considered successful when responding in the presence of an extinction stimulus (a teacher not giving a misbehaving student attention, for instance) is zero. When implementing extinction interventions, the function of the target behavior should be considered. For example, an attention oriented extinction intervention (planned ignoring) may not work on a behavior that is actually reinforced by sensory stimulus or escape.

Extinction can be a long process; therefore, it requires that the facilitator of the procedure be completely invested from beginning to end in order for the outcome to be successful. The fewer challenging behaviors observed after extinction will most likely produce a less significant spontaneous recovery. While working towards extinction there are different distributions or schedules of when to administer reinforcements. Interventionists may use intermittent reinforcement schedules or continuous reinforcement. Schedules can be both fixed and variable and also the number of reinforcements given during each interval can vary.

=== Extinction procedures in the classroom ===
A positive classroom environment wields better results in learning growth. Therefore, in order for children to be successful in the classroom, their environment should be free of problem behaviors that can cause distractions. The classroom should be a place that offers consistency, structure, and stability, where the student feels empowered, supported and safe. When problem behaviors occur, learning opportunities decrease. Problem behaviors in the classroom that would benefit from extinction may include off-task behaviors, blurting, yelling, interrupting and use of inappropriate language. The use of extinction has been used primarily when the problem behaviors interfered with successful classroom outcomes. While other methods have been used in conjunction with extinction, positive outcomes are not likely when extinction is not used in behavior interventions.

=== Escape Extinction ===
Escape extinction refers to the inability to use a behavior to escape a demand. For example, a child who does not wish to be fed may cover their mouth or turn their head away from the spoon. If the child has previously learned that the feeder eventually tires of this and allows them to escape the demand of feeding, then the behavior is reinforced. In escape extinction, the feeder would continue to present the food until the behavior stops and the child allows themselves to be fed. Escape Extinction (EE) is also sometimes used in instances when having to make choices causes problem behavior. An example of this could be having to choose between mint or strawberry flavored toothpaste when brushing your teeth. Those would be the only two options available; one could not choose to forgo toothbrushing. When implementing EE, the interventionist will use prompting to help the subject make a choice.

=== Attention Extinction ===
Attention extinction refers to a lack of attention given to behaviors that are reinforced and maintained by attention. For example, if a child throws a tantrum and gains attention, the tantrum behavior could be reinforced. To implement extinction, the interventionist would withhold attention during the course of the behavior. Removing this reinforcement (attention) would reduce the tantruming behavior.

== Autism ==
Children with Autism Spectrum Disorder (ASD) are known to have restricted or repetitive behaviors that can cause problems when trying to function in day-to-day activities. Some problem behaviors may include, but are not limited to, self-injurious behaviors, aggression, tantrums, problems with sleep, and making choices. Extinction is often used as an intervention to help with problem behaviors.

In autism care, the prevailing behavioral therapy is Applied Behavior Analysis, or ABA. ABA does not exclusively deal in extinction intervention, but the use of extinction intervention in autism care is controversial. Many question the use of attention or escape extinction for its perceived low social validity. Low social validity (the acceptability and appropriateness of an intervention) and difficulty of consistent implementation has led to many researchers examining gentler ways to implement extinction based interventions. Preliminary research suggests that these kinder methods may be just as effective.

== Anxiety ==
Fear extinction is the fundamental principle behind exposure therapy, a common treatment for anxiety disorders. In this process, the conditioned fear responses diminish progressively over time, when the previously conditioned stimulus is presented without being paired with the unconditioned stimulus.

As of 2025, a theory has been posited that extinction-based learning does not replace the original fear memory, but rather created a new 'safety memory' that inhibited the fear response. The safety response was hoped to be dominant over the fear memory.

To understand the brain changes during this, a task-functional Magnetic Resonance Imaging (fMRI) can be performed. Moreover, Positron Emission Tomography (PET) can be used to quantify endogenous dopamine release. Dopamine antagonists like [^{11}C] raclopride and [^{18}F] fallypride can be used to study D2/D3 dopamine receptor binding potential in the brain. [^{11}C] Raclopride is popular in studies focusing on striatal dopamine activity and ease of use considering a shorter half-life (about 20 minutes). On the other hand, [^{18}F] fallypride is best for studying extrastriatal dopamine binding potential but has a half-life of approximately 110 minutes. Additionally, simultaneous PET and fMRI allow researchers to capture both dopamine binding potential and blood oxygen level-dependent (BOLD) signals during the task. Recent studies highlight the critical role of dorsolateral and ventromedial prefrontal cortex regions (vmPFC), together with other areas like the anterior insula, amygdala, and hippocampus in facilitating fear extinction processes.

== Neurobiology ==
=== Glutamate ===
Glutamate is a neurotransmitter that has been extensively implicated in the neural basis of learning. D-Cycloserine (DCS) is a partial agonist for the glutamate receptor NMDA at the glycine site, and has been trialed as an adjunct to conventional exposure-based treatments based on the principle of cue extinction.

A role for glutamate has also been identified in the extinction of a cocaine-associated environmental stimulus through testing in rats. Specifically, the metabotropic glutamate 5 receptor (mGlu5) is important for the extinction of a cocaine-associated context and a cocaine-associated cue.

=== Dopamine ===
Dopamine is another neurotransmitter implicated in learning extinction across both appetitive and aversive domains. Dopamine signaling has been implicated in the extinction of conditioned fear and the extinction of drug-related learning

=== Circuitry ===
The brain region most extensively implicated in learning extinction is the infralimbic cortex (IL) of the medial prefrontal cortex (mPFC) The IL is important for the extinction of reward- and fear-associated behaviors, while the amygdala has been strongly implicated in the extinction of conditioned fear. The posterior cingulate cortex (PCC) and temporoparietal junction (TPJ) have also been identified as regions that may be associated with impaired extinction in adolescents.

== Across development ==
There is a strong body of evidence to suggest that extinction alters across development. That is, learning extinction may differ during infancy, childhood, adolescence and adulthood. During infancy and childhood, learning extinction is especially persistent, which some have interpreted as erasure of the original CS-US association, but this remains contentious. In contrast, during adolescence and adulthood extinction is less persistent, which is interpreted as new learning of a CS-no US association that exists in tandem and opposition to the original CS-US memory.

== See also ==
- Operant conditioning
- Post-traumatic stress disorder
