= Exposure hierarchy =

Exposure therapy technique

In exposure therapy, an exposure hierarchy is developed to help clients confront their feared objects and situations in a manner that is systematic and controlled for the purpose of systematic desensitization. Exposure hierarchies are included in the treatment of a wide range of anxiety disorders.

An exposure hierarchy itself is a list of objects and situations that an individual fears or avoids that are graded or rank-ordered in their ability to elicit anxiety. The least anxiety-provoking situations are ordered at the bottom of the hierarchy while the most anxiety-provoking situations are at the top. Exposure hierarchies typically consist of 10-15 items and will guide the client’s exposure practices. An abbreviated example of an exposure hierarchy is pictured in Image 1.

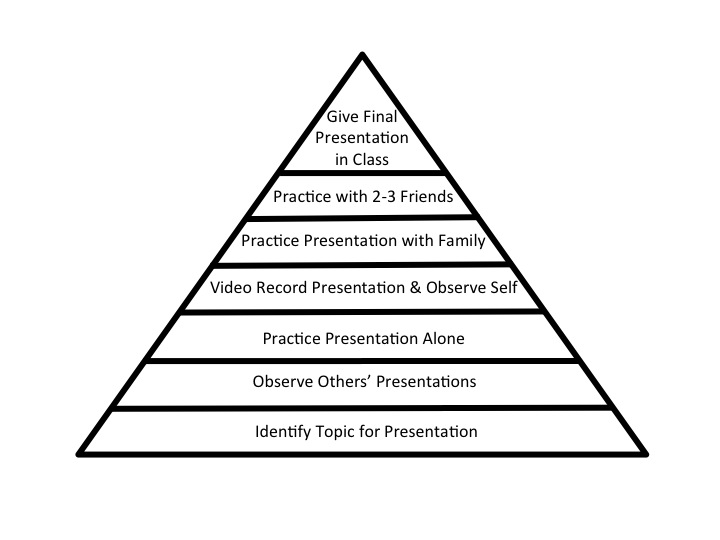
Image 1: Exposure hierarchy example for treating public speaking fears.

When exposure to an item at the bottom of the hierarchy leads to moderately reduced distress or increased tolerance, a client progresses up the hierarchy to more and more difficult exposures. An exposure hierarchy can also be used as an assessment tool of the client's progress and their increasing ability to habituate to fearful situations further up in their hierarchy.

== Design ==
When designing an exposure hierarchy, therapists first conduct a thorough assessment of their client's fear with particular attention to the (a) feared object or situation, (b) feared consequences of confronting the object, (c) fear-related avoidance or safety behaviors, and (d) triggers and contexts of the fear. The assessment often focuses on one source of anxiety (e.g. social anxiety) that the client and therapist prioritize as the main target of intervention, often because it is the most distressing or causes the most impairment. Table 1, adapted from Dobson & Dobson (2009), displays a wide range possible items to include in an exposure hierarchy based on the client's diagnosis.

Table 1: Possible Targets in Exposure Hierarchy
Social "gaffes" or mistakes in Social Anxiety Disorder
Presentations or being center of attention in Public Speaking Fears
Physiological sensations (e.g. dizziness) in Panic Disorder
Feared memories or images in Posttraumatic Stress Disorder
The feared situations (e.g. encounters with snakes) in Specific Phobias
Being in situations where escape is difficult (e.g. crowds) in Agoraphobia
Ruminations and worries in Generalized Anxiety Disorder

Second, the therapist and client work collaboratively to develop an individually tailored list of feared situations that center on the identified target area (e.g. social anxiety). A list often includes several different situations that cause fear to varying degrees. For example, a fear hierarchy for a client with public speaking fears could include various situations that might trigger fears of embarrassment or judgment like: identifying a topic for a presentation, watching others give a presentation, practicing the presentation alone, practicing the presentation in front of a small and familiar audience, and giving the final presentation in front of a large audience. Though it is not uncommon for those with public speaking fears to have fears of other social situations (e.g. eating in public, making mistakes) if the situation is not feared or avoided by the client, it would not be included in his or her individualized fear hierarchy.

Third, after a list of several feared or avoided situations is generated, the therapist guides the client to rank-order the level of distress elicited by each of the situations. The client uses the Subjective Units of Distress Scale (SUDS) to rate the situation on a scale of 0 (no fear) to 100 (most severe distress ever experienced). Returning to our example of a client with public speaking fears, she may rate the task of choosing a presentation topic as 20 SUDS while speaking in front of a large audience as 95 SUDS. The items are then ordered on the hierarchy from lowest to highest SUDS ratings (see Image 1).

Finally, after the hierarchy is developed, the client completes exposures from the bottom of the hierarchy to the top.

== Efficacious hierarchy designs ==
=== Content ===
In general, the most effective hierarchies are ones in which the items are specific to the client and that most closely resembles their experience of fear in the real world, particularly ones that elicit the same cognitions and physiological reactions. In some cases, other individuals should be involved in the exposure to mimic the experience of fear more closely (e.g. a client with social anxiety giving a presentation to her group of peers).

=== Gradual exposure ===
The existing empirical literature does not indicate whether it is more effective to gradually expose clients using a rank-ordered exposure hierarchy compared to moving quickly through the hierarchy or immediately starting therapy at the top of the hierarchy. Nonetheless, clients tend to prefer the more gradual approach. Indeed, experience from leading exposure therapists suggests that clients are more likely to engage in exposures and less likely to prematurely stop therapy if the hierarchy is gradual.

=== Intensity ===
The exposure hierarchy should include items that cover the full range in SUDS ratings to ensure that the worst fear is included and confronted during therapy. Exposure practices that are too low in intensity may not teach clients that they can overcome or tolerate their fear in other situations and they may continue to believe that some (more intense) fears are valid and should continue to be avoided. Nonetheless, inducing too much arousal or horror rather than moderate arousal during an exposure does not lead to improved symptoms and may cause drop-out.

=== Duration and frequency ===
Items on the fear hierarchy can be graded not just in content (e.g. choosing presentation topic versus giving presentation), but graded in duration of the exposure (e.g. 5-minute exposure versus 30-minute exposure). It is generally recommended that clients continue the exposure long enough to initiate their typical fear response, and adjusting the duration is one strategy for generating moderate anxiety rather than arousal that is too low or too high.

Research has not clearly established whether it is more effective to have massed exposures (i.e. exposures very close together in time) than spaced exposures (i.e. longer time between exposures). For a review, see Abramowitz et al. (2012) and Vorstenbosch et al. (2014).

=== Context ===
As summarized by Vorstenbosch et al. (2014), the generalizability and durability of gains made in exposure therapy is highly dependent on the context of the exposure practices. As such, certain conditions may optimize the effectiveness of exposure hierarchies. This includes conducting exposures across contexts that are: (a) varied and different in nature, (b) do not include safety cues (e.g. therapist, medication), and likely to elicit fear that is problematic or impairing.
