= Joseph Wolpe =

American behavior therapist (1915–1997)

- Born: 20 April 1915; Johannesburg
- Died: 4 December 1997; Los Angeles
- Education: University of the Witwatersrand
- Occupations: Psychiatrist; behaviour therapist; medical doctor
- Awards: James McKeen Cattell Fellow Award (1992); APA Distinguished Scientific Award for the Applications of Psychology (1979)
- Scientific career
- Workplaces: University of the Witwatersrand; University of Virginia; Lewis Katz School of Medicine (1965–1988); Pepperdine University

Joseph Wolpe (20 April 1915 – 4 December 1997) was a South African psychiatrist and one of the most influential figures in behavior therapy.

Wolpe grew up in South Africa, attending Parktown Boys' High School and obtaining his MD from the University of the Witwatersrand.

In 1956, Wolpe was awarded a Ford Fellowship and spent a year at Stanford University in the Center for Behavioral Sciences, subsequently returning to South Africa but permanently moving to the United States in 1960 when he accepted a position at the University of Virginia.

In 1965, Wolpe accepted a position at Temple University.

One of the most influential experiences in Wolpe's life was when he enlisted in the South African army as a medical officer. Wolpe was entrusted to treat soldiers who were diagnosed with what was then called "war neurosis" but today is known as post traumatic stress disorder. The mainstream treatment of the time for soldiers was based on psychoanalytic theory, and involved exploring the trauma while taking a hypnotic agent – so-called narcotherapy. It was believed that having the soldiers talk about their repressed experiences openly would effectively cure their neurosis. However, this was not the case. It was this lack of successful treatment outcomes that forced Wolpe, once a dedicated follower of Freud, to question psychoanalytic therapy and search for more effective treatment options. Wolpe is most well known for his reciprocal inhibition techniques, particularly systematic desensitization, which revolutionized behavioral therapy. A Review of General Psychology survey, published in 2002, ranked Wolpe as the 53rd most cited psychologist of the 20th century.

== Reciprocal inhibition ==
In Wolpe's search for a more effective way in treating anxiety he developed different reciprocal inhibition techniques, utilizing assertiveness training. Reciprocal inhibition can be defined as anxiety being inhibited by a feeling or response that is not compatible with the feeling of anxiety. Wolpe first started using eating as a response to inhibited anxiety in the laboratory cats. He would offer them food while presenting a conditioned fear stimulus. After his experiments in the laboratory he applied reciprocal inhibition to his clients in the form of assertiveness training. The idea behind assertiveness training was that you could not be angry or aggressive while simultaneously assertive at same time. Importantly, Wolpe believed that these techniques would lessen the anxiety producing association. Assertiveness training proved especially useful for clients who had anxiety about social situations. However, assertiveness training did have a potential flaw in the sense that it could not be applied to other kinds of phobias. Wolpe's use of reciprocal inhibition led to his discovery of systematic desensitization. He believed that facing your fears did not always result in overcoming them but rather lead to frustration. According to Wolpe, the key to overcoming fears was "by degrees". This idea was not necessarily original to Wolpe as a similar concept was discussed in works of Abu Zayd al-Balkhi, who lived about 1000 years earlier.

== Systematic desensitization ==
Systematic desensitization is what Wolpe is most famous for. Systematic desensitization is when the client is exposed to the anxiety-producing stimulus at a low level, and once no anxiety is present a stronger version of the anxiety-producing stimulus is given. This continues until the individual client no longer feels any anxiety towards the stimulus. There are three main steps in using systematic desensitization, following development of a proper case formulation or what Wolpe originally called, "behavior analysis". The first step is to teach the client relaxation techniques.

Wolpe received the idea of relaxation from Edmund Jacobson, modifying his muscle relaxation techniques to take less time. Wolpe's rationale was that one cannot be both relaxed and anxious at the same time. The second step is for the client and the therapist to create a hierarchy of anxieties. The therapist normally has the client make a list of all the things that produce anxiety in all its different forms. Then together, with the therapist, the client makes a hierarchy, starting with what produces the lowest level of anxiety to what produces the most anxiety. Next is to have the client be fully relaxed while imaging the anxiety producing stimulus. Depending on what their reaction is, whether they feel no anxiety or a great amount of anxiety, the stimulus will then be changed to a stronger or weaker one. Systematic desensitization, though successful, has flaws as well. The patient may give misleading hierarchies, have trouble relaxing, or not be able to adequately imagine the scenarios. Despite this possible flaw, it seems to be most successful. When Wolpe developed systematic desensitisatio", nowadays called exposure, he combined relaxation and hypnotic imagery. He found it very difficult to arrange a relaxed anxiety-free state in the context of real-life anxieties. "The problem was solved by applying relaxation against hypnotically-induced anxiety-eliciting images. This was the origin of systematic desensibilization." (Wolpe 1996)

== Achievements ==
Wolpe's effect on behavioral therapy is long-lasting and extensive. He received many awards for his work in behavioral science. His awards included the American Psychological Associations Distinguished Scientific Award, the Psi Chi Distinguished Member Award, and the Lifetime Achievement Award from the Association for the Advancement of Behavior Therapy, where he was the second president. In addition to these awards, Wolpe's alma mater, University of Witwatersrand, awarded him an honorary doctor of science degree in 1986. Furthermore, Wolpe was a prolific writer, some of his most famous books include, The Practice of Behavior Therapy and Psychotherapy by Reciprocal Inhibition. Joseph Wolpe's dedication to psychology is clear in his involvement in the psychology community, a month before his death he was attending conferences and giving lectures at Pepperdine University even though he was retired. Moreover, his theories have lasted well beyond his death.

Wolpe developed the Subjective Units of Disturbance Scale (SUDS) for assessing the level of subjective discomfort or psychological pain. He also created the Subjective Anxiety Scale (SAS) and the Fear Survey Plan that are used in behavior research and therapy.

Wolpe died in 1997 of mesothelioma.

== Bibliography ==
- Deuraseh, Nurdeen (December 2005). "Mental health in Islamic medical tradition". The International Medical Journal. 4 (2): 76–77.
- Haggbloom, Steven J.; Warnick, Renee; Warnick, Jason E.; Jones, Vinessa K.; Yarbrough, Gary L.; Russell, Tenea M.; Borecky, Chris M.; McGahhey, Reagan; Powell, John L. III; Beavers, Jamie; Monte, Emmanuelle (2002). "The 100 most eminent psychologists of the 20th century". Review of General Psychology. 6 (2): 139–52. doi:10.1037/1089-2680.6.2.139. S2CID 145668721.
- Pace, Eric (8 December 1997). "Dr. Joseph Wolpe, 82, Dies; Pioneer in Behavior Therapy". The New York Times. p. B6.
- Rachman, Stanley (April 2000). "Obituaries: Joseph Wolpe (1915–1997)". American Psychologist. 55 (4): 441–442. doi:10.1037/0003-066x.55.4.431.
- Wolpe, Joseph (1 August 1954). "Reciprocal inhibition as the main basis of psychotherapeutic effects". Archives of Neurology and Psychiatry. 72 (2): 205–226. doi:10.1001/archneurpsyc.1954.02330020073007. PMID 13180056.
- Wolpe, Joseph (1958). Psychotherapy by Reciprocal Inhibition. Stanford University Press.
- Wolpe, Joseph (1969). The Practice of Behavior Therapy. Pergamon Press.
- Wolpe, Joseph; Lazarus, Arnold (1966). Behavior Therapy Techniques. Oxford: Pergamon Press.
- Wolpe, Joseph; Turkat, Ira (1985). "Behavioral formulation of clinical cases". In Turkat, I. D. (ed.). Behavioral Case Formulation. New York: Plenum/Springer.
- Wolpe, Joseph; Wolpe, David (1981). Our Useless Fears. Boston: Houghton Mifflin Company.
- Wolpe, J. (1996). Hypnosis and the Evolution of Behavior Therapy. In: B. Peter, B. Trenkle, F.C. Kinzel, C. Duffner & A. Iost-Peter. Munich Lectures on Hypnosis and Psychotherapy. Hypnosis International Monographs nr 2.
