= David Lisak =

American psychologist

Academic background
- Education: Duke University
- Thesis: Motives and psychodynamics of non-incarcerated rapists (1989)

Academic work
- Institutions: University of Massachusetts Boston
- Main interests: Clinical psychologist (retired)
- Website: www.davidlisak.com

David Lisak is an American clinical psychologist. He received his PhD from Duke University, and is a retired associate professor of psychology at the University of Massachusetts Boston. Lisak's research focuses on "the causes and consequences of interpersonal violence...motives and behaviors of rapists and murderers, the impact of childhood abuse on adult men, and relationship between child abuse and later violence".

== Research ==
External videos
- The 2013 Women's History Month Keynote Address at Emory University, 28 March 2013
- David Lisak: Confronting the Reality of Sexual Violence on the College Campus via YouTube

Lisak began his research in graduate school at Duke in the 1980s. He had noticed that most of the research on rape and sexual assault consisted of interviews with victims, who reported almost exclusively acquaintance rape rather than stranger rape, and studies on incarcerated rapists, who were almost exclusively stranger rapists. Lisak became interested in studying the rapists who committed the most common form of rape but who did not get caught and go to prison.

Lisak performed a meta-analysis of four surveys conducted from 1991 to 1998, surveying 1,882 male Boston college students, resulting in a landmark study of undetected rapists that was published in 2002. The study began with a questionnaire, which Lisak reported following up with interviews of each respondent. The questions included things like "Have you ever had sexual intercourse with someone, even though they did not want to, because they were too intoxicated [on alcohol or drugs] to resist your sexual advances?" and "Have you ever had sexual intercourse with an adult when they didn't want to because you used physical force [twisting their arm, holding them down, etc.] if they didn't cooperate?" In 2015, Linda M. LeFauve, an Associate Vice President at Davidson College and contributor to the American libertarian think tank Reason Foundation, questioned Lisak about how he conducted follow-up interviews based on responses to an anonymous survey; Lisak refused to comment and hung up the phone.

As with other social science interviews and questionnaires about interpersonal violence, Lisak avoided the use of terms such as "rape", "assault", and "abuse", instead describing in detail the behavior in question, without applying labels that the perpetrators might not identify with. Although the situations described are legally rape, Lisak found the men were not reluctant to talk about them, seeing them as sexual conquests to brag about, and did not think of themselves as rapists; according to Lisak, such men are narcissistic and "like nothing better" than to talk about their "sexual exploits". Approximately 5% of the study participants reported having committed rape.

Lisak notes that most rapists who are prosecuted are convicted on a single count of rape, and describes as sobering studies that find incarcerated rapists typically have raped multiple people, with findings ranging from an average of seven to an average of 11 victims. His own research found the same was true for undetected rapists, with serial rapists accounting for 90% of all campus rapes with an average of six rapes each. He found that both undetected and convicted rapists held prejudiced attitudes towards women and a need for dominance.

Compared with non-rapists, Lisak found that rapists are measurably more angry at women and more motivated by a desire to dominate and control them, are more impulsive, disinhibited, anti-social and hyper-masculine, and less empathic. Lisak characterized rapists as extremely adept at identifying potential victims and testing their boundaries, and said that they planned their attacks and used sophisticated strategies to isolate and groom victims, used violence instrumentally in order to terrify and coerce, and used psychological weapons against their victims including power, manipulation, control and threats. Lisak also says that rapists target vulnerable victims, such as female freshmen who have less experience with drinking and are more likely to take risks, or people who are already intoxicated; they use alcohol as a weapon, as it makes the victim more vulnerable at the time but also impairs their credibility with the justice system should they choose to report the rape.

Lisak has also noted that recent research has contradicted the long-held assumption that rapists specialize in particular types of victims with the reality, he says, being "far murkier". "Multiple studies," he has written, "have now documented that between 33% and 66% of rapists have also sexually attacked children; that up to 82% of child molesters have also sexually attacked adults; and that between 50% and 66% of incest offenders have also sexually attacked children outside their families."

Lisak argues that his and similar findings conflict sharply with the widely held view that college rapes are typically perpetrated by "a basically 'decent' young man who, were it not for too much alcohol and too little communication, would never do such a thing", with the evidence actually suggesting that the vast majority of rapes are committed by serial, violent predators. Therefore, he argues, prevention efforts aimed at persuading men not to rape are unlikely to work, and universities should instead focus on helping non-rapists to identify rapists and intervene in high-risk situations to stop them. He also argues that whenever a nonstranger sexual assault is reported, it represents a window of opportunity for law enforcement to comprehensively investigate the alleged offender, rather than "putting blinders on looking solely on the alleged 45-minute interaction between these two people".

== Corroboration and criticism ==
Research on campus rape continues, and Lisak's views are still being examined by researchers. Similar results to Lisak's were found in Stephanie McWhorter's 2009 Reports of rape reperpetration by newly enlisted male navy personnel, a study done on Navy recruits at RTC Great Lakes.

In 2015, researcher Kevin Swartout published a study in JAMA Pediatrics that found a higher number of men committing rape in college than had Lisak's study but that most were not repeat offenders. In response, Lisak, along with Jim Hopper and Allison Tracy, sent a letter to the journal that published Swartout et al.'s paper reporting that Swartout's study used a flawed and deceptive methodology involving an entirely new and dubious definition of "serial rape" that undercounted the number of serial rapists and provided detailed documentation of their findings on PubPeer.

Following Swartout's study, LeFauve published multiple articles in the libertarian magazine Reason that also criticized Lisak's work, finding multiple issues with both Lisak's 2002 study, and with his well-known "Frank" video. LeFauve says that the four studies used by Lisak were not originally about campus sexual assault, and were repurposed by Lisak for such using only a few questions at the very end of the several pages long questionnaire, and that

The most widely quoted figures—that 90 percent of campus rapes are committed by serial offenders and that they average six rapes each—were calculated on a total of 76 non-traditional students who were not living on a college campus, and whose offenses may or may not have happened on or near a college campus, may or may not have been perpetrated on other students, and may have happened at any time in the survey respondents' adult lives.

LeFauve later went further in a second article, detailing how Lisak's "Frank" video that he's often used in presentations to "college campuses, the military, the judiciary, law enforcement, and untold conferences," which is presented as a re-enactment of a single, unedited interview, is in fact a splicing of multiple interviews from Lisak's 1989 Ph.D. thesis with possibly fabricated information included that presents an extremely biased and misleading representation of the typical college rapist.

In response to LeFauve's first article, Lisak stated that he stands by his research, indicating that Reason got several points wrong and may have mixed up several of his statements. However, in her article on the validity (or rather, invalidity) of Lisak's "Frank" video and the conclusions he draws about serial rapists, LeFauve retorts that Lisak "misstated what the articles said" in his response to her first article.

== Other ==
Lisak has criticized the justice system's approach to rape:

Somehow, all we can do is take the statement from the victim.

Take the statement from the alleged perpetrator and then throw up our hands because they are saying conflicting things...

That's not how we investigate other crimes.

If, Lisak says, police discount the report of a victim who was intoxicated or otherwise vulnerable, they are "giving a free pass to sexual predators". Especially because of the prevalence of repeat offenders, he encourages police departments and prosecutors to investigate the background of people accused of sexual assault, as they do with, for instance, accused drug dealers, and also to investigate post-assault evidence such as PTSD in the victim.

Lisak was the founding editor of Psychology of Men and Masculinity, an American Psychological Association journal. As of 2020, Lisak serves as the vice-chairman and founding board member of 1in6, a non-profit organization with the mission of helping men who have had unwanted or abusive sexual experiences in childhood live healthier, happier lives. Himself a survivor of childhood sexual abuse, Lisak was one of three men profiled in the Big Voice Pictures documentary, Boys and Men Healing. He has also been on the faculty of the National Judicial Education Program and American Prosecutors Research Institute, served as a consultant for the U.S. military, universities, and judicial and law enforcement agencies, and appeared as an expert witness.

== Publications ==
=== Book chapters ===
- Lisak, David (1998), "Sexual aggression, masculinity, and fathers", in Odem, Mary E.; Clay-Warner, Jody (eds.), Confronting rape and sexual assault, Wilmington, Delaware: Rowman & Littlefield, pp. 145–162, ISBN 9780842025997. Preview.
- Lisak, David; Miller, Paul M. (2003). "Childhood trauma, posttraumatic stress disorder, substance abuse, and violence". In Ouimette, Paige; Brown, Pamela J. (eds.). Trauma and substance abuse: causes, consequences, and treatment of comorbid disorders. Washington, DC: American Psychological Association. pp. 73–87. ISBN 9781557989383.

=== Journal articles ===
- Lisak, David; Roth, Susan (November 1988). "Motivational factors in nonincarcerated sexually aggressive men". Journal of Personality and Social Psychology. 55 (5): 795–802. doi:10.1037/0022-3514.55.5.795. PMID 3210146.
- Lisak, David; Roth, Susan (April 1990). "Motives and psychodynamics of self-reported, unincarcerated rapists". American Journal of Orthopsychiatry. 60 (2): 268–280. doi:10.1037/h0079178. PMID 2188510. S2CID 29780720.
- Lisak, David (Winter 1991). "Sexual aggression, masculinity, and fathers". Signs. 16 (2): 238–262. doi:10.1086/494659. JSTOR 3174510. S2CID 143836558.
- Lisak, David (September 1994). "Subjective assessment of relationships with parents by sexually aggressive and nonaggressive men". Journal of Interpersonal Violence. 9 (3): 399–411. doi:10.1177/088626094009003008. S2CID 144752150.
- Lisak, David; Luster, Laura (October 1994). "Educational, occupational, and relationship histories of men who were sexually and/or physically abused as children". Journal of Traumatic Stress. 7 (4): 507–523. doi:10.1002/jts.2490070402. PMID 7820346.
- Lisak, David (October 1994). "The psychological impact of sexual abuse: content analysis of interviews with male survivors". Journal of Traumatic Stress. 7 (4): 525–548. doi:10.1002/jts.2490070403. PMID 7820347. Pdf.
- Lisak, David (1995). "Integrating a critique of gender in the treatment of male survivors of childhood abuse". Psychotherapy: Theory, Research, Practice, Training. 32 (2): 258–269. doi:10.1037/0033-3204.32.2.258.
- Lisak, David; Ivan, Carol (September 1995). "Deficits in intimacy and empathy in sexually aggressive men". Journal of Interpersonal Violence. 10 (3): 296–308. doi:10.1177/088626095010003004. S2CID 144954751.
- Lisak, David; Hopper, Jim; Song, Pat (1996). "Factors in the cycle of violence: Gender rigidity and emotional constriction". Journal of Traumatic Stress. 9 (4): 721–743. doi:10.1002/jts.2490090405. PMID 8902743. Pdf.
- Lisak, David; Miller, Paul M. (February 2002). "Repeat rape and multiple offending among undetected rapists". Violence & Victims. 17 (1): 73–84. doi:10.1891/vivi.17.1.73.33638. PMID 11991158. S2CID 8401679. Pdf.
- Lisak, David; Beszterczey, Sara (April 2007). "The cycle of violence: the life histories of 43 death row inmates". Psychology of Men and Masculinity. 8 (2): 118–128. doi:10.1037/1524-9220.8.2.118. Pdf.
- Lisak, David; Gardinier, Lori; Nicksa, Sarah C.; Cote, Ashley M. (December 2010). "False allegations of sexual assault: an analysis of ten years of reported cases". Violence Against Women. 16 (12): 1318–1334. doi:10.1177/1077801210387747. PMID 21164210. S2CID 15377916. Pdf.
- Lisak, David (March–April 2011). "Understanding the predatory nature of sexual violence". Sexual Assault Report. 14 (4). Civic Research Institute: 49–64. Pdf.
