= Brainspotting =

Form of psychotherapy

Brainspotting is a psychotherapy technique that attempts to help people process psychological trauma or other problems via eye movements. Practitioners of this technique use a pointer to direct a client’s eye gaze in order to send signals to the brain to resolve psychological or physical concerns. Brainspotting has not been rigorously studied and has frequently been characterized as a pseudoscience or fringe medicine.

== History ==
Therapist David Grand indicates he developed brainspotting in 2003 after working with 9/11 survivors and other patients. David Grand was previously trained in psychoanalysis in the 1980s and EMDR in 1993. He combined EMDR, psychoanalysis, and somatic experiencing into a modality he titled “Natural Flow EMDR,” which became the precursor for brainspotting.

== Technique ==
Grand states that the motto of brainspotting is, “Where you look affects how you feel”. He has hypothesized that allowing one’s gaze to be focused on a specific external location will maintain the brain’s focus on an internal location where traumatic memories are stored, which would promote processing of these memories. Grand believes that influencing the visual field will influence neurological and psychological processes. Currently, no such evidence exists to support this hypothesis, though Grand and his colleague believe that the midbrain is involved. Other researchers argue that such conceptualizations do not accurately reflect how memory functions in the brain.

Brainspotting sessions involve focusing on a presenting problem, rating feelings of distress, focusing on bodily sensations, following guided eye gazes, and practicing focused mindfulness. There are several variations of brainspotting that may include bilateral stimulation via audio recordings called “BioLateral”, wearing goggles that block vision in one eye, or allowing clients to guide therapists on how to direct their gaze.

== Effects and efficacy ==
There is very little quality evidence of efficacy or effectiveness of brainspotting. Although originally designed to treat PTSD, Grand claims that it can also be used to treat anxiety, depression, chronic fatigue syndrome, fibromyalgia, and ADHD. However, no evidence is cited for these claims. One single-subject case study reported that a patient with PTSD experienced lower levels of PTSD and depression symptoms after brainspotting sessions compared to before the session. Another study compared, via within-subjects design, the effects of a single 40-minute session of Eye Movement Desensitization and Reprocessing (EMDR), brainspotting, Body Scan Meditation, and placebo condition in the processing of distressing memories reported by a non-clinical sample of adult participants (psychologists and medical doctors attending a four-year specialization in Systemic Psychotherapy at an Italian Institute of Family Therapy). The authors of the study found that EMDR and BSP appeared to be comparable in terms of efficacy in reducing healthy participants’ subjective disturbance connected with distressing memories and were more effective than placebo.

Although at least 6000 clinicians have been trained in brainspotting, there is no quality evidence of its efficacy and it instead relies on anecdotal claims. Existing studies have been critiqued due to being solely authored by brainspotting’s originators and collaborators, indicating potential bias. Published articles that indicate or hypothesize its efficacy have small sample sizes, utilize non-clinical populations, or are published in journals that are not peer-reviewed. The American Psychological Association does not list brainspotting as a recommended intervention for PTSD under its clinical practice guidelines for mental health professionals.

== See also ==
- Eye movement desensitization and reprocessing
- Treatments for PTSD
- List of topics characterized as pseudoscience
