= Francine Shapiro =

American psychologist, creator of EMDR therapy (1948–2019)

- Born: February 18, 1948; New York City, US
- Died: June 16, 2019 (aged 71); Sea Ranch, California, US
- Education: Brooklyn College (BA, MA); Professional School of Psychological Studies, San Diego (unaccredited, now defunct) (PhD)
- Occupation: Psychologist
- Known for: Eye movement desensitization and reprocessing therapy

Francine Shapiro at a 2010 conference in Bali (25 min.)

Francine Shapiro (February 18, 1948 – June 16, 2019) was an American psychologist and educator who originated and developed eye movement desensitization and reprocessing (EMDR), a controversial form of psychotherapy for resolving the symptoms of traumatic and other disturbing life experiences.

In 1987, she claims she had an experience walking through a park that led to the observation that moving her eyes from side to side appeared to reduce the disturbance of negative thoughts and memories. Challenging this narrative, psychologists Gerald Rosen and Loren Pankratz show that Shapiro was actually involved in the pseudoscientific practice of neurolinguistic programming (NLP) from 1985, conducting workshops as well as writing about the practice. Rosen and Pankratz offer as evidence an image from the January 22, 1985 North County Times of Shapiro and Thomas Grinder as NLP trainers with their "eye access patterns" signage. They call Shapiro's origin story "fanciful".

She claims that her experience in 1987 led her to examine this phenomenon more systematically. Working with approximately 70 volunteers, she conducted additional research and published a randomized controlled study with trauma victims. After further research and elaboration of the methodology, she published a textbook in 1995 detailing the eight phases of this form of psychotherapy. The text is now in its third edition.

In more recent years, EMDR has been categorized as a form of purple hat therapy and pseudoscience.

== Early life and education ==
Shapiro was born to Jewish parents in the East New York section of Brooklyn. She had three younger siblings. Her father, Daniel Shapiro, was a car mechanic who owned an auto-parts store, managed a garage, and had a fleet of taxis. Her mother, Shirley managed the household. After her younger sister died at age 9 in 1965, Shapiro said it affected her deeply.

Shapiro attended and graduated from Thomas Jefferson High School in Brooklyn. She then studied English at Brooklyn College, City University of New York where she earned a bachelor's degree in 1968 and completed her master's degree in 1975. In 1974, while employed full-time as a high school English teacher, she enrolled in a PhD program in English Literature at New York University. In 1979, having completed all but her dissertation, she was diagnosed with breast cancer.

Shapiro travelled, then settled in San Diego and set up a nonprofit organization, Human Development Institute, along with Shirley Phares-Kime. The institute provided weekend and 8-week training sessions in Neuro-linguistic programming (NLP).

Over the next few years she participated in numerous workshops and programs exploring various stress reduction and self-care procedures. According to Robert Todd Carroll, she then enrolled in the Professional School of Psychological Studies, San Diego (a now defunct non-regionally accredited graduate training program). Her observations regarding the beneficial effect of eye movements, and the development of procedures to utilize them in clinical practice, became the basis of her dissertation. She received her PhD in 1988, and her thesis was published in the Journal of Traumatic Stress in 1989, followed by an invited article that was published in the Journal of Behavior Therapy and Experimental Psychiatry.

== Eye movement desensitization and reprocessing ==
In the late 1980s Shapiro invented and developed eye movement desensitization and reprocessing (EMDR), a controversial form of exposure therapy to which various other activities (for example eye movement) are required from the person being treated.

In a workshop, Shapiro related how the idea of the therapy came to her while she was taking a walk in the woods, and discerned she had been able to cope better with disturbing thoughts when also experiencing saccadic eye movements. Psychologist Gerald Rosen has expressed doubt about this description, saying that people are normally not aware of this type of eye movement. Gerald Rosen and Bruce Grimley suggest that it is more likely that she developed EMDR out of her experience with neuro-linguistic programming.

Shapiro went on to devote herself to the development and research of EMDR therapy. She was a senior research fellow emeritus at the Mental Research Institute, Palo Alto, California, executive director of the EMDR Institute, Watsonville, California, and founder and president emeritus of EMDR Humanitarian Assistance Programs, a non-profit organization that coordinates disaster response and pro bono trainings worldwide. The organization was a recipient of the 2011 International Society for Traumatic Stress Studies Sarah Haley Memorial Award for Clinical Excellence. Shapiro was designated as one of the “Cadre of Experts” of the American Psychological Association & Canadian Psychological Association Joint Initiative on Ethnopolitical Warfare, and served as advisor to a wide variety of trauma treatment and outreach organizations and journals. She was an invited speaker at psychology conferences and universities worldwide, and wrote and co-authored more than 60 journal articles, chapters, and books about EMDR, including the primary text Eye Movement Desensitization and Reprocessing: Basic Principles, Protocols and Procedures. She was a licensed clinical psychologist and resided in Northern California.

In the early 2000s, peer reviewed systematic trials on EMDR have described it as a pseudoscience given the primary therapeutic mechanisms are unfalsifiable and non-scientific. A peer reviewed systematic meta analysis in 2024 found it as effective as other therapies.

== Awards ==
As the developer of EMDR, Shapiro was the recipient of a variety of awards, including the International Sigmund Freud Award for Psychotherapy of the City of Vienna in conjunction with the World Council for Psychotherapy, the American Psychological Association Trauma Psychology Division Award for Outstanding Contributions to Practice in Trauma Psychology, and the Distinguished Scientific Achievement in Psychology Award presented by the California Psychological Association.

== Death ==
Shapiro received a second cancer diagnosis in her later years.

She died suddenly at age 71 on June 16, 2019, at a medical facility in Sonoma County, California, not far from her home in Sea Ranch, after a long struggle with respiratory issues. The cause of death is unknown.

== Publications ==
=== Books ===
- Shapiro, Francine (2001). Eye movement desensitization and reprocessing: basic principles, protocols, and procedures (2nd ed.). New York: Guilford. ISBN 978-1-57230-672-1.
- Shapiro, Francine, ed. (2002). EMDR as an integrative psychotherapy approach: experts of diverse orientations explore the paradigm prism. Washington, DC: American Psychological Assoc. ISBN 978-1-55798-922-2.
- Shapiro, Francine (2013). Getting Past Your Past: Take Control of Your Life with Self-Help Techniques from EMDR Therapy. Gordonsville: Potter/Ten Speed/Harmony/Rodale. ISBN 978-1-59486-425-4.
- Shapiro, Francine; Forrest, Margot Silk (2004). EMDR: the breakthrough therapy for overcoming anxiety, stress, and trauma (Updated ed.). New York, NY: BasicBooks. ISBN 978-0-465-04301-9.
- Shapiro, Francine; Kaslow, Florence Whitheman; Maxfield, Louise (2007). Handbook of EMDR and family therapy processes. Hoboken, N.J: John Wiley & Sons. ISBN 978-0-471-70947-3.
- Solomon, Marion Fried, ed. (2001). Short-term therapy for long-term change. New York: Norton. ISBN 978-0-393-70333-7.
- Adler-Tapia, R., Settle, C., & Shapiro, F. (2012). Eye Movement Desensitization and Reprocessing (EMDR) psychotherapy with children who have experienced sexual abuse and trauma. In P. Goodyear-Brown & P. Goodyear-Brown (Ed) (Eds.), Handbook of child sexual abuse: Identification, assessment, and treatment.
- Shapiro, Francine (2017). Eye Movement Desensitization and Reprocessing (EMDR) Therapy, Third Edition: Basic Principles, Protocols, and Procedures (3rd ed.). New York: Guilford Publications. ISBN 978-1-4625-3276-6.

== Sources ==
- Brown, S., & Shapiro, F. (2006). EMDR in the Treatment of Borderline Personality Disorder. Clinical Case Studies, 5(5), 403–420.
