= Accelerated Resolution Therapy =

Psychotherapy for trauma and other issues

Accelerated Resolution Therapy (ART) is a brief, manualized form of psychotherapy developed by licensed marriage and family therapist Laney Rosenzweig in 2008. It uses imagery-based techniques, attention to physical and emotional responses, and therapist-directed eye movements while a person recalls distressing memories. Clients do not have to describe the details of a traumatic event verbally to the therapist.

ART has been studied mainly as a treatment for Post-traumatic stress disorder (PTSD) and trauma-related symptoms. Clinical studies have reported reductions in PTSD symptoms as well as depression, anxiety, psychological distress, and sleep problems. A 2024 systematic review of five primary studies involving 337 enrolled adults described ART as a promising, time-efficient treatment for PTSD, while concluding that more high-quality research, particularly comparisons with established PTSD treatments, is needed.

== History ==
ART was developed in 2008 by Laney Rosenzweig. She is a licensed marriage and family therapist who has worked in the mental health field since 1989. The first clinical study of the therapy was published in 2012, followed in 2013 by a randomized controlled trial involving U.S. service members and veterans. In 2015, ART was included in the Substance Abuse and Mental Health Services Administration's National Registry of Evidence-Based Programs and Practices (NREPP), which classified it as "effective" for psychological trauma and depression. In 2016, the U.S. Army awarded the University of South Florida a contract to train military mental health clinicians in ART at several Army installations. The first systematic review of ART for PTSD in adults was published in 2024.

== Technique ==
ART is a highly structured, manualized psychotherapy in which a therapist guides the client through the recall and processing of distressing memories while using sets of horizontal eye movements. The client brings a distressing event or image to mind while attending to associated emotional and physical sensations. ART places particular emphasis on processing physiological or somatic sensations associated with the recalled material. Detailed verbal narration of the traumatic experience is not required.

ART also uses a form of imagery rescripting known as Voluntary Image Replacement (VIR), in which distressing imagery associated with a memory is replaced with imagery selected by the client. The technique is intended to alter the distressing imagery without replacing the factual or narrative memory of the event. ART also incorporates visual imagery, metaphors, Gestalt-based techniques, and other prescribed interventions within its structured protocol. The client selects the replacement imagery, while the therapist guides the sequence of prescribed interventions.

ART and eye movement desensitization and reprocessing (EMDR) both use clinician-directed eye movements while distressing material is processed, but published descriptions identify differences in how the protocols structure reprocessing. ART uses different amounts of eye movements, incorporates attention to associated physiological sensations during processing, and uses Voluntary Image Replacement, in which the client deliberately rescripts distressing imagery. Published descriptions characterize ART's processing as more directive and less free-associative than EMDR. Several processes and mechanisms have been proposed to contribute to ART's effects, including exposure and imagery rescripting, along with hypotheses involving working memory and memory reconsolidation. It is not yet known which mechanisms or individual treatment components account for the clinical effects reported in studies.

== Research ==
=== Post-traumatic stress disorder ===
Most ART research to date has focused on PTSD. A 2012 prospective study of 80 adults with clinically significant PTSD symptoms reported reductions in PTSD symptoms and several related measures after one to five ART sessions. The study did not include a control group.

In 2013, a randomized controlled trial compared ART with an attention-control condition in 57 U.S. service members and veterans with combat-related PTSD symptoms. Participants in the ART group received an average of 3.7 treatment sessions. Participants receiving ART had greater reductions in self-reported PTSD symptoms and several related measures than those in the control condition. Improvements were maintained at three-month follow-up.

A 2024 systematic review included five primary studies with 337 enrolled participants, 250 of whom completed treatment. Two were randomized controlled trials, two were prospective observational studies, and one was a feasibility study. All five reported significant reductions in PTSD symptoms after treatment. Reductions in depression, anxiety, psychological distress, and sleep dysfunction were also reported.

The reviewers did not conduct a meta-analysis because they concluded that the studies differed in design and there were too few studies with low risk of bias. The comparative studies also used different control conditions, so the review could not determine how ART compares with other PTSD treatments. The authors described ART as a promising, time-efficient treatment and recommended further high-quality randomized trials.

The 2023 VA/DoD Clinical Practice Guideline for PTSD found insufficient evidence to recommend for or against ART.

=== Other applications ===
ART has also been studied for complicated grief. In a 2020 randomized controlled trial of 54 older adults who had experienced the death of a hospice care recipient, participants receiving ART showed greater reductions in grief, PTSD, and depressive symptoms than those in a wait-list group. The researchers recommended testing the treatment in larger and more diverse samples. Depression, anxiety, sleep problems, and psychological distress have also improved as secondary outcomes in PTSD studies.
