= Metacognitions questionnaire =

Self-report on metacognitive beliefs

The metacognitions questionnaire is a self-report scale assessing different dimensions of metacognitive beliefs (beliefs about thinking). Examples of metacognitive beliefs are; "Worry is uncontrollable", "I have little confidence in my memory for words and names", and "I am constantly aware of my thinking". The development of the questionnaire was informed by the Self-Regulatory Executive Function model (Wells & Matthews, 1994) which is the metacognitive model and theory of psychological disorder. This model is the foundation for metacognitive therapy developed by Adrian Wells (see e.g. Wells, 2009).

There are two versions of the metacognitions questionnaire.

1. The Metacognitions questionnaire (MCQ) first developed by Sam Cartwright-Hatton and Adrian Wells (1997), consist of 65 items and has a five-factor structure: 1) Positive worry beliefs, 2) Beliefs about uncontrollability and danger of worry, 3) Meta-cognitive efficiency, 4) General negative beliefs, and 5) Cognitive self-consciousness. Responses are required on a four-point scale ranging from 1 (do not agree) to 4 (agree very much), high scores reflect more reported problems with the item in question.
2. The Metacognitions questionnaire 30 (MCQ-30; Wells & Cartwright-Hatton, 2004) is a 30-item version of the MCQ consisting of the same five-factor structure, but the subcategories were renamed: 1) positive beliefs about worry; 2) negative beliefs about the controllability of thoughts and corresponding danger; 3) cognitive confidence; 4) negative beliefs about thoughts in general/need to control thoughts; and 5) cognitive self-consciousness. MCQ-30 uses the same four-point scale as MCQ.

These questionnaires have established reliability and validity, are widely used and have informed research on the importance of metacognitive beliefs and metacognitive knowledge in psychological disorders. They are elevated across psychological disorders. However, there is also evidence that more specific metacognitive beliefs exist in different disorders. Following this work several questionnaires have been developed to measure more disorder-specific metacognitive beliefs. E.g. Wells proposed that obsessive-compulsive disorder (OCD) is associated with a specific type of metacognitive belief concerning the dangerousness and significance of intrusive thoughts. These meta-beliefs are termed thought-fusion beliefs, and can be measured by the 14 item Thought Fusion Instrument (TFI; Wells, Gwilliam, & Cartwright-Hatton, 2001). There is an adolescent version of the MCQ that has been used in research on children (Cartwright-Hatton et al. 2004).
