= Marcantonio M. Spada =

British academic psychologist (born 1970)

Marcantonio M. Spada FBPsS FBABCP
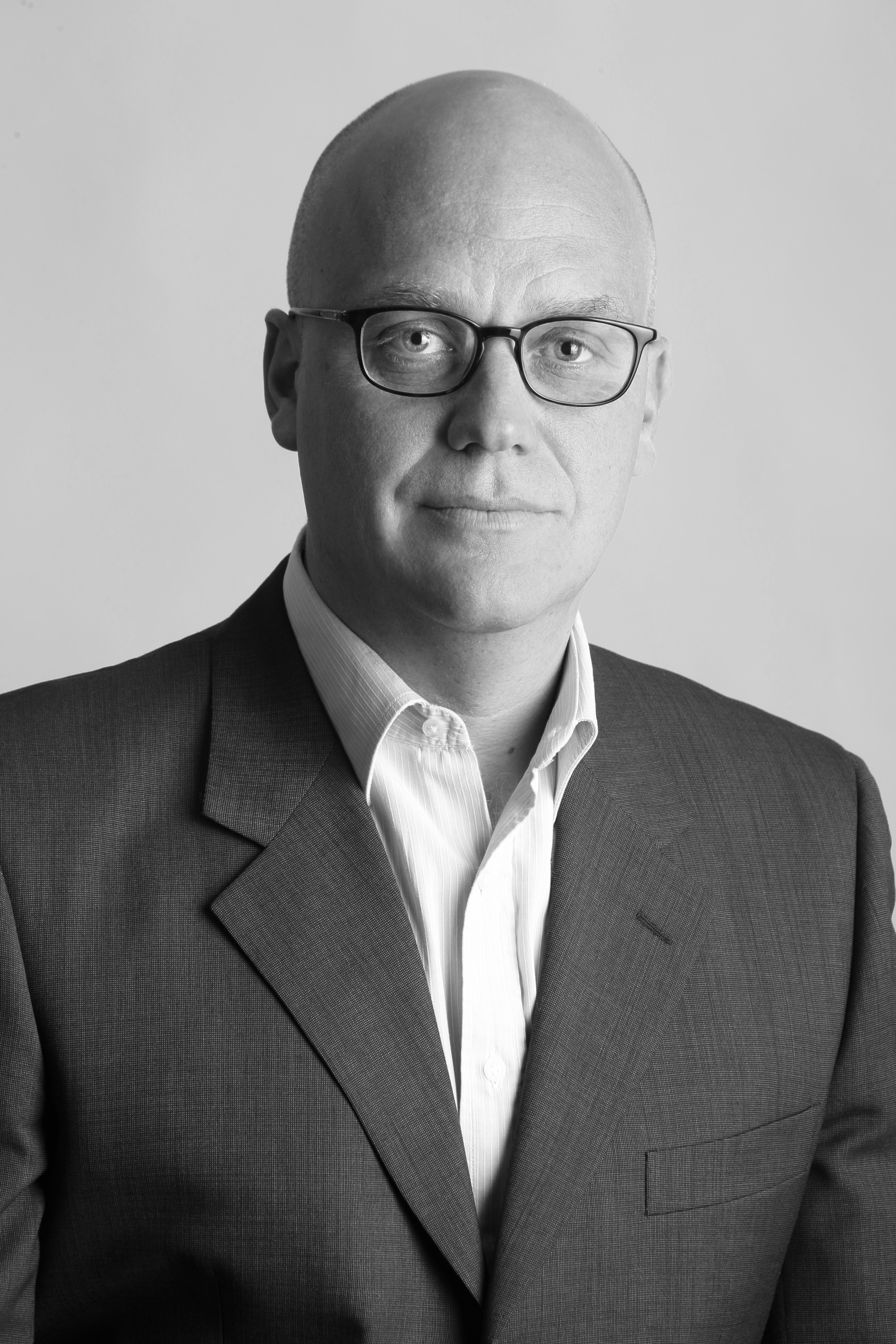
- Born: 13 November 1970 (age 56); Rome, Italy
- Education: University of Bristol; London School of Economics; University College London; University of Manchester
- Known for: Metacognition in addictive behaviours, desire thinking, COVID-19 anxiety syndrome
- Scientific career
- Doctoral advisor: Adrian Wells

Marcantonio M. Spada (born 13 November 1970 in Rome, Italy) is an Italian-British academic psychologist, psychological therapy practitioner, and senior executive.

== Education ==
Spada was educated at St. George's British International School and then attended the University of Bristol (BSc), the London School of Economics (MSc), and University College London (PgDip and MA). He received his PhD from the University of Manchester in 2006 under the supervision of Adrian Wells.

== Career ==
Spada is currently Chief Clinical Officer and Executive Board member at Onebright Mental Health, and Emeritus Professor of Addictive Behaviours and Mental Health at London South Bank University.

He is also the editor-in-chief of the addictions psychology and psychiatry journal Addictive Behaviors, and the founder and former editor-in-chief of its sister journal Addictive Behaviors Reports, both published by Elsevier. In addition, he has served as associate editor of Clinical Psychology & Psychotherapy, published by John Wiley & Sons.

Spada has been elected a fellow of the British Psychological Society and the British Association for Behavioural and Cognitive Psychotherapies for his contribution to the advancement and dissemination of psychological knowledge and practice in the field of addictive behaviours. He has also served as a trustee and the Chair of the Board of Trustees for UK SMART Recovery and as a trustee of GambleAware.

== Research ==
=== Addictive behaviours ===
Spada has contributed to the understanding of metacognitive mechanisms underlying general vulnerability to addictive behaviours, identifying the role of metacognitive beliefs across addictive behaviours, putting forward the first metacognitive therapy model and treatment protocol for addictive behaviours, and operationalising the construct of "desire thinking".

He is an advocate of employing idiographic and functional approaches to the conceptualisation and treatment of psychological problems in cognitive behavioural therapy, supporting psychological therapists in working with clients taking (or withdrawing from) prescribed drugs, raising awareness about problematic betting and gambling behaviour, and working with young people to tackle threats to well-being arising from excessive technological use. He is the author of the successful self-help book Overcoming Problem Drinking, an NHS recommended 'book on prescription' for alcohol misuse.

=== Metacognition in psychopathology ===
Spada has also developed metacognitive models of cyberchondria, procrastination, and self-critical rumination and self-esteem.

=== Psychological distress during the COVID-19 pandemic ===
During the COVID-19 pandemic, Spada contributed to a growing body of literature regarding COVID-19-related psychological distress, having co-developed, with Professor Ana V. Nikčević, the construct of the "COVID-19 anxiety syndrome", and associated psychometric measure, identifying the impact of the syndrome on COVID-19 anxiety, generalised anxiety and depression, and work and social adjustment. The COVID-19 anxiety syndrome is characterised by avoidance, threat monitoring, checking and worry which are presumed to maintain the fear response associated with COVID-19 and exacerbate psychological distress.

Spada has publicly advocated for the importance of supporting those affected by the COVID-19 anxiety syndrome when society returned to normal. Spada has also argued that governments' deployment of behavioural science techniques aimed at shaping behaviour in combination with repeated lockdowns may have, inadvertently or not, fuelled a mental health crisis among the wider population, particularly the young. He advocates for the need to carefully review the consequences of implementing such policies and consider never deploying them again.

== Selected publications ==
- Caselli, G., & Spada, M. M. (2011). "The Desire Thinking Questionnaire: Development and psychometric properties". Addictive Behaviors, 36(11), 1061–1067.
- Nikčević, A. V., Marino, C., Kolubinski, D. C., Leach, D., & Spada, M. M. (2021). "Modelling the contribution of the Big Five personality traits, health anxiety, and COVID-19 psychological distress to generalised anxiety and depressive symptoms during the COVID-19 pandemic". Journal of Affective Disorders, 279, 578-584.
- Nikčević, A. V., & Spada, M. M. (2020). "The COVID-19 anxiety syndrome scale: Development and psychometric properties". Psychiatry Research, 292, 113322.
- Spada, M. M. (2014). "An overview of problematic Internet use". Addictive Behaviors, 39, 3-6.
- Spada, M. M., Caselli, G., Nikčević, A. V., & Wells, A. (2015). "Metacognition in addictive behaviors". Addictive Behaviors, 44, 9-15.
- Spada, M. M., Caselli, G., & Wells, A. (2013). "A triphasic metacognitive formulation of problem drinking". Clinical Psychology & Psychotherapy, 20(6), 494-500.
- Spada, M. M., & Wells, A. (2005). "Metacognitions, emotion and alcohol use". Clinical Psychology & Psychotherapy, 12(2), 150-155.
