= Mondo González =

Mental and performance coach & founder of Cheatcode and Cheatcode foundation

- Born: Armando González
- Education: Sacramento State University; Alliant International University
- Occupations: Mental health and fitness coach
- Known for: His work with Dansby Swanson, Lindsey Vonn, and Chris Godwin

Armando "Mondo" González, who markets himself as Dr. Mondo, is an American mental health and performance coach. He is the founder of Cheatcode and Cheatcode Foundation.

== Biography ==
González earned a Bachelor of Science degree in psychology from Sacramento State University and holds a doctorate in psychology with a specialization in marriage and family therapy from Alliant International University. His interest in sports psychology was initially sparked by the career of Chuck Knoblauch, a former MLB player whose performance notably declined after transferring to the New York Yankees in 1998. This observation, made during González's teenage years in Sacramento, California, influenced his subsequent career path.

Professionally trained as a licensed marriage and family therapist, González later specialized in brainspotting, a psychotherapeutic method he studied under brainspotting founder, Dr. David Grand. This technique, based on the concept that eye positions can impact emotional states, has become a central component of his practice, particularly in treating athletes with performance-related anxieties, including the yips.

González's approach often involves addressing underlying psychological issues contributing to performance declines. For example, he worked with Dansby Swanson, a Chicago Cubs shortstop, to address anxieties related to being a high draft pick and subsequent trade experiences. González has also worked with various professional athletes, including Lindsey Vonn and Chris Godwin. He also holds a tenure with the Tennessee Titans under head coach Mike Vrabel. In the NFL, his work includes addressing performance anxiety issues, such as repeated penalties for false starts. His methodology integrates brainspotting with other therapeutic techniques, customized to the individual needs of each athlete.
