= Bilateral sound =

Bilateral sound is a type of bilateral stimulation used in eye movement desensitization and reprocessing (EMDR) in the same manner as eye movement. It has been reported to enhance visualization and hypnosis, but this has received little attention in research. Essentially, the sound moves back and forth across the stereo field at a steady rhythm. In this regard, bilateral sound has been used in commercial recordings, and has been applied manually with the use of an electronic metronome or other means. Controversies regarding this and other forms of bilateral stimulation are discussed in the article on EMDR.

== Other fields ==
In other fields, the words bilateral and sound may be found together, but not necesserality referring to a pattern of sound as in the above use of the phrase.

In medicine, bilateral sound can refer to a type of sound coming from both sides of the body, as in crepitus from temporomandibular joint (TMJ) syndrome when it occurs on both sides of the TMJ. In this case, bilateral is an anatomical term.

In cochlear implant technology, bilateral sound refers to the provision of a different sound input for each ear to help the patient localize and interpret the sound.

In analog optical sound recording technology applications such as that used to provide audio for film, bilateral sound production makes use of two mirror-image tracks of light and dark patterns that are designed to avoid sound distortion where light may not adequately illuminate the full width of an area of the tracks.
