= Addictive Behaviors =

- Discipline: Addiction, clinical psychology, substance abuse
- Language: English
- Edited by: Marcantonio M. Spada

Publication details
- History: 1975–present
- Publisher: Elsevier
- Frequency: Monthly
- Impact factor: 4.1 (2025)

Standard abbreviations
- ISO 4: Addictive Behav.
- NLM: Addict Behav

Indexing
- CODEN: ADBEDS
- ISSN: 0306-4603 (print); 1873-6327 (web)
- OCLC no.: 1343464

Links
- Journal homepage; Online access

Addictive Behaviors is a monthly peer-reviewed scientific journal published by Elsevier. It was established in 1975 by Peter M. Miller (Medical University of South Carolina), who remained at the helm of the journal until December 2017. The current editor-in-chief is Marcantonio M. Spada (London South Bank University), who took over from Miller in January 2018. The journal covers behavioral and psychosocial research concerning addictive behaviors in its widest sense.

== Abstracting and indexing ==
The journal is abstracted and indexed in:

- Biological Abstracts
- BIOSIS Previews
- CAB Abstracts
- CINAHL
- Current Contents/Social and Behavioral Sciences
- EBSCO databases
- Elsevier Biobase
- Embase
- Index Medicus/MEDLINE/PubMed
- PsycINFO
- Science Citation Index Expanded
- Scopus
- Social Sciences Citation Index

According to the Journal Citation Reports, the journal has a 2025 impact factor of 4.1.
