= Patricia Resick =

American researcher

Patricia A. Resick is an American researcher in the field of post traumatic stress disorder. She is known for developing cognitive processing therapy.

== Biography ==
After earning her doctorate from the University of Georgia in 1976, Resick served as Assistant to Associate Professor at the University of South Dakota, 1976-1980, and Associate to Full Professor at the University of Missouri-St. Louis, 1981–2003.

She developed cognitive processing therapy (CPT) in 1988 at the University of Missouri-St. Louis where she conducted an open trial, the first treatment manual and a randomized controlled trial. She has subsequently worked with Candice M. Monson and Kathleen M. Chard among others to refine and further test the approach. While at this university, Resick supervised Sherry Falsetti on her doctoral dissertation. Together they developed the Modified PTSD Symptom Scale (MPSS).

Also while in Saint Louis, she developed the Center for Trauma Recovery and was awarded an endowed Curators' Professorship in 2000.

In 2003 she moved to Boston as Director of the Women’s Health Sciences Division of the National Center for PTSD at the VA Boston Healthcare System, which she held for a decade. Also in 2004, she became a professor of psychiatry at Boston University. In 2006 she initiated a program to disseminate CPT throughout the VA.

Resick was elected to the board of directors of the Association for the Advancement of Behavior Therapy (AABT) from 1992 to 1995. The organisation was then renamed the Association of Behavioral and Cognitive Therapies (ABCT), and she was elected its President in 2003–04. She also served on the board of directors of the International Society for Traumatic Stress Studies (ISTSS) from 1997 to 2003. In 2009, she was elected President of the ISTSS.

In 2013, she moved to Duke University in Durham. She is currently the Professor of Psychiatry and Behavioral Sciences at Duke University Medical Center, and a member of the American Board of Professional Psychology.

Resick was an Associate Editor for the Journal of Consulting and Clinical Psychology. She was on two sub-workgroups for the DSM-5.

Resick has published over 300 articles and chapters and 10 books.

== Honors ==
- 2003–2004, President of the Association of Behavioural and Cognitive Therapies (ABCT).
- 2004, Robert S. Laufer Memorial Award for Outstanding Scientific Achievement from the International Society for Traumatic Stress Studies (ISTSS).
- 2009, President of the ISTSS.
- 2009, Leadership Award by the Association for VA Psychologist Leaders.
- 2012, Outstanding Contributions by an Individual for Educational/Training Activities presented by the ABCT.
- 2013, Lifetime Achievement Award from Division 56 (Trauma Psychology) of the American Psychological Association.
- 2019, Lifetime Achievement Award from the ISTSS.
