= Imagery rescripting =

Therapeutic technique

Imagery Rescripting is an experiential therapeutic technique that uses imagery and imagination to intervene in traumatic memories. The process is guided by a therapist who works with the client to define ways to work with particular traumatic memories, images, or nightmares.

Within an Imagery Rescripting session, the therapist will guide the client to revisit the memory they are working with. At a key point in the memory, either the client or the therapist will intervene in the image/memory. The intervention may involve regaining control over the event, creating new outcomes, or re-establishing power over the narrative of the event. The aim is to connect to the client's unmet core needs resulting from the memory/experience.

== Treatment and application ==
Imagery Rescripting has been shown to be effective in the treatment of PTSD resulting from childhood traumas.

It is an experiential technique that involves actively working with mental images rather than simply talking about what happened. Imagery Rescripting works directly with causes of trauma to restructure systems of implicational meaning that perpetuate symptoms of PTSD, trigger emotional distress, and cause maladaptive behaviors. When Imagery Rescripting successfully changes the core meaning of traumatic memories, new neural pathways are created which facilitate changes in negative schemas, core belief systems, and behaviors.

Like EMDR, Imagery Rescripting can be an effective trauma treatment without the need for prolonged exposure to traumatic experiences within the therapeutic process.

== History ==
The use of imagery as a therapeutic practice has been developed through various traditions and developed into an empirically validated practice. These traditions include hypnosis, psychoanalysis, the Gestalt, and CBT.

Pierre Janet pioneered the use of Imagery Substitution in 1889. He used hypnosis to help clients reimagine traumatic events as positive experiences. Hanscarl Leuner developed Guided Affective Imagery as part of his therapeutic model. Guided Affective Imagery uses specific images to lead the client into a trance state. The varied image-scapes that appeared in this state helped Leuner's clients to summon different emotions to work with clinically.

Imagery was central to the Gestalt movement. Fritz Perls began his sessions by having the client invoke images from dreams or visualizations. Perls used this imagery to define an aspect of the patient that could communicate from deeper levels of their subconscious.

Aaron Beck adapted Perls's technique in his cognitive therapy group in the early 1980s. This brought imagery into mainstream therapeutic circles. The method was fine-tuned through its use in cognitive therapy for PTSD, CBT for nightmares, and schema therapy for personality disorders.
