= Psychology of Men & Masculinities =

- Discipline: Psychology
- Language: English
- Edited by: Y. Joel Wong, PhD

Publication details
- Former name(s): Psychology of Men and Masculinity
- History: 2000–present
- Publisher: American Psychological Association (United States)
- Frequency: Quarterly
- Impact factor: 2.948 (2020)

Standard abbreviations
- ISO 4: Psychol. Men Masculinities

Indexing
- ISSN: 1524-9220 (print); 1939-151X (web)
- LCCN: sn99008604
- OCLC no.: 474575489

Links
- Journal homepage; Online archive

Psychology of Men & Masculinities (originally Psychology of Men & Masculinity) is a peer-reviewed academic journal published by the American Psychological Association on behalf of Division 51. The journal was established in 2000 and covers research on "how boys' and men's psychology is influenced and shaped by both gender and sex, and encompasses the study of the social construction of gender, sex differences and similarities, and biological processes." The current editor-in-chief is Y. Joel Wong, PhD.

== Abstracting and indexing ==
The journal is abstracted and indexed in the Social Sciences Citation Index, Scopus, PsycINFO, Current Contents/Social & Behavioral Sciences, and CINAHL Plus. According to the Journal Citation Reports, the journal has a 2020 impact factor of 2.948.
