= PTSD treatment in South Africa =

PTSD treatment In South Africa arose to treat the victims of physical violence and sexual abuse, who often display symptoms of post-traumatic stress disorder (PTSD).

== PTSD incidence ==
Women may be especially likely to suffer from PTSD as a result of sexual abuse or contracting HIV. PTSD in turn may prevent women from seeking HIV treatment. Rates of HIV in South Africa are high. PTSD in a pregnant woman may lead to complications during pregnancy and childbirth. Childhood trauma may also increase the risk of PTSD. This trauma may be physical, sexual, or emotional in nature. Rates of crime and violence are high in many poor areas of South African cities. Exposure to violence and drug abuse leads to increased PTSD among South African men, and this in turn leads to increased rates of violent crime among young South African men due to increased aggression. PTSD may also further exacerbate drug abuse due to attempts to self-medicate.

== Treatment ==
Treatment methods include cognitive therapy. Alternatively, a multi-modal integrated system of treatment can be employed. New treatment systems may involve using a grading system which allows the person to receive a letter ranging from A-E which determines the severity of that specific persons treatment. Other treatment options involve "virtual reality simulations" to make it seem more realistic and "to beef up their effectiveness". "Stress-inoculation training, another form of CBT, where practitioners teach clients techniques to manage and reduce anxiety, such as breathing, muscle relaxation and positive self-talk". There are many different up and coming treatment options for those suffering with PTSD, each needing their own specific treatment type due to their severity. With more research being drawn to PTSD, it is becoming a more viewed topic by many.

== See also ==
- Mental health care in South Africa
- Sexual violence in South Africa
