= Metacognitive therapy =

Psychotherapy aimed at helping clients to a better approach to their negative thoughts

Metacognitive therapy (MCT) is a psychotherapy focused on modifying metacognitive beliefs that perpetuate states of worry, rumination and attention fixation. It was created by Adrian Wells based on an information processing model by Wells and Gerald Matthews. It is supported by scientific evidence from a large number of studies.

The goals of MCT are first to discover what patients believe about their own thoughts and about how their mind works (called metacognitive beliefs), then to show the patient how these beliefs lead to unhelpful responses to thoughts that serve to unintentionally prolong or worsen symptoms, and finally to provide alternative ways of responding to thoughts in order to allow a reduction of symptoms. In clinical practice, MCT is most commonly used for treating anxiety disorders such as social anxiety disorder, generalised anxiety disorder (GAD), health anxiety, obsessive–compulsive disorder (OCD) and post-traumatic stress disorder (PTSD) as well as depression – though the model was designed to be transdiagnostic (meaning it focuses on common psychological factors thought to maintain all psychological disorders).

== History ==
Metacognition, Greek for "more comprehensive or transcending" (meta) "thought" (cognition), refers to the human capacity to be aware of and control one's own thoughts and internal mental processes. Metacognition has been studied for several decades by researchers, originally as part of developmental psychology and neuropsychology. Examples of metacognition include a person knowing what thoughts are currently in their mind and knowing where the focus of their attention is, and a person's beliefs about their own thoughts (which may or may not be accurate). The first metacognitive interventions were devised for children with attentional disorders in the 1980s.

== Model of mental disorders ==
=== Self-regulatory executive function model ===
In the metacognitive model, symptoms are caused by a set of psychological processes called the cognitive attentional syndrome (CAS). The CAS includes three main processes, each of which constitutes extended thinking in response to negative thoughts. These three processes are:

1. Worry/rumination
2. Threat monitoring
3. Coping behaviours that backfire

All three are driven by patients' metacognitive beliefs, such as the belief that these processes will help to solve problems, although the processes all ultimately have the unintentional consequence of prolonging distress. Of particular importance in the model are negative metacognitive beliefs, especially those concerning the uncontrollability and dangerousness of some thoughts. Executive functions are also believed to play a part in how the person can focus and refocus on certain thoughts and mental modes. These mental modes can be categorized as object mode and metacognitive mode, which refers to the different types of relationships people can have towards thoughts. All of the CAS, the metacognitive beliefs, the mental modes and the executive function together constitute the self-regulatory executive function model (S-REF). This is also known as the metacognitive model. In more recent work, Wells has described in greater detail a metacognitive control system of the S-REF aimed at advancing research and treatment using metacognitive therapy.

== Therapeutic intervention ==
MCT is a time-limited therapy which usually takes place between 8–12 sessions. The therapist uses discussions with the patient to discover their metacognitive beliefs, experiences and strategies. The therapist then shares the model with the patient, pointing out how their particular symptoms are caused and maintained.

Therapy then proceeds with the introduction of techniques tailored to the patient's difficulties aimed at changing how the patient relates to thoughts and that bring extended thinking under control. Experiments are used to challenge metacognitive beliefs (e.g. "You believe that if you worry too much you will go 'mad' – let's try worrying as much as possible for the next five minutes and see if there is any effect") and strategies such as attentional training technique, situational attention refocusing and detached mindfulness (this is a distinct strategy from various other mindfulness techniques).

== Research ==
Clinical trials (including randomized controlled trials) have found MCT to produce large clinically significant improvements across a range of mental health disorders, although as of 2014 the total number of subjects studied is small and a meta-analysis concluded that further study is needed before strong conclusions can be drawn regarding effectiveness. A 2015 special issue of the journal Cognitive Therapy and Research was devoted to MCT research findings.

A 2018 meta-analysis confirmed the effectiveness of MCT in the treatment of a variety of psychological complaints with depression and anxiety showing high effect sizes. It concluded, "Our findings indicate that MCT is an effective treatment for a range of psychological complaints. To date, strongest evidence exists for anxiety and depression. Current results suggest that MCT may be superior to other psychotherapies, including cognitive behavioral interventions. However, more trials with larger number of participants are needed in order to draw firm conclusions."

In 2020, a study showed superior effectiveness in MCT over cognitive behavioral therapy (CBT) in the treatment of depression. It summarised, "MCT appears promising and might offer a necessary advance in depression treatment, but there is insufficient evidence at present from adequately powered trials to assess the relative efficacy of MCT compared with CBT in depression."

In 2018–2020, a research topic in the journal Frontiers in Psychology highlighted the growing experimental, clinical, and neuropsychological evidence base for MCT.

A recent network meta-analysis indicated that MCT (and cognitive processing therapy) might be superior to other psychological treatments for PTSD. However, although the evidence-base for MCT is promising and growing, most clinical trials investigating MCT are characterized by small and select samples and potential conflict of interests as its originator is involved in most clinical trials conducted. As such, there is a pressing need for larger, preferably pragmatic, well-conducted randomized controlled trials, conducted by independent trialists without potential conflict of interests before there is a large scale implementation of MCT in community mental health clinics.

== See also ==
- Meta-cognitions questionnaire
