= Eye movement desensitization and reprocessing =

Form of psychotherapy

Eye movement desensitization and reprocessing (EMDR) is a form of psychotherapy designed to treat post-traumatic stress disorder (PTSD). Devised by Francine Shapiro in 1987, it involves talking about traumatic memories while engaging in side-to-side eye movements or other forms of bilateral stimulation. It is also used for some other psychological conditions.

EMDR is recommended for the treatment of PTSD by various government and medical bodies citing varying levels of evidence, including the World Health Organization, the UK National Institute for Health and Care Excellence, the Australian National Health and Medical Research Council, and the US Departments of Veterans Affairs and Defense. The American Psychological Association does not endorse EMDR as a first-line treatment, but indicates that it is probably effective for treating adult PTSD.

Systematic analyses published since 2013 generally indicate that EMDR treatment efficacy for adults with PTSD is equivalent to trauma-focused cognitive and behavioral therapies (TF-CBT), such as prolonged exposure therapy (PE) and cognitive processing therapy (CPT). However, bilateral stimulation does not substantially contribute to treatment effectiveness, if at all. The predominant therapeutic factors in EMDR and TF-CBT are exposure and various components of cognitive-behavioral therapy.

Because eye movements and other bilateral stimulation techniques do not uniquely contribute to EMDR treatment efficacy, EMDR has been characterized as a purple hat therapy. That is, its effectiveness is due to the same therapeutic methods found in other evidence-based psychotherapies for PTSD, namely exposure therapy and CBT techniques, without any contribution from its distinctive add-ons.

== Technique ==
EMDR is typically undertaken in a series of sessions with a trained therapist. The number of sessions can vary depending on the progress made. A typical EMDR therapy session lasts from 60 to 90 minutes.

The person being treated is asked to recall an image, phrase, and emotion that represent a level of distress related to a trigger while generating one of several types of bilateral sensory input, such as side-to-side eye movements or hand tapping. The 2013 World Health Organization practice guideline says that "Like cognitive behavioral therapy (CBT) with a trauma focus, EMDR aims to reduce subjective distress and strengthen adaptive beliefs related to the traumatic event. Unlike CBT with a trauma focus, EMDR does not involve (a) detailed descriptions of the event, (b) direct challenging of beliefs, (c) extended exposure or (d) homework."

== Possible mechanisms ==
=== Incomplete processing of experiences in trauma ===
Many proposals of EMDR efficacy assume, as Shapiro posited, that when a traumatic or very negative event occurs, the information processing of the experience in memory may be incomplete. The trauma disrupts normal adaptive information processing, leading to unprocessed information being dysfunctionally retained in memory networks. According to the 2013 World Health Organization practice guideline: "This therapy [EMDR] is based on the idea that negative thoughts, feelings and behaviours are the result of unprocessed memories." This proposed mechanism has no known scientific basis.

=== Other mechanisms ===
Several other possible mechanisms have been proposed:

- EMDR may affect working memory. If a patient performs a bilateral stimulation task while remembering the trauma, the amount of information they can recall is thought to be reduced, making the resulting negative emotions less intense and more bearable. This is seen by Robin Logie of the EMDR Association UK and Ireland as a "distancing effect". The client is then believed to re-evaluate the trauma and process it in a less-harmful environment. This explanation is plausible, given research showing that memories are more modifiable once recalled.
- Horizontal eye movement is thought to trigger an "orienting response" in the brain, used in scanning the environment for threats and opportunities.
- Eye movement is thought to prompt communication between the two sides of the brain. This idea is not grounded in accepted neuroscience.

=== Bilateral stimulation, including eye movement ===
Bilateral stimulation is a generalization of the left- and right-repetitive eye movement technique first used by Shapiro. Alternative stimuli include auditory stimuli alternating between left- and right-sided speakers or headphones, and physical stimuli such as the therapist's hand tapping or tapping devices.

Most meta-analyses have found that including bilateral eye movements in EMDR makes little or no difference to its effect. Meta-analyses have also described a high risk of allegiance bias in EMDR studies. One 2013 meta-analysis with fewer exclusion criteria found a moderate effect.

== History ==
EMDR was invented by Francine Shapiro in 1987. In a workshop, Shapiro related how the idea of the therapy came to her while she was taking a walk in the woods, and discerned she had been able to cope better with disturbing thoughts when also experiencing saccadic eye movements.

Psychologist Gerald Rosen has expressed doubt about this description, saying that people are normally not aware of this type of eye movement. Rosen has suggested that instead EMDR arose out of Shapiro's previous experience as a practitioner of the pseudoscientific therapy neuro-linguistic programming, which also used eye-movement patterns in the 1980s when Shapiro was practicing.

== Research ==
=== Effectiveness ===
EMDR has been found to be as effective as other psychological interventions for treating PTSD, with no evidence of added benefit derived from eye movement. Men are more likely to drop out of an EMDR program than women.

A 2023 Cochrane systematic review analyzed psychosocial interventions for survivors of rape and sexual assault experienced during adulthood and concluded that EMDR is a "first-line treatment" for PTSD along with other trauma-focused psychotherapies, such as Cognitive Processing Therapy and Prolonged Exposure.

=== Client experience ===
A 2021 systematic review of 13 studies found that clients had mixed perceptions of the effectiveness of EMDR therapy.

=== Treating conditions other than PTSD ===
EMDR has been tested on a variety of other mental health conditions with mixed results.

- A 2021 systematic review and meta-analysis found EMDR to have a moderate benefit in treating depression, but the number and quality of the studies were low.
- Positive effects have also been shown for certain anxiety disorders, but the number of studies was low and the risk of bias high. The American Psychological Association describes EMDR as "ineffective" for the treatment of panic disorder.
- EMDR has been found to cause strong effects on dissociative identity disorder patients, leading to recommendations for adjusted use.
- A 2023 systematic review of evidence found EMDR's effectiveness in treating mental health conditions of children and adolescents who have been sexually abused is limited.

== Professional practice guidelines ==
- The Institute of Medicine's 2008 report on the treatment of PTSD found insufficient evidence to recommend EMDR, and criticized many of the available studies for methodological flaws including allegiance bias and insufficient controls.
- The Dutch National Steering Committee on Mental Health Care has released multidisciplinary guidelines which describe "insufficient scientific evidence" to support EMDR in the acute period following a stressful event (2008), but recommend EMDR's use in chronic PTSD (2003).
- The World Health Organization's 2013 report on stress-related conditions found insufficient evidence to support EMDR for acute symptoms of traumatic stress. Its 2023 guideline for mental, neurological and substance use disorders recommended EMDR with moderate evidence for adults and children in treating PTSD.
- The Australian 2013 National Health and Medical Research Council guidelines recommend EMDR for the treatment of PTSD in adults with its highest grade of evidence, noting that "EMDR now includes most of the core elements of standard trauma-focussed CBT (TF-CBT)" and "the two variants of trauma-focussed therapy are not statistically different."
- As of 2017, the American Psychological Association "conditionally recommends" EMDR for the treatment of PTSD in adults, meaning its use is suggested rather than recommended.
- A 2017 joint report from the US Departments of Veterans Affairs and Defense describes the evidence for EMDR in the treatment of PTSD as "strong."
- The UK National Institute for Health and Care Excellence's 2018 PTSD guidelines found low-to-very-low evidence of efficacy for EMDR in treating PTSD, but what was available justified recommending it for non-combat-related trauma.
- The 2018 International Society for Traumatic Stress Studies practice guidelines "strongly recommend" EMDR as an effective treatment for post-traumatic stress symptoms.

== Criticism ==
EMDR is controversial among scholars in the psychological community. It is used by some practitioners during trauma therapy and in the treatment of complex post-traumatic stress disorder.

EMDR has been called a purple hat therapy on the grounds that its effectiveness stems from its underlying mainstream therapy (or the standard treatment), not from its distinctive features.

EMDR adds a number of techniques that do not appear to contribute to therapeutic effectiveness (e.g., bilateral stimulation). EMDR is classified as one of the "power therapies" alongside thought field therapy, Emotional Freedom Techniques, and others—so called because these therapies are marketed as being superior to established the therapies which preceded them.

EMDR has been characterized as pseudoscience because the underlying theory and primary therapeutic mechanism are non-falsifiable and non-scientific. EMDR's founder and other practitioners have used untestable hypotheses to explain studies that show no effect. The results of the therapy are non-specific, especially if directed eye movements are irrelevant to the results. When these movements are removed, what remains is a broadly therapeutic interaction and deceptive marketing. According to neurologist and skeptic Steven Novella:

[T]he false specificity of these treatments is a massive clinical distraction. Time and effort are wasted clinically in studying, perfecting, and using these methods, rather than focusing on the components of the interaction that actually work.

Furthermore, Novella argues that investigation into EMDR has been characterised by poor-quality studies rather than tightly controlled trials that could justify or falsify the mechanisms proposed to support it. Novella writes that the research quantity nevertheless means that EMDR has claimed a place among accepted treatments and is "not likely going away anytime soon, even though it is a house of cards built on nothing".

A parody website advertising "sudotherapy" created by a fictional "Fatima Shekel" appeared on the internet in the 1990s. Proponents of EMDR described the website as libelous, since the website contained an image of a pair of shifting eyes following a cat named "Sudo", and "Fatima Shekel" has the same initials as EMDR's founder, Francine Shapiro. However, no legal action took place against the website or its founders.

== Society and culture ==
- Sandra Bullock used EMDR following a home invasion by a stalker in 2014.
- In 2019, Jameela Jamil said she partook in EMDR therapy to treat her post traumatic stress disorder.
- In 2021, Prince Harry took a course of EMDR and filmed a session for Oprah Winfrey during a mental health television documentary.
- In 2022, BBC war correspondent Fergal Keane, who suffered from PTSD, credited his EMDR therapist with helping save his life.

== See also ==
- Abreaction
- List of topics characterized as pseudoscience
- Management of post-traumatic stress disorder
