= Purple hat therapy =

Therapy crediting an unlikely new addition rather than established effective therapy

In imaginary purple hat therapy, a person being treated is required to wear a purple hat, but it is not responsible for any effectiveness the treatment has.

Purple hat therapy refers to any medical practice in which an established form of therapy is mixed with an unlikely new addition (such as wearing a purple hat) and then is claimed to be effective because of the new addition, when in fact the effectiveness is due to the established component.

== Origin and description ==
The term "purple hat therapy" was coined by Gerald Rosen and Gerald Davison in their 2003 paper, Psychology should list empirically supported principles of change (ESPs) and not credential trademarked therapies or other treatment packages. The therapy is accepted as effective because it is assessed overall; the additional element of the "purple hat" is not tested as distinct and does not need to prove its extra worth. Its invention is followed by the publication of papers discussing it and special training courses.

In addition to introducing unnecessary elements into the treatment, purple hat therapies can hinder the scientific understanding of effective treatments for the condition in question.

== Application ==
Purple hat therapy has been used as an analogue for eye movement desensitization and reprocessing since it takes established exposure therapy and adds non-science based activities such as eye movement as a "purple hat".

== See also ==
- Fallacy of composition

== Sources ==
- Herbert JD (2003). "The Science and Practice of Empirically Supported Treatments". Behavior Modification. 27 (3). SAGE Publications: 412–430. doi:10.1177/0145445503027003008. ISSN 0145-4455. PMID 12841591. S2CID 16489384.
- Mercer J (7 March 2019). "Chapter 12: Trauma and attachment". In Hupp S (ed.). Pseudoscience in Child and Adolescent Psychotherapy: A Skeptical Field Guide. Cambridge University Press. pp. 172–188. ISBN 9781107175310.
- Neudeck P, Wittchen HU (2012). "Chapter 1: Introduction: Rethinking the Model – Refining the Method". In Neudeck P, Wittchen HU (eds.). Exposure Therapy (1st ed.). Springer. doi:10.1007/978-1-4614-3342-2_1. ISBN 978-1-4614-3341-5.
- Rosen GM, Davison GC (July 2003). "Psychology should list empirically supported principles of change (ESPs) and not credential trademarked therapies or other treatment packages". Behav Modif. 27 (3): 300–12. doi:10.1177/0145445503027003003. PMID 12841586. S2CID 19587519.
- Rosquist (2005). Exposure Treatments for Anxiety Disorders: A Practitioner's Guide to Concepts, Methods, and Evidence-Based Practice. Routledge. ISBN 9781136915772.
- Tolin DF (2020). "Advances in the identification of empirically supported psychological treatments". Clinical Psychology: Science and Practice. 27 (4). American Psychological Association (APA). doi:10.1111/cpsp.12356. ISSN 1468-2850. S2CID 225700536.
- Tryon WT (2014). Cognitive Neuroscience And Psychotherapy – Network Principles for a Unified Theory. Elsevier. ISBN 9780124200982.
