= Adrian Wells =

British clinical psychologist

- Education: University of Pennsylvania; Aston University; Aston Business School; Leeds School of Medicine
- Scientific career
- Fields: Clinical psychology
- Workplaces: University of Manchester; Norwegian University of Science and Technology
- Doctoral students: Marcantonio M. Spada

Adrian Wells, CPsychol, FBPsS is a British clinical psychologist who is the creator of metacognitive therapy. He is Professor of Clinical and Experimental Psychopathology at the University of Manchester, U.K. and is also Professor II of Clinical Psychology at the Norwegian University of Science and Technology.

== Research ==
Wells has contributed to the understanding of mechanisms underlying vulnerability to psychological disorders, the maintenance of mental health problems and their treatment. His work has informed the areas of social anxiety disorder, generalised anxiety disorder, trauma reactions (such as post-traumatic stress disorder), obsessive–compulsive disorder and depression. His research has particularly focused on developing models and treatment for these disorders using cognitive behavioural therapy and metacognitive therapy. He has authored over 200 publications in books and peer-reviewed journals.

== Key publications ==
Wells' first book Attention and Emotion: A Clinical Perspective (co-authored with Gerald Matthews) presented a critique and framework for applying cognitive psychology to the understanding of psychopathology. It was awarded the 1998 British Psychological Society Book Award for significant contributions to psychology and remains a definitive text in this field, recently being reprinted for a 20th anniversary edition.

Wells has authored a comprehensive treatment manual for anxiety disorders using cognitive behavioural therapy, which is widely used in U.K. mental health settings and includes a model and treatment for social anxiety disorder (developed with D. M. Clark) which was recommended by the National Institute for Health and Care Excellence as the most effective treatment.

Wells is the originator of metacognitive therapy, a new psychological treatment which is undergoing extensive evaluation in controlled trials. He has written a treatment manual for the application of this model and treatment to anxiety and mood disorders.
