= Journal of Traumatic Stress =

- Discipline: Clinical psychology
- Language: English
- Edited by: Denise M. Sloan

Publication details
- History: 1988-present
- Publisher: Wiley-Blackwell on behalf of the International Society for Traumatic Stress Studies
- Frequency: Bimonthly
- Impact factor: 2.721 (2011)

Standard abbreviations
- ISO 4: J. Trauma. Stress

Indexing
- CODEN: JTSTEB
- ISSN: 0894-9867 (print); 1573-6598 (web)
- LCCN: 88648218
- OCLC no.: 16389067

Links
- Journal homepage; Online access; Online archive

The Journal of Traumatic Stress (JTS) is a peer-reviewed academic journal published bimonthly by Wiley-Blackwell on behalf of the International Society for Traumatic Stress Studies.

== Overview ==
As of 2021, the editor-in-chief is Denise M. Sloan (Behavioral Science Division, National Center for PTSD, VA Boston Healthcare System, and Boston University Chobanian & Avedisian School of Medicine). The journal covers research on the biopsychosocial aspects of trauma and publishes original articles, brief reports, reviews, commentaries, and special issues devoted to single topics.

== Impact factor ==
According to the Journal Citation Reports, the journal has a 2011 impact factor of 2.721, ranking it 22nd out of 109 journals in the category "Psychology, Clinical" and 32nd out of 117 journals in the category "Psychiatry (Social Science)".
