= Cognitive processing therapy =

Psychotherapeutic approach

Cognitive processing therapy (CPT) is a manualized therapy used by clinicians to help people recover from post-traumatic stress disorder (PTSD) and related conditions. It includes elements of cognitive behavioral therapy (CBT) treatments, one of the most widely used evidence-based therapies. A typical 12-session run of CPT has proven effective in treating PTSD across a variety of populations, including combat veterans, sexual assault victims, and refugees. Sometimes, a patient may need up to 20 sessions to be effective. CPT can be provided in individual and group treatment formats and is considered one of the most effective treatments for PTSD. A 2018 systemic review found CPT to be moderately effective in treating PTSD compared to other modalities.

The theory behind CPT conceptualizes PTSD as a disorder of non-recovery, in which a sufferer's beliefs about the causes and consequences of traumatic events produce strong negative emotions, which prevent accurate processing of the traumatic memory and the emotions resulting from the events. Because the emotions are often overwhelmingly negative and difficult to cope with, PTSD sufferers can block the natural recovery process by using avoidance of traumatic triggers as a strategy to function in day-to-day living. Unfortunately, this limits their opportunities to process the traumatic experience and gain a more adaptive understanding of it. CPT incorporates trauma-specific cognitive techniques to help individuals with PTSD more accurately appraise these "stuck points" and progress toward recovery.

== History ==
Development of CPT began in 1988 with work by Patricia Resick. Initial randomized controlled trials for treatment of PTSD were conducted by Candice M. Monson.

In 2007, the Veteran's Health Administration began implementing CPT in an effort to improve PTSD treatment for veterans. Following increased efforts, there was a mandate in 2012 to ensure all veterans have access to CPT within Veteran Affair mental health facilities.

== Phases of treatment ==
The primary focus of the treatment is to help the client understand and reconceptualize their traumatic event in a way that reduces its ongoing negative effects on their current life. Decreasing avoidance of the trauma is crucial to this, since it is necessary for the client to examine and evaluate their meta-emotions and beliefs generated by the trauma.

The first phase consists of education regarding PTSD, thoughts, and emotions. The therapist seeks to develop rapport with, and gain the co-operation of, the client by establishing a common understanding of the client's problems and outlining the cognitive theory of PTSD development and maintenance. The therapist asks the client to write an impact statement to establish a current baseline of the client's understanding of why the event occurred and the impact that it has had on their beliefs about themselves, others, and the world. This phase focuses on identifying automatic thoughts and increasing awareness of the relationship between a person's thoughts and feelings. A specific focus is on teaching the client to identify maladaptive beliefs ("stuck points") that interfere with recovery from traumatic experiences.

The next phase involves formal processing of the trauma. The therapist asks the client to write a detailed account of their worst traumatic experience, which the client then reads to the therapist in session. This is intended to break the pattern of avoidance and enable emotional processing to take place, with the ultimate goal being for the client to clarify and modify their cognitive distortions. Clinicians often use Socratic questioning to gently prompt the client, based on the idea that the client's own arrival at new cognitions about their trauma, as opposed to unquestioning acceptance of the clinician's interpretations, is critical to recovery. Alternatively, CPT can be conducted without the use of written accounts (in a variant known as CPT-Cognitive, or CPT-C), which some clinicians have found to be equally effective and perhaps more efficient. This alternative method relies almost entirely on Socratic dialogue between the therapist and client.

The final phase of treatment focuses on helping the client reinforce the skills they learned in the previous phase, with the intent that they can use those skills to further identify, evaluate, and modify their beliefs concerning their traumatic events. The intent is to allow the clients to exit treatment with the confidence and ability to use adaptive coping strategies in their post-treatment lives. This phase focuses on five conceptual areas that traumatic experiences most frequently cause damage to: safety, trust, power/control, esteem, and intimacy. Clients practice recognizing how their traumatic experiences resulted in over-generalized beliefs, as well as the impact of these beliefs on current functioning and quality of life.

== Therapy elements ==
=== Four essential parts ===
- Educating the patient about the specific post-traumatic stress disorder (PTSD) symptoms and the way the treatment will help them.
- Informing the patient about their thoughts and feelings.
- Imparting lessons to the patient to help them develop skills to challenge or question their own thoughts.
- Helping the patient to recognize changes in their beliefs that happened after going through the traumatic event.

=== Structure of CPT individual sessions ===
- Twelve 50–60 minute structured sessions
- Sessions typically conducted once or twice weekly
- Patients complete out-of-session practice assignments
- 2 Formats:
1. CPT includes a brief written trauma account component, along with ongoing practice of cognitive techniques
2. CPT-C omits the written trauma account, and includes more practice of cognitive techniques

=== Structure of CPT group sessions ===
- Twelve 90–120 minute structured group sessions
- Typically conducted by two clinicians
- 8–10 patients per group
- Patients complete out-of-session practice assignments
- 3 Formats:
1. CPT includes a brief written trauma account component, along with ongoing practice of cognitive techniques. The details of the written accounts are not shared during sessions, but the emotional and cognitive reactions identified while writing the account are processed by the group.
2. CPT-C omits the written trauma account, and includes more practice of cognitive techniques.
3. Individual and Group Combined includes practice assignments and the written trauma account, which are processed in additional individual therapy sessions.

== See also ==
- Cognitive behavioral therapy
- Post-traumatic stress disorder
