= International Society for Traumatic Stress Studies =

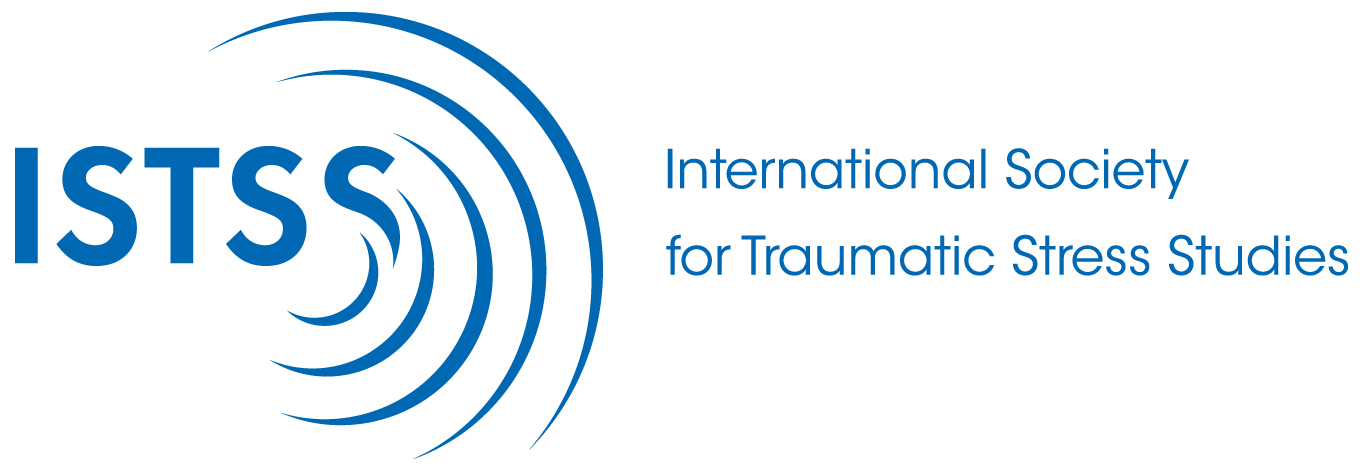
- Formation: 1985
- Type: Professional association
- Headquarters: Brentwood, Tennessee
- Members: 2409
- Executive director: Diane Elmore Borbon
- Website: https://istss.org/

The International Society for Traumatic Stress Studies is a professional association established on March 2, 1985, in Washington, D.C. It aims to disseminate the state of the science as it pertains to the effects of trauma.

== History ==
The organization was originally named the Society for Traumatic Stress Studies when it was established at a meeting organized by Charles Figley and held in Washington, D.C., in March 1985. A foundational objective of the society was to publish a journal featuring scholarly work on traumatic stress. This was achieved in July 1986 with the creation of the Journal of Traumatic Stress, whose first issue was published in January 1988. The society's first annual meeting was held in Atlanta, Georgia, in September 1985. In April 1990, the society's name was changed to the International Society for Traumatic Stress Studies to reflect its growing non-U.S. membership.

The first edition of its newsletter, StressPoints, which was published in 1986, started with an editorial commenting upon the diversity of opinion expressed in the press about the Space Shuttle Challenger disaster, expressing hope that "very soon we can create a national media registry. This would include those most of us would agree are qualified to comment on the psychosocial consequences of traumatic events . . . We hope that by providing the media with a list of qualified experts, the level of public information about human response to catastrophes will be increased substantially."
