= List of psychotherapies =

This is an alphabetical list of psychotherapies.

This list contains some approaches that may not call themselves a psychotherapy but have a similar aim of improving mental health and well-being through talk and other means of communication.

In the 20th century, a great number of psychotherapies were created. All of these face continuous change in popularity, methods, and effectiveness. Sometimes they are self-administered, either individually, in pairs, small groups or larger groups. However, a professional practitioner will usually use a combination of therapies and approaches, often in a team treatment process that involves reading/talking/reporting to other professional practitioners.

The older established therapies usually have a code of ethics, professional associations, training programs, and so on. The newer and innovative therapies may not yet have established these structures or may not wish to.

This list is a mixture of psychotherapy articles that cover topics at various levels of abstraction, such as theoretical frameworks, specific therapy packages, and individual techniques.

== A ==
- Abreaction therapy
- Accelerated experiential dynamic psychotherapy (AEDP)
- Acceptance and commitment therapy (ACT)
- Adlerian therapy
- Adventure therapy
- Analytical psychology
- Animal-assisted therapy
- Art therapy
- Association splitting
- Attack therapy
- Attachment-based psychotherapy
- Attachment-based therapy (children)
- Attachment therapy
- Autogenic training
- Aversion therapy

== B ==
- Behavioral activation
- Behavior modification
- Behavior therapy
- Bibliotherapy
- Biodynamic psychotherapy
- Bioenergetic analysis
- Biofeedback
- Body psychotherapy
- Bonding psychotherapy
- Brainspotting
- Brief psychotherapy

== C ==
- Classical Adlerian psychotherapy
- Chess therapy
- Child psychotherapy
- Christian counseling
- Clean language
- Client-centered psychotherapy
- Co-counselling
- Cognitive analytic therapy
- Cognitive behavioral analysis system of psychotherapy
- Cognitive behavioral therapy (CBT)
- Cognitive behavioral therapy for insomnia (CBT-I)
- Cognitive processing therapy (CPT)
- Cognitive therapy
- Coherence therapy
- Collaborative therapy
- Compassion-focused therapy (CFT)
- Concentrative movement therapy
- Contemplative psychotherapy
- Contextual therapy
- Conversational model
- Conversion therapy (pseudoscientific)
- Counting method
- Couples therapy
- Creative music therapy
- Cultural family therapy

== D ==
- Dance therapy or dance movement therapy (DMT)
- Daseinsanalysis
- Decoupling for body-focused repetitive behaviors
- Depth psychology
- Developmental eclecticism
- Developmental needs meeting strategy (DNMS)
- Dialectical behavior therapy (DBT)
- Dignity therapy
- Drama therapy
- Dreamwork
- Dyadic developmental psychotherapy (DDP)
- Dynamic deconstructive psychotherapy

== E ==
- Eastern Orthodox psychotherapy
- Eclectic psychotherapy
- Ecological counseling
- Ego-state therapy
- Emotionally focused therapy (EFT)
- Emotional Freedom Techniques, a pseudoscientific therapy
- Encounter groups
- Eye movement desensitization and reprocessing (EMDR)
- Existential therapy
- Exposure and response prevention
- Exposure therapy
- Expressive therapies

== F ==
- Family Constellations
- Family therapy
- Feminist therapy
- Focusing (psychotherapy)
- Forensic psychotherapy
- Freudian psychotherapy
- Functional analytic psychotherapy (FAP)
- Future-oriented therapy

== G ==
- Gay affirmative psychotherapy
- Gestalt therapy
- Gestalt theoretical psychotherapy
- Grief counseling
- Group analysis
- Group therapy
- Guided affective imagery

== H ==
- Habit reversal training
- Hagiotherapy
- Hakomi
- Heimler method of human social functioning
- Hip hop therapy
- Holotropic breathwork
- Holding therapy
- Humanistic psychology
- Human givens
- Hypnotherapy

== I ==
- Imago therapy
- Immersion therapy
- Inner Relationship Focusing
- Insight-oriented psychotherapy
- Institutional psychotherapy
- Integral psychotherapy
- Integrative body psychotherapy
- Integrative psychotherapy
- Intensive short-term dynamic psychotherapy
- Internal Family Systems Model
- Interpersonal psychoanalysis
- Interpersonal psychotherapy
- Interpersonal reconstructive therapy
- Individual psychotherapy

== J ==
- Journal therapy
- Jungian psychotherapy

== L ==
- Logic-based therapy
- Logotherapy

== M ==
- Marriage counseling
- MDMA-assisted psychotherapy
- Milieu therapy
- Mindfulness-based cognitive therapy
- Mindfulness-based stress reduction
- Mentalization-based treatment
- Metacognitive therapy
- Metacognitive training
- Metaphor therapy
- Method of levels (MOL)
- Mode deactivation therapy (MDT)
- Morita therapy
- Motivational enhancement therapy
- Motivational interviewing
- Multimodal therapy
- Multiple impact therapy
- Multisystemic therapy
- Multitheoretical psychotherapy
- Music therapy

== N ==
- Narrative exposure therapy
- Narrative therapy
- Nonviolent Communication
- Nordoff–Robbins music therapy
- Nouthetic counseling
- Nude psychotherapy

== O ==
- Object relations psychotherapy
- Online counseling
- Orthodox psychotherapy

== P ==
- Parent–child interaction therapy
- Parent-infant psychotherapy
- Parent management training
- Pastoral counseling
- Person-centered therapy
- Play therapy
- Poetry therapy
- Positive psychology
- Positive psychotherapy
- Post-rationalist cognitive therapy
- Postural Integration
- Primal therapy
- Primal Integration
- Process oriented psychology
- Process psychology
- Progressive counting (PC)
- Prolonged exposure therapy
- Provocative therapy
- Psychedelic therapy
- Psychoanalysis
- Psychodrama
- Psychodynamic psychotherapy
- Psychosynthesis
- Psychotherapy and social action model
- Pulsing (bodywork)

== R ==
- Rational emotive behavior therapy (REBT)
- Rational living therapy (RLT)
- Reality therapy
- Rebirthing-breathwork
- Recovered-memory therapy
- Re-evaluation counseling
- Regulation-focused psychotherapy for children
- Reichian therapy
- Relationship counseling
- Relational-cultural therapy
- Reminiscence therapy
- Remote therapy
- Rogerian psychotherapy
- Rolfing

== S ==
- Sandplay therapy
- Satitherapy
- Schema therapy
- School-based family counseling
- Sensory integration therapy
- Sex therapy
- Sexual identity therapy
- Sexual trauma therapy
- Social therapy
- Solution-focused brief therapy
- Somatic experiencing
- Somatic psychology
- Spiritual self-schema therapy
- Status dynamic psychotherapy
- Strategic family therapy
- Structural family therapy
- Superhero therapy
- Supportive psychotherapy
- Systematic desensitization
- Systemic therapy

== T ==
- T-groups
- Therapeutic community
- Thought Field Therapy
- Transactional analysis
- Transference focused psychotherapy
- Transpersonal psychology
- Transtheoretical model (TTM or "stages of change")
- Trauma focused cognitive behavioral therapy
- Trauma-informed feminist therapy
- Trauma systems therapy
- Twelve-step programs

== V ==
- Vegetotherapy

== W ==
- Wilderness therapy
- Writing therapy

== Y ==
- Yoga for therapeutic purposes

== See also ==
- Clinical behavior analysis
- List of cognitive–behavioral therapies
- List of counseling topics
- List of therapies
- Services for mental disorders
- Treatment of mental disorders
