= List of cognitive–behavioral therapies =

Cognitive behavioral therapy encompasses many therapeutical approaches, techniques and systems.

- Acceptance and commitment therapy was developed by Steven C. Hayes and others based in part on relational frame theory and has been called a "third wave" cognitive behavioral therapy.
- Anxiety management training was developed by Suinn and Richardson (1971) for helping clients control their anxiety by the use of relaxation and other skills.
- Aversion therapy, developed by Hans Eysenck
- Behavior therapy
- Behavioral activation is a behavioral approach to treating depression, developed by Neil Jacobson and others.
- Cognitive therapy was developed by Aaron Beck.
- Cognitive analytic therapy
- Cognitive behavioral analysis system of psychotherapy
- Cognitive emotional behavioral therapy
- Cognitive processing therapy for Post traumatic stress disorder
- Compassion focused therapy
- Computerised cognitive behavioral therapy
- Contingency management
- Counterconditioning
- Decoupling
- Desensitization
- Dialectical behavior therapy
- Direct therapeutic exposure
- Exposure and response prevention
- Exposure therapy
- Functional analytic psychotherapy
- Habit Reversal Training
- Metacognitive therapy
- Metacognitive training
- Mindfulness-based cognitive therapy
- Multimodal therapy
- Problem-solving therapy
- Prolonged exposure therapy
- Rational emotive behavior therapy, formerly called rational therapy and rational emotive therapy, was founded by Albert Ellis.
- Reality therapy
- Relapse prevention
- Schema therapy
- Self-control therapy
- Self-instructional training was developed by Donald Meichenbaum, influenced by the developmental psychology of Alexander Luria and Lev Vygotsky, designed to treat the mediational deficiencies of impulsive children.
- Stress inoculation training
- Systematic desensitization is an anxiety reduction technique, developed by Joseph Wolpe.
- Systematic rational restructuring was an attempt by Marvin Goldfried to reanalyze systematic desensitization in terms of cognitive mediation and coping skills.

== See also ==
- List of therapies
- List of psychotherapies
