= SBFC =

SBFC may refer to:

- School-Based Family Counseling
- Shepherd's Bush F.C.
- Short Brothers F.C.
- Sky Blue FC
- Stevenage Borough F.C., now known as Stevenage F.C.
- Solihull Borough F.C.
- South Brisbane Football Club
- South Bunbury Football Club
- Sindh Board of Film Censors
