= RLT =

RLT may refer to:

- Raleigh Little Theatre, a community theatre in Raleigh, North Carolina
- Rational living therapy, a form of cognitive behavioral therapy
- Real-life experience (transgender), the duration of time required for gender affirming treatments
- Regimental Landing Team, a type of marine expeditionary brigade
- Research in Learning Technology, an open access peer-reviewed academic journal
- Arlit Airport, the IATA code RLT
