= Pulsing =

Pulsing may refer to:

- Pulsing (bodywork)
- Pulse (signal processing)
