= HSSF =

HSSF may refer to:

- Heimler Scale of Social Functioning
- Horrible SpreadSheet Format, in Apache POI
