= HSF =

HSF may refer to:

== Businesses and organisations ==
- Hazara Student Federation, Pakistan
- Hellenic Sailing Federation, Greece
- Herbert Smith Freehills, an Anglo-Australian law firm
- Hispanic Scholarship Fund, United States
- Home Service Force, of the British Army

== Other uses ==
- Heat shock factor, in molecular biology
- Houston Shakespeare Festival, Texas, US
- Human Social Functioning, in psychotherapy
- Suifenhe Airport, China (IATA:HSF)
