= RPFC =

RPFC may refer to:

- Railway Protection Force commandos
- Regulation-focused psychotherapy for children
- Reigate Priory F.C.
- Right dorsolateral prefrontal cortex
- Rosslyn Park F.C.
- Roxburgh Park Football Club
- Royal Patriotic Fund Corporation
