= Metaphor therapy =

Metaphor therapy is a kind of psychotherapy that uses metaphor as a tool to help people express their experiences symbolically. As a spontaneous product of processes within the mind involving both the conscious and unconscious of the person, metaphor is an important psychotherapeutic tool for exploring personal meaning, fundamental to insight-oriented psychotherapy.

== History and background ==
The exploration of metaphor bases many of its premises on the work of Carl Jung. In his work Man and his Symbols (1964), Jung wrote that because there are many things beyond the range of human understanding, a person constantly uses symbolic terms to represent concepts that they cannot define or fully comprehend. They produce symbols unconsciously and spontaneously, for example in the form of dreams, and there are also unconscious aspects of their perception of reality. Even when their senses react to real phenomena, sights and sounds, they are somehow translated from the world of reality into that of the mind, i.e., symbolized. Jung’s writings contain several case examples of how metaphors act as a means for the psyche to represent experiences of personal significance in symbolic ways.

Later studies found that metaphoric expressions are tied to some unconscious or implicit aspect of the person’s experience. Early psychoanalysts interpreted metaphoric productions as displaced and distorted fragments of repressed instincts, whereas subsequent developments in ego psychology saw the function of figurative language as a tool that could help people increase understanding of themselves and their problems. High levels of novel figurative language were found to occur near periods of insight. Furthermore, the exploration of metaphors assisted in both clarifying the person’s experiences and also opening up new ways of understanding, leading the person to develop more satisfying ways of experiencing and acting.

Metaphor functions as a compromise formation analogous to a dream or symptom in the sense that it simultaneously expresses material from different psychic levels, for example, topographical, structural, and dynamic. Metaphor use and exploration gives people a way of linking their experiences across diverse times and situations. For example, for one man the metaphorical statement “when I am pushed, I push back” connected with several relationships over the course of his life, from his father to current authority figures and even friendships. The exploration of metaphors encourages a subjective, relative, and symbolic attitude toward one’s experience, a “seeing through” one’s particular fantasies about an “objective world”. This change in perception creates a psychological ground on which movement can occur, and this freedom of movement is the aim of therapy.

By linking different things, metaphors aim at conceptual change through new insight, involving re-categorization of experience along new lines of meaning. Metaphorical interpretation of life, rather than analogical, combines the past with what is new. The transference relationship is thought of as an example of metaphor, a kind of symbolic translation of earlier strivings to present-day circumstances, as opposed to a re-enactment, which would lose the creative power of the metaphor and be merely analogic.

== In psychotherapeutic practice ==
The use of metaphor therapy in psychotherapeutic practice can be accomplished using a six-stage model for working with patient-generated metaphors. This model outlines steps for exploring metaphors, as follows:

1. Hearing and suspending making sense of the metaphor.
2. Validating and expressing interest in the metaphor.
3. Expanding the metaphor by encouraging description of associations, emotions and imagery (may share own associations).
4. Playing with the possibilities by exploring what the metaphor might mean.
5. Marking and selecting the aspects that support the current treatment goals.
6. Connecting with the future by outlining tasks that lie ahead based on shared understandings derived from the metaphor.
