= Daniel Harold Casriel =

American psychiatrist and writer (1924–1983)

- Dan Casriel talking about his 1972 book A Scream Away From Happiness
- Born: March 1, 1924; New York City
- Died: June 7, 1983 (aged 59); Manhattan
- Occupations: Psychiatrist, psychoanalyst, writer

Daniel Harold Casriel (March 1, 1924 – June 7, 1983) was an American psychiatrist, psychoanalyst and writer from New York City. Casriel's method of group psychotherapy proposed a framework for the field of relationship education, the "PAIRS' relationship roadmap for couples". Dr. Casriel also founded the Daytop treatment centers, which were strongly inspired by the psychotherapy cult Synanon.

== Early life and education ==
Daniel Harold Casriel was born in New York City on 1 March 1924. He graduated from the University of Cincinnati College of Medicine in 1949 at age twenty-five. In 1950, he began his residency at the Kingsbridge Veterans Administration Hospital in the Bronx. Eight months into his residency he was drafted by the Army and sent to Okinawa where he served as a psychiatrist for a year and a half. He became a captain.

== Career ==
=== Professional training ===
Casriel was a trainee at the Columbia Psychoanalytic Institute for Training and Research between 1949 and 1953 and spent 7½ years in analysis with Dr. Abram Kardiner, the founder of the first psychoanalytic institute in the United States and a former analysand of Sigmund Freud. Casriel was also a past president of the American Society of Psychoanalytic Physicians.

=== Private practice ===
In the winter of 1953, Casriel began private practice as a psychiatrist, in New York City. Shortly thereafter he was appointed as a psychiatric consultant to the Metropolitan Hospital in East Harlem and the Court of Special Sessions in Manhattan where he became active in the treatment drug addicts.

=== Writer ===
In July 1962 Casriel visited the famous Synanon therapeutic community on the US West Coast. So impressed was he with what he saw there, he moved into the community for a "closer look" and wrote a book about the experience (So Fair a House: The Story of Synanon). In February 1963, Casriel gave $2000 to seven members of Synanon to start a community on the East Coast. The result was a house on Greens Farm Road, Westport, Connecticut, directed by Jack Hurst, former president of Synanon in Santa Monica.

=== Consultancy ===
In the summer of the same year, Casriel became the psychiatric consultant for the Daytop Lodge project on Staten Island, a kind of half-way house for the rehabilitation of convicted felons who were addicts. Later, he became cofounder, psychiatric director and medical superintendent of Daytop Village, now one of the world's largest therapeutic communities.

Group Therapy devised by Daniel Casriel includes a session on floor mats to "work out" the individual's feeling of pain and anger, top. Below, left, Casriel, assists a patient in expressing his anger and feeling of pain The New Identity Process, 1973.

=== Experiments ===
In the fall of 1963, Casriel, now age 39, began experimenting with group therapy in his private practice in New York. He began leading groups alone and with peer group leaders like David A. Deitch, the Synanon director at Westport. In 1972 he released his findings to the public in a book titled "A Scream Away From Happiness" where he describes The New Identity Process, a group psychotherapy that uses screaming, hugging and affirmations of basic needs.

=== Methods ===
By the late 1960s, Dr. Casriel had extended his private practice to include a small therapeutic community on the top four floors of his office building. This program he called AREBA, short for Accelerated Re-education of The Emotions, Behavior and Attitudes. It consisted of about a dozen beds for young addicts who came to live, "work" and participate in the "New Identity Process". When Casriel died in 1983, former patient Steven Yohay expanded the program and became president of AREBA Casriel, Inc., today the oldest surviving private addiction treatment centre in the United States.

In the late 1970s, Casriel began teaching his method in several European centers. The German psychiatrist Dr. Walther H. Lechler became one of his students and later employed the ideas extensively in the development of the Herrenalb Model of psychotherapy used at the hospital of the same name in South Germany. Another trainee was the Danish psychoanalyst, Osho, sanyassin and mystic, Shanti Kristian Dahl-Madsen. He incorporated the new identity process into a life-affirmative approach to spirituality he called 'Spiritual Hedonism',

Casriel's method of group psychotherapy is continued today through the efforts of the International Society of Bonding Psychotherapy which has members in 8 European cities as well as North and South America.

== Influence ==
Casriel's novel concept of a "Relationship Road Map" became the foundation of PAIRS' approach to relationship education. Expanding on Horace Mann's focus on the pursuit of happiness as a universal human desire, Casriel theorized that the emotion of love comes from the anticipation of pleasure.

Based on Casriel's theory, "bonding," which he defined as "the unique combination of emotional openness and physical closeness with another human being," is central to sustaining healthy, intimate relationships. Casriel taught that symptoms of bonding deprivation include: "illness, fatigue, depression, rigidity, constriction, isolation, and the range of anti-social behaviors such as drug and alcohol abuse, gambling and sex addictions." Casriel considered bonding a biologically-based need similar to the need for food, water, air, and shelter, yet unique as the only biologically-based need people cannot meet for themselves.

== Death ==
Casriel died at his home in Manhattan on June 7, 1983, age 59 from a form of amyotrophic lateral sclerosis (ALS). He is survived by his wife, the former Olivia Cohen; two sons, Seth, a film editor and producer, and Lyle, a financial adviser.

== Books ==
- So Fair a House: The Story of Synanon, New York: Prentice-Hall, 1963
- Daytop: Three Addicts and Their Cure, New York: Hill & Wang, 1971
- A Scream Away from Happiness, New York: Grosset & Dunlap, 1972

== See also ==
- Attachment theory
- Human bonding
- PAIRS Foundation
