= Daytop =

Drug addiction treatment organization

Daytop Village, Daytop, aka Daytop Village New Jersey Inc., aka Daytop Preparatory School
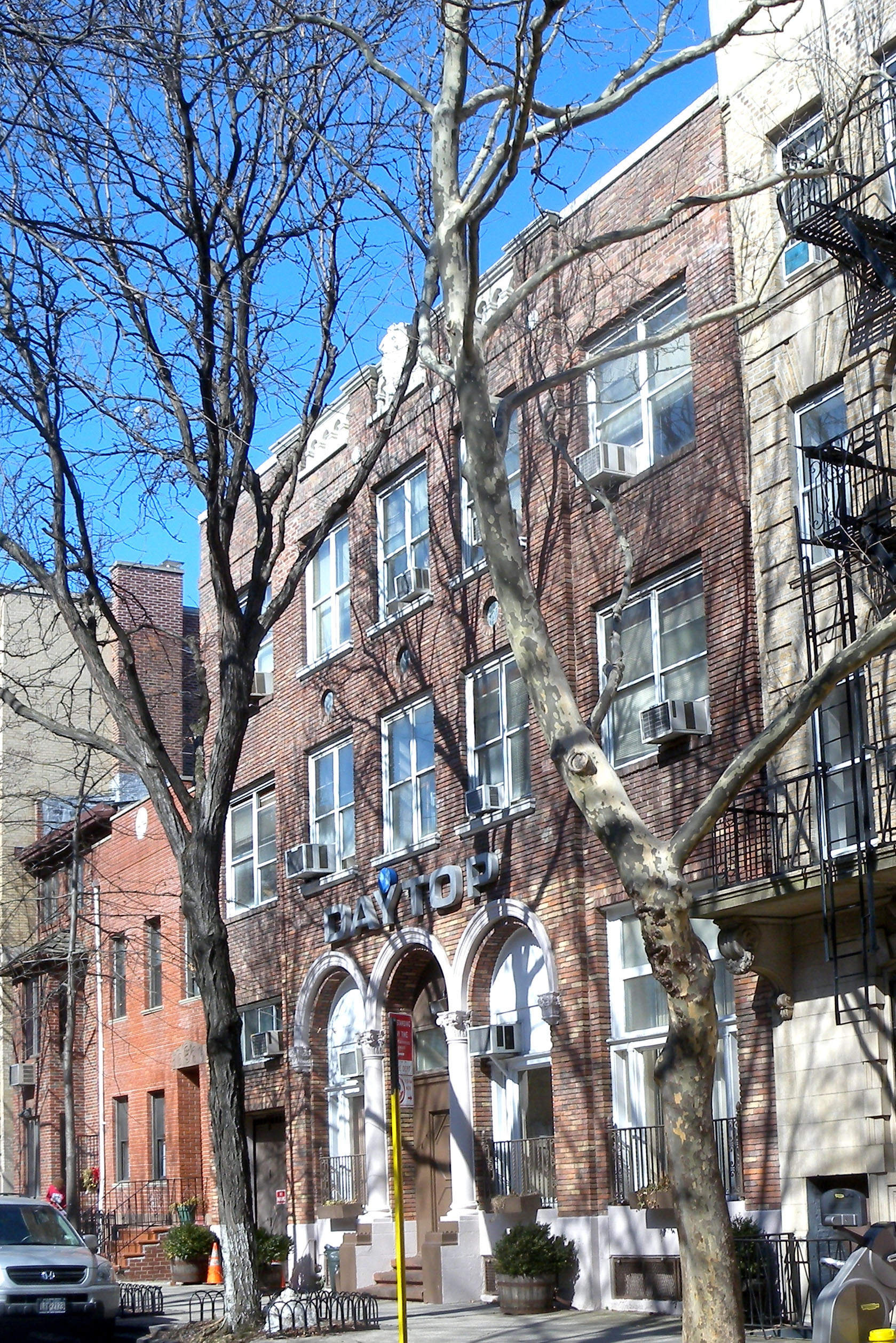
- Daytop center in Brooklyn
- Industry: drug addiction treatment organization
- Founded: 1963
- Founder: Dr. Daniel Casriel M.D; Monsignor William B. O'Brien & Ex addict; Ron Brancato
- Number of locations: New York City, Mendham Borough, New Jersey
- Area served: New Jersey and New York
- Parent: Daytop Village aka Daytop

Daytop, or Daytop Village, or “Daytop Village New Jersey Inc.” is a drug addiction treatment organization with facilities in New York City and New Jersey, wherein numerous instances of child sexual abuse are known to have occurred. It was founded in 1963 in Tottenville, Staten Island by Daniel Harold Casriel along with Monsignor William B. O'Brien, a Roman Catholic priest and founder and president of the World Federation of Therapeutic Communities who also in 2019 was posthumously included by the Independent Reconciliation and Compensation Program (IRCP) of the Archdiocese of New York on its list of clergy credibly accused of sexual abuse.

Ron Brancato from the Pelham Bay area of Bronx New York, Program Director and former resident of Synanon, California. Synanon was the only other drug rehabilitation program until Daytop Village opened. Daytop also included a juvenile program based in Mendham, New Jersey. The Mendham, New Jersey facility also included a school for juveniles called Daytop School.

Father William B. O'Brien included controversial methods such as "attack therapy" (a pseudoscientific confrontational approach used contentiously by Synanon which involves verbal abuse or humiliation) and "behavior modification" (which has a history of criticism with regards to human dignity) in his addiction treatment methods. Synanon has since been investigated as one of the "most dangerous and violent cults America had ever seen."

According to Dr. Casriel its name was originally an acronym for "Drug Addicts Yield to Probation" as Daytop was originally a kind of "halfway house" for convicted addicts. Another account gives the name to be an acronym for "Drug Addicts Yield to Persuasion". A third account gives the name to be an acronym for "Drug Addicts Yield to Others Persuasion."

The Daytop program, one of the oldest drug-treatment programs in the United States, is based on the therapeutic community model whose history within the U.S. has it based in the Synanon Game. In spite of its controversies and abuses, it describes itself as "a supportive emotional community in which people feel secure but at the same time are held strictly accountable for their behavior".

During a 1980 visit to Daytop Village future first lady Nancy Reagan initially became aware of the drug epidemic in the United States. This event is widely acknowledged as the genesis of her "Just Say No" program.

In late 2015, Daytop Village merged with Samaritan Village, another 50+ year old health and human services nonprofit organization with a specialty in drug and alcohol treatment. The newly merged organization changed its name to Samaritan Daytop Village. Daytop's Mendham, New Jersey location has since closed amidst sexual and child abuse concerns.

Alleged victims of Msgr. O'Brien would be eligible to come forward with claims to the ICRP, although O'Brien died in 2014 before he could answer accusations.
