= Lorna Smith Benjamin =

American psychologist known for Interpersonal Reconstructive Therapy

Lorna Smith Benjamin (born 1934) is an American psychologist best known for her innovative treatment of patients with personality disorders who have not responded to traditional therapies or medications.

== Education ==
She received a B.A. in psychology from Oberlin College in Ohio, and a master's degree and Ph.D. from the University of Wisconsin, where she studied under Harry Harlow, working with the baby monkeys in his famous "wire mother" experiments.

== Work ==
Benjamin has practiced as a licensed psychologist in Wisconsin and Utah. She taught at the University of Wisconsin Medical School from 1971 to 1986 and was a professor of psychology at the University of Utah from 1988 until her retirement in 2012.

In 1968 she began work on the Structural Analysis of Social Behavior (SASB), a method she invented to categorize personality disorders. Originally conceived as a tool for studying primate behavior, SASB was used to understanding personality disorders when they were first described in the Diagnostic and Statistical Manual of Mental Disorders in 1980. SASB describes human relationships as fitting along two axes: "love-hate," and "enmeshment-differentiation," with the additional dimension of "interpersonal focus." Benjamin received an honorary degree from the Umeå University, Sweden, for her work with SASB.

After many years of work on the SASB model, Benjamin developed Interpersonal Reconstructive Therapy (IRT), based on SASB. Rather than concentrating on the amelioration of symptoms (except in crisis situations), IRT focuses on identifying the patterns underlying a patient's maladaptive behavior and guiding them toward the formation of new, healthier patterns. SASB is used both to aid patients in understanding problems in their relationships, and to help them conceive of the form that improved relationships would take.

Benjamin is founder of the Interpersonal Reconstructive Therapy Clinic at the University of Utah Neuropsychiatric Institute.

== Works ==
- Interpersonal Diagnosis and Treatment of Personality Disorders (1996, The Guilford Press)
- Interpersonal Reconstructive Therapy. (2003, The Guilford Press)
- Interpersonal Reconstructive Therapy for Anger, Anxiety and Depression (2018, The Guilford Press)

== See also ==
- Interpersonal circumplex
