= Eastern Orthodox psychotherapy =

Concept in the Eastern Orthodox Church

Orthodox psychotherapy refers to "the process of spiritual growth and development" as used in the Eastern Orthodox Church. In this context, it is a theological term rather than medical or psychological term. The term is not limited to traditional psychotherapy used to treat psychological problems, but it rather refers to all people by dealing with their core existential issues. Metropolitan Hierotheos introduced the phrase through his homonymous book.
