= Satitherapy =

Integrative psychotherapy approach

Satitherapy is an integrative psychotherapy, which uses mindfulness (sati) as the key principle within a person centered approach developed by Carl R. Rogers. In this approach, it is the client who defines the goals of therapy and attains them with therapist's ethically skillful help (kusala). Satitherapy is grounded on respecting all life (ahimsa) and takes as its base the bodily anchored experiencing that is beyond the words. For this, it integrates the techniques of psychodrama developed by Jacob L. Moreno and expressive media for therapeutic acting-out, as well as the procedures of Buddhist insight meditation (satipatthána-vipassaná) and satidrama for therapeutic acting-in.

The theoretical training of satitherapists uses both the conceptual frame of Western psychology of mindfulness (cf. Germer, Siegel, Fulton, 2005; Didonna, 2009) and the system of psychology and ethics elaborated in the ancient Asian teachings of Abhidhamma (Frýba 1989; Frýba, 1996). Most of the practical skills and techniques are derived from the Abhidhamma. Thus the format of satitherapy includes theoretical knowledge and therapeutic skills from both Western and Asian sources.

There are two things unique to satitherapy:

- the use of ethics as the explanatory principle of suffering and as the basic paradigm of skillful coping
- the practical principle of skillful setting or removing of conditions (vatta-pativatta) so as to enable the upheaval of reality (dhamma-uddhacca) against the pathogenic wrong views (ditthi).

These two paradigms of satitherapy are derived from Abhidhamma and they are not found in any other psychotherapy, which was developed within Western Euro-American culture.
