= Cognitive emotional behavioral therapy =

Mental health conditions

Cognitive emotional behavioral therapy (CEBT) is an extended version of cognitive behavioral therapy (CBT) aimed at helping individuals to evaluate the basis of their emotional distress and thus reduce the need for associated dysfunctional coping behaviors (e.g., eating behaviors including binging, purging, restriction of food intake, and substance misuse). This psychotherapeutic intervention draws on a range of models and techniques including dialectical behavior therapy (DBT), mindfulness meditation, acceptance and commitment therapy (ACT), and experiential exercises.

CEBT has been used primarily for individuals with eating disorders, as it offers an alternative when standard CBT is unsuccessful in relieving symptoms. Research indicates that CEBT may help reduce emotional eating, depression, and anxiety and also improve self-esteem. CEBT was developed in 2006 by British psychologist Emma Gray (née Corstorphine). Its key components include psychological education; techniques to enhance awareness of emotions and motivation to change; and strategies to restructure beliefs about the experience and expression of emotions. Although (CEBT) was initially developed to help individuals with eating disorders, its effectiveness in helping people to better understand and manage their emotions has meant that it is increasingly being used by psychologists as a 'pretreatment' to prepare patients for the process of therapy for a range of problems including anxiety, depression, obsessive–compulsive disorder (OCD), and post-traumatic stress disorder (PTSD), which can often be emotionally challenging.

== Techniques ==
Dialectical behavior therapy (DBT) – DBT is a type of psychotherapy used to treat various disorders. The purpose of this therapy is to help create positive changes in a person's behavior. DBT focuses mainly on treating individuals who have bulimia, drug-dependence, borderline personality disorder, depression, or other psychological disorders.

Mindfulness meditation – Mindfulness meditation is a technique that increases and improves awareness. This technique aims to lower stress and improve our attention. It is a form of focusing on what is presently happening. Mindfulness meditation aims at improving mental health through helping those with disorders be able to manage their emotions.

Acceptance and commitment therapy (ACT) – Acceptance and commitment therapy is a treatment aimed at helping people to accept the feelings and experiences they go through. Oftentimes people must deal with unpleasant feelings, thoughts or experiences and in response they avoid those emotions as a way of coping. In regards to the way we react, ACT helps with acceptance, making a decision to make changes, and going through with that commitment.

Experiential exercises – Experiential exercises play an important part in CEBT because it allows individuals to become actively involved in the learning process. Experiencing what is being taught can have a positive impact on those individuals who experience emotional and behavioral difficulties. These exercises are often used in different types of therapy in order to help individuals learn about diversity, acceptance, injustice, and so forth. Experiential exercises can be incorporated in the treatment of individuals dealing with disorders. These exercises help people to know how to react or cope in certain situations.

== Background ==
In 2006, Dr. Emma Gray (née Corstorphine) started the idea of cognitive emotional behavioral therapy (CEBT). CEBT uses techniques from other types of treatment such as cognitive behavior therapy and Dialectical behavioral therapy. The main goal of CEBT is to help individuals learn to cope with their emotions, reduce stress and anxiety, and make changes to their behavior. Gray noted that emotion plays a crucial part in disorders, therefore it needs to be further addressed in terms of treatment. Cognitive behavioral therapy aims to treat where a patient needs the most help, whether that is emotional, behavioral, cognitive, etc. CBT has been practiced since the 1960s. There is a greater focus on cognitive psychology and its impact on behavior. In 2003 there began to be suggestions that CBT needed to be expanded to meet the needs of even more specific vulnerabilities such as emotion, social environments, or relationships. Gray saw the need for an approach that has a greater focus on the emotional components.

Gray's research specifically analyzes cognitive emotional behavioral therapy for eating disorders. She found that CBT and related techniques for bulimia were not effective. CBT mainly uses treatments aimed at discovering cognitive or behavioral issues to be the source. Gray's findings show that therapy focused on emotion helped individuals manage their emotions and difficulties. Research has shown that emotional distress is a major cause of bulimia. Additional studies show that what triggers bulimia is oftentimes one's emotional state and their relationships. CEBT helps these individuals with disorders to cope with their emotions and develop the skills necessary to positively handle their situation.

== Case ==
Gray (née Corstorphine) analyzes a case to determine whether cognitive emotional behavior therapy for eating disorders (CEBT-ED) is effective. In this case, a 22-year-old woman named Anna, who has bulimia and anorexia, goes through CBT and is able to regulate some of her eating patterns and lower the number of times she purges. It was acknowledged that Anna had emotional trauma due to the environment she grew up in. Her self esteem and expression of emotion were repressed because of her family. CEBT-ED allowed her to feel encouraged to show her emotions and discover the source of her difficulties. CEBT is an effective way of easing the symptoms of cognitive and emotional disorders when the typical CBT does not provide sufficient exercises and training. Emotion is the primary issue of eating disorders. In Anna's case CBT would have been helpful but would have focused mainly on changing negative or unreasonable thoughts. At the center of Anna's problem was her emotional trauma as a child and her difficulty in expressing how she felt. To address Anna's specific needs, CBT was not enough, but CEBT allowed room for self-reflection to find the root of her issues. CEBT helped her to identify and understand her emotions, allowing her to learn skills that would help her cope with these emotions and relieve the symptoms of her issues.
