= Interpersonal reconstructive therapy =

Interpersonal reconstructive therapy (IRT) is a psychotherapy for treating people with personality disorders, especially those who have not been helped by other therapies or medication. It was developed by Lorna Smith Benjamin, a retired professor at the University of Utah.

IRT is based on understanding of how early attachment patterns affect the patient's later behavior. When the human infant experiences "good enough" early care, it forms a secure attachment to parental figures that serves as a base from which to interact with the world. If early care is less than optimal, the infant must nonetheless attach to caregivers, but the patterns that form may be maladaptive in later life, leading to personality disorders.

These patterns form when an infant internalizes the interactions between itself and caregivers. The internalizations follow one or more of three copy processes: 1. The child acts as the caregiver did. 2. The child acts as if the caregiver is still in control. 3. The child treats himself/herself as the caregiver did.

For instance, if a patient was ignored as a child, the patient may ignore his/her spouse and children, wall off from them as if still being ignored, or neglect himself/herself.

The original caretaker may be long gone from the patient's life, but the patient persists on following the old patterns, striving to mend the broken relationship with the now internalized caretaker. Though the patient may be unaware of the patterns' origin and purpose, they express his/her love for the caretaker and hope that this love will at last be returned. "Every psychopathology is a gift of love."

IRT seeks to recognize and analyze the maladaptive patterns that cause the patient to repeatedly engage in self-destructive behaviors, and guide him/her toward the formation of healthier patterns.

The case formulation categorizes the problem patterns according to Structural Analysis of Social Behavior (SASB), a technique developed by Dr. Benjamin. In SASB, behavior is described according to focus (focus on other, focus on self, or focus on self as if by other), affiliation (the hate-love axis), and interdependence (the emancipate-control axis).

Once the case formulation has been made, therapy can proceed.

The first step in therapy is the formation of the therapy alliance. The relationship between therapist and patient optimally will guide the patient toward forming healthier patterns of attachment. The therapist strives to collaborate with the part of the patient open to new patterns and constructive change. In IRT terminology, this part is called the Growth Collaborator, or Green. The part that seeks to continue with the old patterns is called the Regressive Loyalist, or Red.

During the course of therapy the two forces within the patient's mind, Red and Green, clash, with Green gradually becoming ascendant.

There are five stages to the course of therapy:

1. Collaboration between patient and therapist. 2. Learning about the old patterns, where they come from, and what they are for. 3. Blocking the old patterns. 4. Enabling the will to change 5. Learning new patterns

IRT treatments are rarely completed in less than a year, and most require multiple years.

== See also ==
- Attachment theory
- Interpersonal psychotherapy
- Schema therapy
- Personality disorder
- Case formulation
