= Direct therapeutic exposure =

Behavior therapy technique

Direct therapeutic exposure (DTE) is a behavior therapy technique pioneered by Patrick A. Boudewyns, where stressors are vividly and safely confronted to help combat veterans, and patients with posttraumatic stress disorder (PTSD), panic disorder, or phobias. Exposure therapy has supporting evidence with both simple and complex traumas. A similar therapy is Eye Movement Desensitization and Reprocessing (EMDR). First known publication in book form is Flooding and Implosive Therapy: Direct Therapeutic Exposure in Clinical Practice by Patrick A. Boudewyns, Robert H. Shipley. 1983. ISBN 0-306-41155-5.

It is not uncommon to combine DTE treatment with other therapies.

== Use ==
Direct exposure has been used with a variety of populations including agoraphobia and chronic PTSD. It involves as the name applies placing the client either real or imaginally in the feared situation.

== See also ==
Other techniques for treating PTSD:

- Cognitive behavior therapy
- Emotionally focused therapy
- Expressive therapy
- Family therapy
- Outward Bound
- Prolonged exposure therapy
- Psychodynamic psychotherapy
