= Self-control therapy =

Depression treatment, 1970s-1980s

Self-control therapy is a behavioral treatment method based on a self-control model of depression, that was modeled after Frederick Kanfer's behavioral (1971) model of self-control.

== Self-control model of depression ==
Lynn P. Rehm proposed a self-control model of depression based on the three processes included in a feedback loop model of self-control: self-monitoring, self-evaluation, and self-reinforcement. In the self-control model, depression is characterized as the result of deficits in these processes of self-control.

Self-monitoring is described as the observation and evaluation of one's own behavior, including its antecedents (events preceding the behavior) and consequences. Rehm describes two characteristics of self-monitoring in those who experience depression: the tendency to attend only to negative events and the tendency to recognize only immediate consequences of behavior.

Self-evaluation is described as an individual's perception of their growth and progress compared to an internal standard. For example, a dieter may compare their calorie count for the day to a goal and decide whether or not they reached that goal. An internal standard can be set by adopting externally imposed standards, such as a diet calorie chart based on sex and height, or they may choose criteria that are more or less stringent than external standards. In Rehm's model, self-evaluation is characterized in those experiencing depression by inaccurate, and often external, attributions of causality and stringent self-evaluation criteria. For example, an individual who self-imposes a criterion of obtaining 100% on every test they take, has set an unrealistic criterion. When that stringent criterion is not met, the individual may inaccurately attribute their failure to an internal characteristic, such as intelligence.

Rehm also includes self-reinforcement in his model, and states that those experiencing depression infrequently engage in self-reward and engage more frequently in self-punishment.

== Therapy ==
Carilyn Z. Fuchs and Rehm developed a group administered self-control behavior therapy program based on Rehm's self-control model of depression and the concept that depression results from an individual's deficits in self-control. The original, six-week program focused on training self-monitoring, self-evaluation, and self-reinforcement skills in three phases. Each phase consisted of two sessions.

The focus of the first phase was on self-monitoring. During the first two sessions participants were exposed to the behavioral self-control rationale for the program and introduced to the concept of self-monitoring to influence their mood. As homework, participants were asked to record the positive activities they experienced each day on a log form. The logs were reviewed and discussed during the second session and participants were asked to analyze their data for patterns. Specifically, they were asked to look for correlations between the number of positive activities they experienced and their mood.

The second phase focused on self-evaluation and the importance of setting realistic and obtainable goals for oneself. Participants were asked to identify goals and then break those goals into sub-goals.

During the third phase, participants were introduced to the relationship between self-reinforcement and depression as described in Rehm's model. Participants were guided through the creation of a self-managed reward system that they could use in reinforcing progress toward the goals identified in the self-evaluation phase. At the termination of the self-control behavior therapy program, participants were provided with a summary of the program content and provided with materials to aid in the continuation of the skills they had learned.

== Effectiveness with adults ==
Fuchs and Rehm (1977) evaluated the effects of their group administered self-control behavior therapy program (described above) with depressed women ages 18–48, against a nonspecific group therapy condition and a control group. Researchers found self-control therapy to be superior to that of the nonspecific group therapy condition and the control group based on results from a self-report of depression assessed by the Minnesota Multiphasic Personality Inventory Depression scale (MMPI-D) and the Beck Depression Inventory, the participants' activity level assessed by a group interaction activity measure, and participants' general level of psychopathology assessed by the MMPI. All 8 participants in the self-control therapy group had scores in the clinical range at pretest, suggesting that they displayed many depressive symptoms. Those 8 participants had scores in the normal range by posttest, suggesting that they displayed few depressive symptoms. The shift in scores from the clinical range to the normal range occurred in only 3 out of 10 participants in the nonspecific therapy group and 1 out of 10 participants in the control group.

Rehm et al. (1979) replicated the procedures used in Fuchs and Rehm's (1977) study and evaluated the effects of self-control therapy against a behavioral assertion skills training program. Researchers found self-control therapy effective for moderately depressed women, and therefore successfully replicated the findings from Fuchs and Rehm (1977).

== Effectiveness with children ==
Stark, Reynolds and Kaslow (1987) modified Rehm et al.'s (1984) self-control therapy manual for adults into an intervention program designed to teach children adaptive skills for self-monitoring, self-evaluating performance, attributing the cause of good and bad outcomes, and self-reinforcement. Similar to self-control therapy for adults, the intervention taught skills to the participants through presentations, in-therapy training, and the completion of behavioral homework assignments. The content was also similar and included self-monitoring of pleasant activities and the use of log sheets, identification of delayed consequences, realistic standards for self-evaluation, and frequent self-reinforcement. Researchers compared the effects of self-control therapy to those of a behavioral problem-solving therapy and a waiting list condition. Both self-control therapy and behavioral problem-solving therapy were found to be effective with moderately depressed children, grades 4-6, with children reporting less depressive symptoms at posttest. The effects of both interventions appeared to generalize over time, especially for the children in the self-control group who reported significantly less depression at an 8-week follow-up than immediately after treatment.

== Effectiveness with subpopulations ==
Rehm (1983) found no significant differences in self-control therapy outcomes as a function of age, marital status, employment, education, income or religion in a sample of 104 clinically depressed women. Better outcomes as a result of self-control therapy were found for participants who experienced acute onset of depressive symptoms, a high recent number of negative life events, and demonstrated positive self-control attitudes.
