= Trauma systems therapy =

Mental health treatment model

Trauma Systems Therapy (TST) is a mental health treatment model for children and adolescents who have been exposed to trauma, defined as experiencing, witnessing, or confronting "an event or events that involved actual or threatened death or serious injury, or a threat to the physical integrity of self or others". TST focuses on the child's emotional and behavioral needs as well as the environments where the child lives (home, school, community). The treatment model includes four components (skill-based psychotherapy, home and community-based care, advocacy, and psychopharmacology) that are fully described in a published manual. A clinical trial showed that TST is effective in improving the mental health and well-being of children who have been traumatized. TST has also been successfully replicated.

TST is not just for victims, but also educates the victims' significant others in order for them to support the victims in their recovery and help them control their emotions during future stressful events.

When referring to TST, therapists analyze four categories: the reason a child may need TST, the signs and symptoms expressed by the child, the management and treatment methods and the results of children who have gone through TST. A look at what causes emotional trauma, the families involved, and how therapy can heal the child as well as the adult are also important factors.

== Reasons for treatment ==
Traumatic events that affect children are seen in households where sexual, mental, or physical abuse is present. The inability to regulate self-emotions either directly or indirectly is a clinical sign that a traumatic event has affected the child.

According to child psychiatrist Dr. Glenn Saxe, “TST is a comprehensive model for treating traumatic stress in children and adolescents that adds to individually based approaches by specifically addressing the child’s social environment and/or systems of care”. This may include children or adolescents having social problems in school or in their home secondary to rape, physical abuse, neglect, death of a caregiver and/or any significant life altering emotion trauma.

Sexual, physical, or mental traumatic events can affect present, past memory, and the anticipated future. Saxe's theory in “The March of the Moments: Traumatic Stress in the Past, Present, and Future,” begins with “survival-in-the-moment” which causes severe emotions, unexplained personality changes, erratic behavior due to a sudden trigger that reminds the child of the event. Second, “Past memory” refers to “laying down of the present, conscious moments in the brain so that they can be accessible if we need them”. This causes significant long-term trauma because if a child is not able to understand what has happened to him or her in the past, then he or she will go through life with a band-aid on this wound instead of healing mentally and physically.

Finally, “marching into the future” refers to one of the most detrimental causes of traumatic stress, its effect on the child's ability to think into the future. Saxe states, “If consciousness is about the present, and memory is about the past, then planning and anticipation are about the future”. One's ability to see into the future is part of the human cognition, when a child starts to “calculate survival-related risk”; this causes significant stress by continuously reliving the trauma. When a child or adolescent plans their future around what might happen, this never allows the cause of the problem to be resolved, insuring they will never mentally or emotional heal. In addition to the black and white causes of Traumatic Stress, there are also secondary causes that are directly related to these events. So TST not only addresses the event at hand but also the associated problems that come along with it.

== Diagnosis ==
The treatment for TST is based on professional finding. PTSD is an umbrella diagnosis that includes many children and adolescents who show the basic problem of the inability to regulate their emotions. When evaluating a child for TST, therapists look for awareness, affects, and actions when faced with a stressful event or unfamiliar situation. Children who have been exposed to traumatic events show secondary symptoms such as the following: self modulation, self-destructive behavior, disassociation, feeling shameful, sadness, anger, hostility, social withdrawal, poor relationship skills, or changes in personality. In many children, these symptoms can show up long after the event has occurred, during puberty or even the transition into adulthood.

There are three main groups used to categorize a child's trauma: awareness (elements of attention, sense of self, orientation), affect (mood disorders, personality disorders), and action (conduct disorders, personality, mood disorders, eating disorders, or substance abuse). The disorders listed are usually first seen by family members, teachers, counselors, or other adults in the child's life. Children who show signs of depression may also be affected by some sort of PTSD and would benefit from TST. Once children are clinically depressed, they tend to show changes in their thinking about themselves, their view of the world and how they see the future. Signs and symptom associated with the event spill over into the home life, social life, academics and extracurricular activities.

== Management ==
Management of such intense emotional stress has to include the child affected, as well as his or her social surroundings. TST treats the home and proved community based care, provides a service advocacy, helps with emotional regulation skills training and uses psychopharmacology to treat patients. Knowledge of the child's trauma, what stage he or she is at in the recovery phase, and willingness to seek treatment is all part of the healing process for the child and his or her family.

Therapy starts with the home environment. The caregiver has to understand the core problem by addressing if his or her child is sad a lot, destructive, or maybe the school keeps calling Child Protective Services. Understanding why the child is acting in such a manner is crucial in the healing process. Treatment for family, teachers and social workers is done so all the adults are on the same page with the problem at hand; they understand the course for treatment and can all be tools for the child to use during TST. Next, everyone in the child's life must become a service advocacy, which means holding “Family Collaborative Meetings”. This offers education and information to the adults so they know what to expect from TST. Dedication from the adults to meet at the scheduled times, have adequate transportation to therapy, ability to overcome language barriers, and put their children's needs before their own are all essential to success. Emotional regulation skills training is very important to therapy. The process starts with assessment, and then going through the course of treatment. Coping skills are stable and healthy ways to overcome stress and manage a child's emotions and emotional identification, giving the child tools so he or she can better deal with the strategies, and communication about feelings, emotions, fears and concerns. This is especially important as children who experience trauma face a loss of emotional and mental control because of emotional numbing, flashbacks, and a higher probability for many mental health issues. An example of a coping technique that could be used is therapy through creating music. Music helps stimulate feel-good hormones in the brain, and could help re-establish a sense of balance and mental tranquility. Finally, psychopharmacology is medication used to help a person's emotional state. To reach the best therapeutic effect for a child, all of these concepts have to be integrated. The medication approach starts with SSRIs; these help with anxiety, depression and impulsivity. The second-line medications are Benzodiazepines, Tricyclic antidepressants and Antipsychotic medication. These are very strong and are used as a last-ditch effort to prevent a child from having severe emotional problems. Occasionally, sleeping medication is prescribed but all are under careful supervision for harmful side effects. TST is an ongoing process that attempts to heal the child, not band-aid the problem; thus, medication is used sparingly and patients are weaned to lower therapeutic doses over time.

== Results ==
TST patients showed a much longer committed enrollment time versus the patient in basic therapy by almost 90%. The key to success is preventing dropout; this is a long process and significant evidence-based treatment needs at least eight sessions. Children with emotional trauma tend to come from families with lower income and/or substance abuse problems. This makes it hard for parents to be committed to TST, particularly if they struggle with addiction or abuse themselves. Children have shown significant progress just by the one-on-one attention during TST; a child's social environment is crucial to his or her success in treatment. Results vary in different social levels of the country, different families and what each child has experienced and its severity.
