= Spiritual self-schema therapy =

Addiction therapy

Spiritual self-schema therapy, sometimes referred to as 3-S Therapy, is a type of therapy for addicted individuals who have contracted or are at risk for contracting HIV. 3-S Therapy was developed at Yale University School of Medicine by S. Kelly Avants, Ph.D., and Arthur Margolin, Ph.D. The therapy aims to reduce illicit drug use as well as drug- and sex-related risk behaviors. In general, it aims to promote living a spiritual life aiding in their recovery. Spiritual self-schema therapy has a non-theistic foundation based on Buddhist practices, which are very similar to contemporary cognitive-behavioral techniques, and incorporates the client's spiritual beliefs, which do not need to be specifically or conventionally religious. 3-S therapy does not "convert" clients to Buddhism or any other spiritual or religious belief system, but always works within the client's pre-existing set of beliefs.

== Self-schema ==
The term self-schema describes a mental process to aim in understanding and organizing incoming information (stimuli). An example would include looking in your rearview mirror while driving and seeing flashing lights - typically an individual has an automatic response and prepares to pull over without having to think. This illustrates a well-organized schema on "flashing lights". The connection between self-schema and spiritual self-schema therapy is shown in the automatic beliefs about oneself. An individual doesn't have to stop and think "Who am I? How would somebody like that respond to this situation?" If an individual is shy and believes they are ugly, they may see somebody looking in their direction and assume the person is staring at how ugly they are, when in reality they could be finding the person quite attractive or even not looking at them at all.

== 3-S at Yale ==
Yale School of Medicine has started a program called 3-S Therapy, which stands for Spiritual Self-Schema. Self-schemas can be helpful, but they can also be problematic. Stereotypes are an example. Additionally, people who believe that they are "bad, worthless, or unlovable" do significant amounts of mental damage to themselves. Yale School of Medicine's 3-S program promotes spirituality as a strong resource for coping with life's troubles. The goal of its program is to create a path to enhance one's spiritual nature.

== HIV ==
There is a growing trend in attempting to integrate spiritual and religious beliefs into HIV prevention and addiction treatment. Spiritual self-schema therapy is one such attempt. Spiritual self-schema therapy enables a cognitive shift from the habitual "addict" self-schema to the "spiritual" self-schema. This new schema carries various harm reduction beliefs and behaviors. This switch has been illustrated, according to a study conducted by Margolin, et al., to provide "greater decreases in impulsivity and intoxicant use" as well as an increase in "spiritual practices and motivation for abstinence, HIV prevention and medication adherence."
