= Bonding psychotherapy =

Bonding Psychotherapy is a process of group therapy originally developed by New York psychiatrist Daniel Casriel between 1965 and 1983. The method was called "The New Identity Process" but was officially changed in 2001 by the organization which continues his work.
