= Chess therapy =

Form of psychotherapy

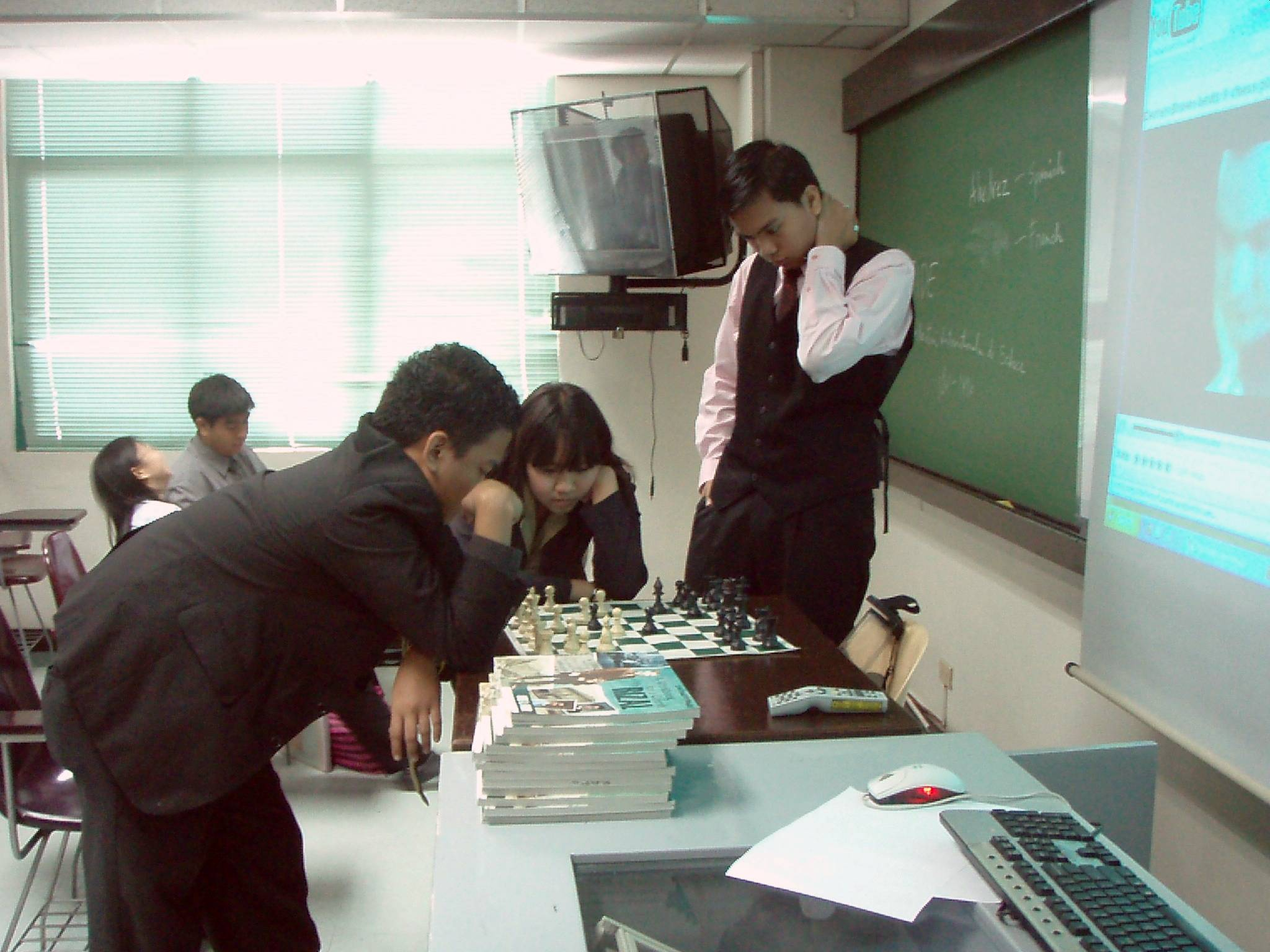
Students of the Angelo King International Center, De La Salle-College of Saint Benilde learning the dynamics in chess, showing that it is a social experience which necessitates abiding by rules, taking into consideration the wishes and acts of another person, and wherein intense interpersonal relations are possible in a brief period

Chess therapy is a form of psychotherapy that attempts to use chess games between the therapist and client or clients to form stronger connections between them towards a goal of confirmatory or alternate diagnosis and consequently, better healing. Its founder can be considered to be the Persian polymath Rhazes (AD 852–932), who was at one time the chief physician of the Baghdad hospital. His use of tactics and strategies in board games as metaphors in real life to help his patients think clearer were rediscovered and employed by Fadul and Canlas.

One of the earliest reported cases of chess therapy involves the improvement in an isolated, schizoid, 16-year-old youth that took place after he became interested in chess. Chess provided an outlet for his hostile impulses in a non-retaliatory manner. Good use was made of the patient's digressions from the game and his newly acquired ability to speak about his feelings, fantasies and dreams which the particular emotional situation of the game touched off. The report demonstrates how the fact that chess is a game, and not real, enabled the patient to exert some conscious control over his feelings and thus learn to master them to a limited extent.

In a relatively recent review by an Indian psycho-therapist, Thomas Janetius chess therapy is considered to be a form of creative therapy. Chess games may contain most of what one needs to know about the causes of his psychological troubles; they can reveal why a person is as they are—victim or martyr, sexually impotent, deprived child looking for adventure, etc.—but they can also show the remedy for the disorder. The unconscious, through chess games, is not concerned merely with putting right the things that have gone wrong. Chess games aim at well-being in the fullest sense; their goal is nothing less than complete personal victory or development in defeats, the creative unfolding of the potentialities that are contained in the analysis of the games played, whether won, lost or drawn.

In psychoanalysis chess games are wish fulfillment, and that an important part of these wish fulfillment are the result of repressed desires—desires that can scare a person so much that their games may turn into a series of defeats. Chess games can be divided into wishful games, anxiety games, and punitive games. Punitive games are in fact also fulfillment of wishes, though not of wishes of the instinctual impulses but of those of the critical, censoring, and punishing agency in the controlling minds. Thus, for Jungian Psychology chess imagery is part of a universal symbolic language. Roumen Bezergianov uses chess as a Logotherapy method, to help his clients discover and fulfill the meanings of their unique lives and life situations. He describes his method in the book Character Education with Chess.

Chess games are an open pathway toward true thoughts, emotions, and actions. Chess games enables the player to somehow see their aggressive impulses and desires. Chess games are a way of compensating for shortcomings in life. For instance, if a person is unable to stand up to his boss, he may safely lash out an attack at a chess piece in a chess game. Thus chess games offer some sort of satisfaction that may be more socially acceptable. Some of the major benefits that chess can offer come however, through its educational value for younger children. In fact, chess has been proven to aid in skills such as

- Focusing: Having to observe carefully and concentrate;
- Visualizing: Imagining a sequence of actions before it happens;
- Thinking ahead: With the concept of "think first, then act";
- Weighing options: Finding pros and cons of various actions;
- Analyzing Concretely: Logical decisions are better than impulsive;
- Thinking abstractly: Taught to consider the bigger picture;
- Planning: Developing long range goals and bringing them about;
- Juggling multiple considerations simultaneously: Having to weigh various factors all at once.

Throughout the US, a multitude of experiments have been conducted regarding the true educational value of chess. In Marina, CA, an experiment with chess indicated that after only 20 days of instruction, students' academic performance improved dramatically. It reported that 55% of students showed significant improvement in academic performance after only this brief time of chess instruction. Similarly, a 5-year study of 7th and 8th graders, by Robert Ferguson of the Bradford School District showed that test scores improved 17.3% for students regularly engaged in chess classes, compared with only 4.56% for children participating in other forms of "enrichment activities" such as Future Problem Solving, Problem Solving with Computers, independent study, and creative writing. These beneficial effects were also present among Special Education students, improving their ability to socialize, and reducing incidents of suspension at school by at least 60%.

Gestalt therapy seeks to fill emotional voids so as to become a unified whole. Some chess games contain the rejected, disowned parts of the self. Every chess piece, tactic, and/or strategy in a chess game represents an aspect of oneself as shown in a case involving a boy with Landau–Kleffner syndrome. In a sense, chess imagery is not part of a universal symbolic language because each chess game is unique to the individual who played it.

In Italy, the first study of chess therapy "The Game of Chess as an Educational Aid in Compulsory Schooling for Deaf-and-dumb Children" was conducted in 1992 from ASIS (Association for the Deaf). It was funded by the CNR (National Research Council), with the 92.02547.CT08 contract number. The research was conducted by psychologist and psychotherapist Massimo Marino, President of ASIS. Various searches that resulted in other publications were produced dall'ASIS about treatment failure. The synthesis of these studies are summarized in the "Book Scaccoterapia Complete Edition".

== See also ==
- List of therapies
- Psychiatry
- Psychology
- Symbolic interactionism
