= Conversational model =

The conversational model of psychotherapy was devised by the English psychiatrist Robert Hobson, and developed by the Australian psychiatrist Russell Meares. Hobson listened to recordings of his own psychotherapeutic practice with more disturbed clients, and became aware of the ways in which a patient's self—their unique sense of personal being—can come alive and develop, or be destroyed, in the flux of the conversation in the consulting room.

The conversational model views the aim of therapy as allowing the growth of the patient's self through encouraging a form of conversational relating called 'aloneness-togetherness'. This phrase is reminiscent of Winnicott's idea of the importance of being able to be 'alone in the presence of another'. The client comes to eventually feel recognised, accepted and understood as who they are; their sense of personal being, or self, is fostered; and they can start to drop the destructive defenses which disrupt their sense of personal being.

The development of the self implies a capacity to embody and span the dialectic of 'aloneness-togetherness'—rather than being disposed toward either schizoid isolation (aloneness) or merging identification with the other (togetherness). Although the therapy is described as psychodynamic, and is accordingly concerned to identify activity and personal meaning in the midst of apparent passivity, it relies more on careful empathic listening and the development of a common 'feeling language' than it does on psychoanalytic interpretation.

Psychotherapists can measure their adherence to the Conversational Model during any given therapy session with the Conversational Model Therapy Adherence Scale (CoMTAS).

== Psychodynamic Interpersonal Therapy (PIT) ==
In its manualised form ('PIT'), the conversational model is presented as having seven interconnected components. These are:

- Developing an exploratory rationale: Together with the patient generate an understanding which links emotional or somatic symptoms with interpersonal difficulties
- Shared understanding: In developing a shared understanding, the therapist uses statements rather than questions, uses mutual ('I' and 'We') language, deploys conditional rather than absolute statements of understanding, allows metaphorical elaborations of the patient's experience to unfold, and makes tentative interpretations or 'hypotheses' about the meaning of the patient's experience.
- Focus on the 'here and now': Feelings that are present in the room are encouraged; abstract talk about feelings by the therapist is discouraged.
- Focus on difficult feelings: Gently commenting on the presence of hidden feelings or the absence of expected feelings.
- Gaining insight: Interpretations are provided which link the dynamics of the current therapeutic interaction with problematic present and past interactions in the patient's life.
- Sequencing interpretations: The therapist does not jump in with explanatory interpretations before laying the groundwork of the therapeutic relationship and jointly understanding the emotions present in the room.
- Acknowledging change: Emotional changes that are made by the patient during therapy are offered positive reinforcement.

== Research ==
The conversational model, which has been manualised as Psychodynamic-Interpersonal Therapy, has been subject to outcome research, and has demonstrated effectiveness in the treatment of depression, psychosomatic disorders, self-harm, and borderline personality disorder.
