= Hip-hop therapy =

Therapy technique

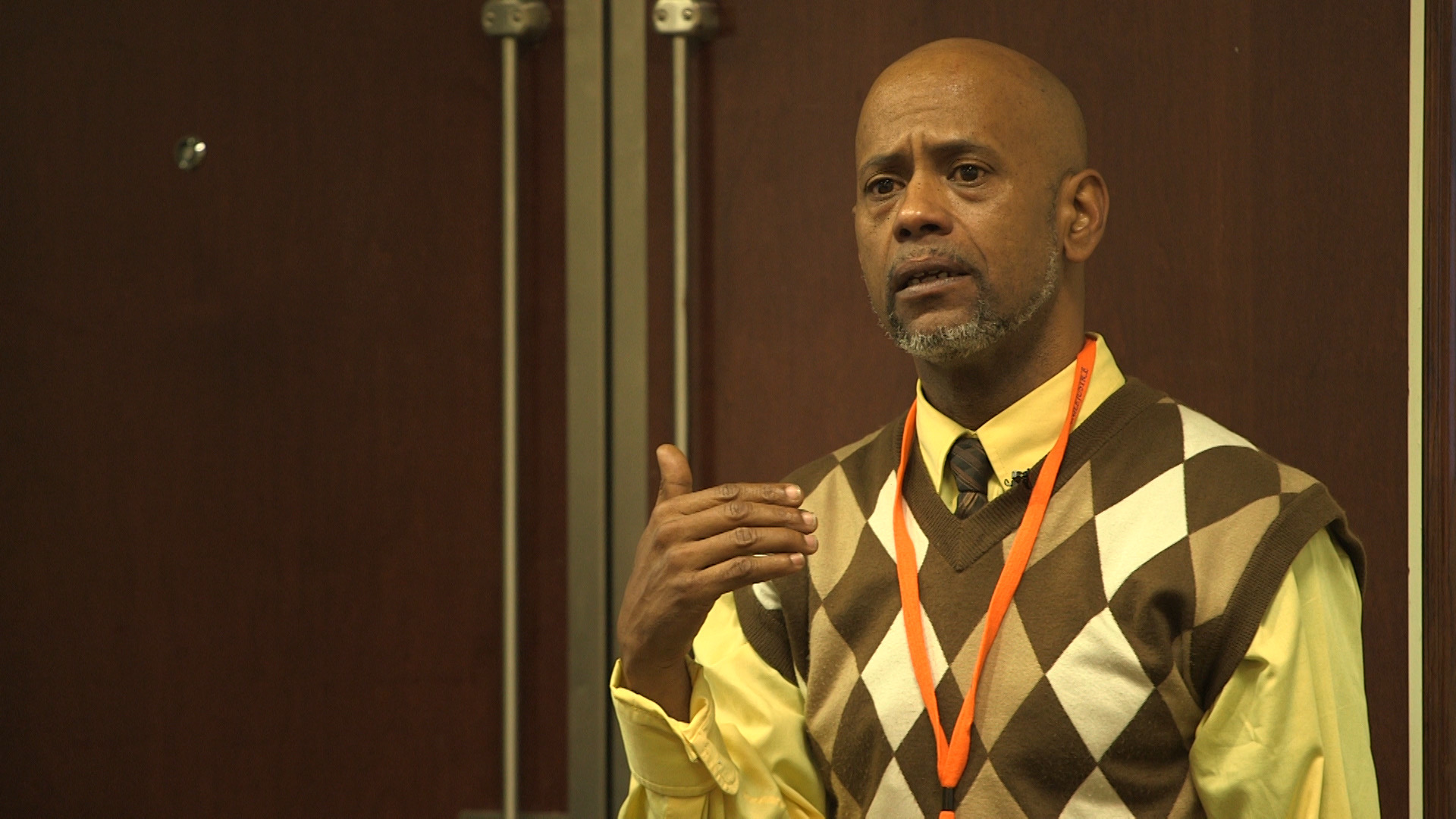
Dr. Edgar Tyson, the originator of Hip Hop Therapy, presenting at the 2016 Coalition of Juvenile Justice's National Disproportionate Minority Contact Conference in Baltimore, Maryland.

Hip-hop therapy (HHT) is a contemporary approach in mental health treatment that takes into account the profound impact of hip-hop culture and its capacity to promote individual and communal transformation. Dr. Edgar Tyson (1963-2018) coined the term and created the foundational model in 1996. Hip Hop therapy has evolved into a conceptual framework with significant global resonance. HHT refers to the purposeful use of Hip Hop culture by a mental health professional within the context of the therapeutic relationship. The approach embodies a wide array of interventions that mix the inherently cathartic components of the culture with well-established treatment models, from music therapy, poetry therapy and other expressive therapies to cognitive behavioral therapy and narrative therapy. Hip-hop therapy is a culturally relevant remix of therapeutic conceptions that revitalizes the many merits of established forms, including psychiatry, that have traditionally overlooked disenfranchised populations.

== Origins ==
Hip-hop therapy is rooted in the social work tradition as a strengths-based, culturally competent framework focused on fitting the model to the client. Although hip-hop has always been therapeutic for the communities that have produced it, Dr. Edgar Tyson developed the approach in attempts to systematically integrate the culture into mental health settings. In the mid-1990s, as a clinical social worker in a residential facility for homeless and justice-involved youth in Miami-Dade county, Tyson was inspired to incorporate hip-hop into individual and group therapy sessions. Upon witnessing the results, he decided to formally study the model's implementation, which would later be expounded upon in his pioneering scholarly article in 2002.

After conducting his initial study in 1997, Tyson presented his model at the 30th Annual Conference of the National Association of Black Social Workers in 1998. Tyson (1998) would also present that year at the 20th Annual Symposium for the Association for the Advancement of Social Work with Groups, which would serve as a guide for Ciardiello's (2003) implementation of HHT, where the therapeutic act of creating different aspects of the culture was introduced to the literature base. According to Tyson (2002), the most significant finding of his exploratory study was that most of the youth expressed the desire to create their own songs to share and discuss in group, which he would then go on to facilitate. Ciardiello (2003) effectively built off of this implication for further research, as have several others since.

Although Tyson's (2002) initial intervention focused primarily on hip-hop music, he emphasized that it "must be understood as one component and within the larger context of the hip-hop culture," which he referred to as the "central mechanism of HHT" (p. 134). Built within his founding model is the understanding that the music is but one artifact of a much larger culture and therefore cannot be analyzed in isolation. This is a key distinction that separates HHT from other rap music interventions, such as Elligan's (2000) Rap Therapy model. Thus, hip-hop therapy represents the prospective inclusion of each cultural facet into the therapeutic process. Hip-hop therapy is also a "source of empowerment to counteract the negative impact of hip-hop music on African American women" through their creation of lyrics or discussions around existing music. Robinson et al. has called for more research studies to be done to study the effects of hip-hop–based intervention programs for improving health literacy, health behavior, or mental health for children. Despite showing significant promise, research studies have been limited.

== Health Outcomes and Prevention ==
Research has proven that HHT can help "reduce depression and anxiety, improve emotional expression, expand communication and interpersonal skills, and potentially lift one’s self-esteem." According to HIV prevention specialists Carla Boutin-Foster et al. Hip-hop can be used as a tool for HIV prevention in adolescents through an innovative school-based (RHAP) program that uses hip- hop and rap music to raise awareness among high school youth about HIV/AIDS. Half of public school teens have admitted to being sexually active whereas 63% wear protection, making those who do not in danger of a sexually transmitted disease. The RHAP program was implemented into regular school hours through analyzing lyrical content of rap songs and discussing how it affects their views and habits. Students were asked feedback on their thoughts on the program. Students in the program reported that after the program they had a better understanding of the content of the music and how it relates to behaviors that increase the risk of HIV/AIDS.

Clinicians and social work practitioners advocate using culturally sensitive hip-hop–based interventions among urban African American substance-using youth to increase retention in prevention programs and successful cessation of drugs. Findings show that hip-hop therapy is an effective tool for clinicians to use, "not only to build rapport but to give their clients a voice.” Social workers are integrating rap based music intervention in social work practice with youth, particularly African-American and Latino youth "to insulate youths from the plethora of pitfalls that occur during adolescence."

One study found that hip-hop music can help listeners address environmental, socioeconomic, and family stressors.

== Use in schools and with youth and diverse populations ==
The Cleveland Clinic Children's Hospital for Rehabilitation (CCCHR) partnered with a non-profit to bring hip-hop therapy to pediatrics. This program engages "tweens and adolescents in working on their own narratives through music and lyrics, which can help them process their trauma." HHT has also been used with foster care youth and at-risk teen youth in residential treatment centers.

The use of hip-hop is used as a means of promoting cultural responsiveness within school counseling, incorporating culturally responsive approaches into counseling practice, which involves recognizing and valuing the unique cultural backgrounds and experiences of each student. Hip-hop and spoken word therapy can be effective tools to allow students to express themselves creatively while also connecting with their cultural roots. By embracing students' cultural backgrounds and using creative forms of expression, counselors can help foster a supportive, inclusive environment that values each student's unique voice and experiences. HHT in the schools can help young students feel seen, heard, and comfortable enough to talk about problems. Hip hop based interventions offer a hospitable environment that creates a space for Black and Brown youth to express their identity, foster peer and staff relationships, and contribute to a sense of confidence

HHT in the schools can also help improve learning and reduce stress and anxiety. A study on a hip hop counseling small group for adolescents known as Beats, Rhymes, and Life (BRL) showed that youth participating in this small group reported lower depression and anxiety symptoms. In addition to anxiety and depression, rap intervention in schools is effective for behavioral management, self-regulation, self-esteem, and overall psychological well-being.

== Global use ==
A European-based music program called COOL helps young and disadvantaged youth in Scotland. This program works with youth in low-income households, or who have experienced abuse or trauma and encourages them to open up through music, especially hip-hop. The program helps youth gain confidence in themselves, take part in productive activities, attend school, and overall it offers support to improve their mental well-being. In October 2019, in Barcelona, Spain, a pilot study was created to study the potential healing properties of Music and Hip-Hop Therapy for young asylum seekers and unaccompanied minors between the ages of 14 and 20.

In 2015, studies using hip-hop therapy were conducted at adolescent and adult correctional facilities in Sydney, Australia by Dr Kim Dilati. The goal of these studies were to determine what specifics aspects of HHT produced the best results. By the end of the four-year study, participants showed declines in symptoms such as depression and anxiety. Patients expressed common themes within their lyrics such as: lacking resources, previous experiences with therapy and coping with adversity.

== Models and applications ==
Research on culturally diverse youth has consistently shown that integrating hip-hop and rap music intervention in the counseling process enhances well-being by promoting increased awareness, empowerment, and the ability to process difficult emotions in a creative way. One Therapist recommends using contemporary artists for hip-hop therapy, like Jay-Z, Cardi B, Rick Ross. Some therapists recommend that youth clients record, repeat and play back their own rhymes to be able to express themselves and hear the results. Specific tools that incorporate hip-hop and mental health include mental health journaling, graffiti association, mental health group cyphers, student structured mixtapes, and community mental health awareness.

- Example prompts for the mental health journal strategy can include 'lyric writing as free association weather report'- Directions: "Today I will loop a hip hop instrumental for five minutes and would like you to: write 6-8 bars describing how you are feeling today."
- Graffiti association encourages students to draw, paint, collage pictures, words, or phrases to process emotional stress.
- Curated mixtapes: encourage students to compile their favorite pieces of music, or music that may represent a specific emotion/feeling (e.g., sad, happy, loved)

Additionally, there are structured rap psychotherapeutic interventions like Don Elligan's Rap Therapy and the 5 phases that have shown to be effective strategies for social workers working with at-risk youth.

Rap Therapy

Don Elligan's Rap Therapy is a culturally sensitive approach to psychotherapy originally developed for young African American men who have been influenced by rap images, stimuli, and music. The theoretical foundations are based on principles of social psychology and learning theory. Rap therapy can be utilized in both individual and group therapy. Rap therapy is designed to be easily integrated into a Cognitive Behavioral model treatment and should be adapted to be consistent with treatment goals and plans developed by the clinician for the client. Through collaborative exploration with clients, the therapist can help foster awareness of how personal beliefs and emotions contribute to problem behaviors and encourage positive change. RAP therapy has five phases that can be adapted to fit treatment goals. The phases are not a linear process, but are used as structured areas to guide the process. Phases like assessment and alliance are a continual process..

Five Phases of Rap Therapy
Phase	Goal
1. Assessment	Goal: Determine if the client is influenced by rap music and if they are an appropriate candidate (e.g., which artist the client likes, why they like those artists, why not other artists). Determine how the client is influenced by rap music and how their identity is shaped by music.
2. Alliance	Goal: Establish rapport and trust by being empathetic and supportive of the client's interests in rap music (e.g., listen to the rap music together)
3. Reframing	Goal: Broaden the client's scope of appreciation for rap music (e.g., review genres of rap; from violent to antisocial to humanistic promotion of family values and ethnic pride).
4. Role Play with reinforcements	Goal: Get involved in the creative process of rap music through written exercises. The clinician must model and reinforce styles of rap that are consistent with the treatment plan.
5. Action & Maintenance	Goal: Continue the writing process about specific issues related to the treatment plan and transition the client's writing into action through positive reinforcement.
