= Pulsing (bodywork) =

Pulsing is a rhythmic, movement-based somatic therapy that can be classed as a form of post-Reichian bodywork. It uses a very gentle and nurturing approach in an attempt to increase body awareness and sensitivity.

== History ==
Pulsing was developed in the late 1970s by Curtis Turchin, a practitioner of Postural Integration (PI). After seeing Dr Milton Trager, founder of the Trager Approach, demonstrate his movement-based bodywork at the Esalen Institute in the mid-1970s Turchin was inspired to develop a systematic approach that he called Pulsing.

== Forms and practice ==
It involves the application of pressure and movement (stretching, lifting, shaking, rotating and swinging) to the soft tissue of the body (skin, muscles, tendons, ligaments and fascia) within a continuous soft rhythmic rocking. The client is encouraged to be passive - in the sense of not trying to do anything, but allowing the body to relax into the movements. This in itself quickly highlights areas of muscular tension and holding.

Children and adults will often rock themselves when distressed: there appears to be a deep comfort and security to be found in gentle movement. With its flowing and wave-like movements, Pulsing perhaps recalls a body-memory of the foetal experience in the womb, where the baby is constantly subject to rhythmic pulsation, or of being cradled and rocked during infancy.

Pulsing can take a number of forms, distinguished by the intent with which it is approached by both client and therapist (for example, relaxing, playful or as deeper emotional therapy). In the 'lighter' modes, clients sometimes experience gentle emotional release and often enter a trance-like state. Sessions usually have a deeply relaxing yet energising effect. Here the benefits may include a release of deep physical tension, an increase in flexibility and movement repertoire, and an improved general sense of well-being and energy. On a deeper level, it can also be performed explicitly as a form of body psychotherapy, encouraging the client to become aware of their emotional responses, patterns of breathing and physical areas where "they feel tense, tight, weak, uncomfortable or painful and aware of protective holding patterns". In this way clients may discover and release deeply embodied emotions. Whichever form is used, many of the effects of Pulsing occur below the level of conscious awareness and continue to resonate in the bodymind for some time after sessions.

== See also ==
- Body psychotherapy
- Somatic psychology
