= Insight-oriented psychotherapy =

Category of psychotherapy relying on conversation

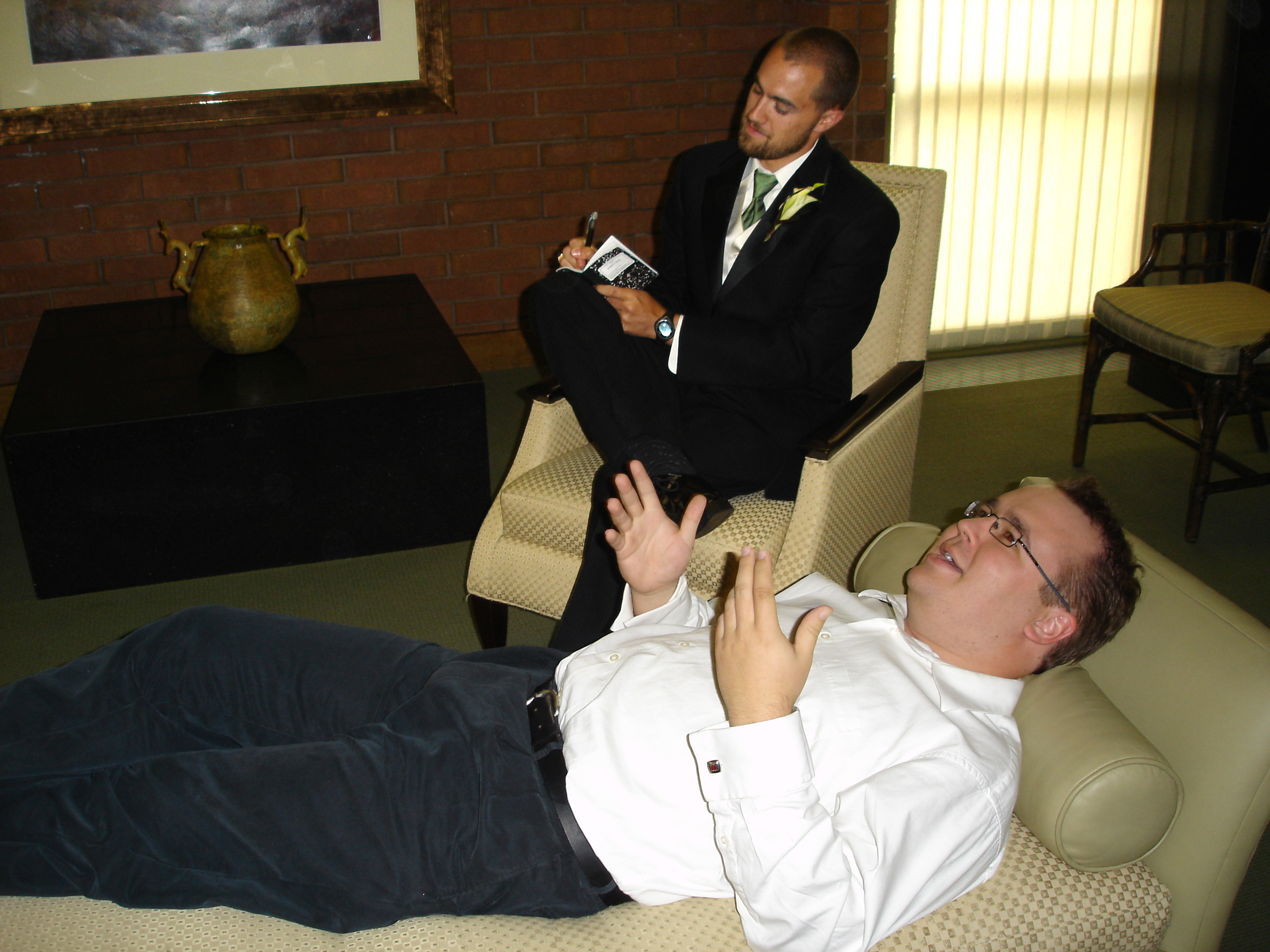
A session with a psychotherapist

Insight-oriented psychotherapy is a category of psychotherapies that share the assumption that psychological symptoms and maladaptive patterns of behavior arise, at least in part, from limited awareness of one's own motivations, emotions, and relational patterns, and that increased self-understanding ("insight") is a central mechanism of therapeutic change. Insight in this sense refers to a patient's understanding of associations between past and present experiences, recurring relationship patterns, and the connection between interpersonal challenges, emotional experience, and psychological symptoms.

Approaches commonly classified as insight-oriented include psychoanalysis, psychodynamic psychotherapy, Gestalt therapy, existential therapy, person-centered therapy, and interpersonal psychotherapy, as well as integrative treatments that draw on these traditions. Insight-oriented therapies are typically distinguished from "supportive" psychotherapies, which prioritize reinforcing existing coping mechanisms and adaptive functioning over uncovering unconscious or out-of-awareness material, although in clinical practice the two approaches are often combined.

== Overview ==
Forms of insight-oriented psychotherapy include psychoanalysis and Gestalt therapy. Insight oriented psychotherapy places a large emphasis on personal discovery for the patient. Through dedication to trust filled conversations, the patient will go through a process of enlightenment with the therapist. The patient will begin to understand significant life events of theirs as triggers or agents of change for how they live their lives today. Researchers have concluded that Insight has a clinically significant effect on the therapeutic outcomes of psychotherapy, to the point where it is now considered as relevant as long-standing factors like empathy, positive regard and therapeutic alliance.

== History ==
The oldest form of insight-oriented psychotherapy was developed by Freud and is known as psychoanalysis.Freud avoided ordinary experimental methods and sought to establish the case history as a method of research. His first main collection of case histories was included in his book titled Studies on Hysteria. In this book, Freud and Breuer argued that regaining repressed memories associated with trauma would lead to resolution of dissociative amnesia and the associated psychological symptoms.

== Empirical evidence ==
=== Efficacy of insight-oriented therapies ===
Insight-oriented psychotherapies, particularly short-term and long-term psychodynamic psychotherapy, have accumulated substantial empirical support. A 2017 meta-analysis of 23 randomized controlled trials concluded that psychodynamic therapy was non-inferior to other empirically supported treatments for a range of mental disorders. A 2023 umbrella review in World Psychiatry applying updated criteria for empirically supported treatments concluded that psychodynamic therapy meets criteria as an evidence-based treatment for depressive, anxiety, somatic symptom, eating, and personality disorders in adults.

=== Insight as a mechanism of change ===
A 2018 meta-analysis published in the American Journal of Psychiatry aggregated 23 effect sizes from studies on the relationship between patient insight and psychotherapy outcome, and reported a moderate positive association (r = 0.31) that was consistent across diagnostic categories and theoretical orientations, including cognitive-behavioral and experiential therapies as well as psychodynamic treatments. The magnitude of this association is comparable to effect sizes reported for established therapeutic factors such as the therapeutic alliance. Contemporary scholarship has therefore framed insight not as a feature unique to psychoanalytic or psychodynamic treatment but as a transtheoretical mechanism of change, while noting ongoing methodological challenges in measuring insight reliably and establishing causal direction.

== Role of therapist ==
The two main roles for the therapist are to stay neutral and abstinent towards their patients. Patients who are engaging with Insight-oriented psychotherapy attempt to build a trust-infused rapport with the therapist. It is believed that patients will be able to speak freely without feeling judgement if they understand that their therapist is not reacting, either positively or negatively towards what the patient is saying. In this way, the therapist is keeping a neutral disposition towards the patient.

== Issues ==
The popular treatment methods used can also generate placebo insights within clients. Since patients may face a lot of pressure in the therapeutic encounter, they may experience "insights" such as illusions, deception, or adaptive self-misunderstandings—and it can also generate therapeutic artifacts that seem to confirm these insights.

Different treatment options based on other assumptions about certain ameliorative factors in psychotherapy have been affected by this trend towards shorter treatment procedures. Insight-oriented therapies have generally consisted of treatment approaches that share the premise that behavior is disturbed in some manner through a lack of client awareness.

Many problems have emerged in clinical treatment settings, in large part due to time limitations, as well as the restricted, minimal focus placed upon each of the above types of treatment.

== Case study ==
In one example of insight-oriented psychotherapy, a nearly middle aged woman was having difficulty with her cancer treatment. The treatments themselves were not the issue. The issue was that this cancer patient was confusing her past, tumultuous relationships with her current ones—specifically with the doctors who were supposed to be treating her. "Associations to the follow-up pelvic exams and second-look surgery (which was negative) reminded her of her father's violation and denigration of women. She felt as though she was subjecting herself to yet another uncaring man who was out to hurt and humiliate a woman." It was ultimately these realizations that the patient came to in her insight-oriented sessions that allowed her to continue her cancer treatment.
