= Dialectical behavior therapy =

Cognitive-behavioral psychotherapy for emotional dysregulation

The skills modules in dialectical behavior therapy

Dialectical behavior therapy (DBT) is an evidence-based psychotherapy that began with efforts to treat personality disorders and interpersonal conflicts. Evidence suggests that DBT can be useful in treating mood disorders and suicidal ideation as well as for changing behavioral patterns such as self-harm and substance use. DBT evolved into a process in which the therapist and client work with acceptance and change-oriented strategies and ultimately balance and synthesize them as comparable to the philosophical dialectical process of thesis and antithesis, followed by synthesis.

This approach was developed by Marsha M. Linehan, a psychology researcher at the University of Washington. She defines it as "a synthesis or integration of opposites". DBT was designed to help people increase their emotional and cognitive regulation by learning about the triggers that lead to reactive states and by helping to assess which coping skills to apply in the sequence of events, thoughts, feelings, and behaviors to help avoid undesired reactions. The treatment was first described in detail in her 1993 book Cognitive-Behavioral Treatment of Borderline Personality Disorder. Linehan later disclosed to the public her own struggles and belief that she has borderline personality disorder.

DBT grew out of a series of failed attempts to apply the standard cognitive behavioral therapy (CBT) protocols of the late 1970s to chronically suicidal clients. Research on its effectiveness in treating other conditions has been fruitful. DBT has been used by practitioners to treat people with depression, drug and alcohol problems, post-traumatic stress disorder (PTSD), traumatic brain injuries (TBI), binge eating disorder, and mood disorders. Research indicates that DBT might help patients with symptoms and behaviors associated with spectrum mood disorders, including self-injury. Work also suggests its effectiveness with sexual-abuse survivors and chemical dependency.

DBT combines standard cognitive-behavioral techniques for emotion regulation and reality-testing with concepts of distress tolerance, acceptance, and mindful awareness largely derived from contemplative meditative practice. DBT is based upon the biosocial theory of mental illness and is the first therapy that has been experimentally demonstrated to be generally effective in treating borderline personality disorder (BPD). The first randomized clinical trial of DBT showed reduced rates of suicidal gestures, psychiatric hospitalizations, and treatment dropouts when compared to usual treatment. A meta-analysis found that DBT reached moderate effects in individuals with BPD. DBT may not be appropriate as a universal intervention, as it was shown to be harmful or have null effects in a study of an adapted DBT skills-training intervention in adolescents in schools.

== Overview ==
DBT is sometimes considered a part of the "third wave" of cognitive-behavioral therapy, as DBT adapts CBT to assist patients in dealing with stress. DBT focuses on treating disorders that are characterized by impulsivity and emotional dysregulation.

DBT strives to have the patient view the therapist as an accepting ally rather than an adversary in the treatment of psychological issues: many treatments at this time left patients feeling "criticized, misunderstood, and invalidated" due to the way these methods "focused on changing cognitions and behaviors." Accordingly, the therapist aims to accept and validate the client's feelings at any given time, while, nonetheless, informing the client that some feelings and behaviors are maladaptive, and showing them better alternatives. In particular, DBT targets self-harm and suicide attempts by identifying the function of that behavior and obtaining that function safely through DBT coping skills. DBT focuses on the client acquiring new skills and changing their behaviors, with the ultimate goal of achieving a "life worth living".

In DBT's biosocial theory of BPD, clients have a biological predisposition for emotional dysregulation, and their social environment validates maladaptive behavior.

DBT skills training alone is being used to address treatment goals in some clinical settings, and the broader goal of emotion regulation that is seen in DBT has allowed it to be used in new settings, for example, supporting parenting. There has been little study into adapting DBT into an online environment, but a review indicates that attendance is improved online, with comparable improvements for clients to the traditional mode.

== Four modules ==
=== Mindfulness ===
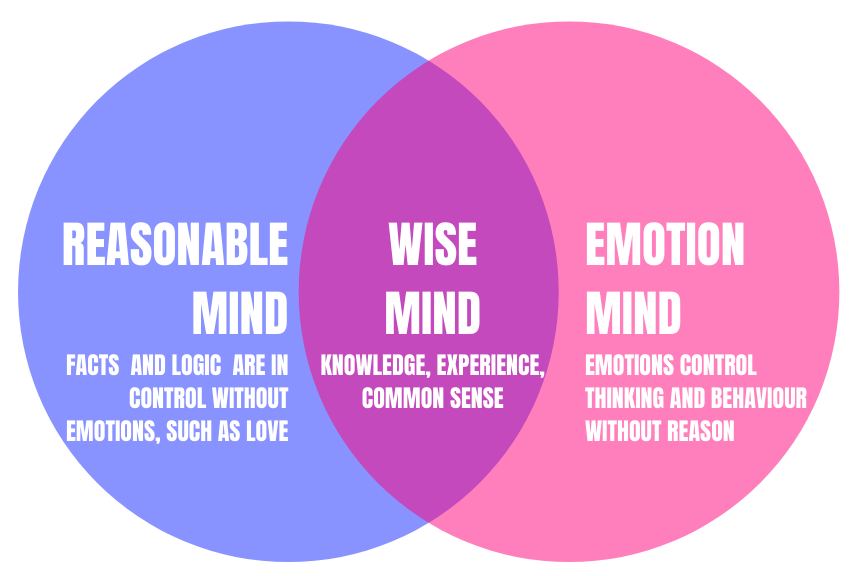
DBT wise mind—the synthesis of the two opposites: reasonable mind and emotion mind

Mindfulness is one of the core ideas behind all elements of DBT. It is considered a foundation for the other skills taught in DBT, because it helps individuals accept and tolerate the powerful emotions they may feel when challenging their habits or exposing themselves to upsetting situations.

The concept of mindfulness and the meditative exercises used to teach it are derived from traditional contemplative religious practice, though the version taught in DBT does not involve any religious or metaphysical concepts. Within DBT, it is the capacity to pay attention, nonjudgmentally, to the present moment; about living in the moment, experiencing one's emotions and senses fully, yet with perspective. The practice of mindfulness can also be intended to make people more aware of their environments through their five senses: touch, smell, sight, taste, and sound. Mindfulness relies heavily on the principle of acceptance, sometimes referred to as "radical acceptance". Acceptance skills rely on the patient's ability to view situations with no judgment, and to accept situations and their accompanying emotions. This causes less distress overall, which can result in reduced discomfort and symptomology.

==== Acceptance and change ====
The first few sessions of DBT introduce the dialectic of acceptance and change. The patient must first become comfortable with the idea of therapy; once the patient and therapist have established a trusting relationship, DBT techniques can flourish. An essential part of learning acceptance is to first grasp the idea of radical acceptance: radical acceptance embraces the idea of facing situations, both positive and negative, without judgment. Acceptance also incorporates mindfulness and emotional regulation skills, which depend on the idea of radical acceptance. These skills, specifically, are what set DBT apart from other therapies.

Often, after a patient becomes familiar with the idea of acceptance, they will accompany it with change. DBT has five specific states of change which the therapist will review with the patient: pre-contemplation, contemplation, preparation, action, and maintenance. Precontemplation is the first stage, in which the patient is completely unaware of their problem. In the second stage, contemplation, the patient realizes the reality of their illness: this is not an action, but a realization. It is not until the third stage, preparation, that the patient is likely to take action, and prepares to move forward. This could be as simple as researching or contacting therapists. Finally, in stage 4, the patient takes action and receives treatment. In the final stage, maintenance, the patient must strengthen their change in order to prevent relapse. After grasping acceptance and change, a patient can fully advance to mindfulness techniques.

There are six mindfulness skills used in DBT to bring the client closer to achieving a "wise mind", the synthesis of the rational mind and emotional mind: three "what" skills (observe, describe, participate) and three "how" skills (nonjudgementally, one-mindfully, effectively).

=== Distress tolerance ===
The concept of distress tolerance arose from methods used in person-centered, psychodynamic, psychoanalytic, gestalt, and/or narrative therapies, along with religious and spiritual practices. Distress tolerance means learning to bear emotional discomfort skillfully, without resorting to maladaptive reactions. Healthier coping behaviors are learned, including intentional self-distraction, self-soothing, and 'radical acceptance.'

Distress tolerance skills are meant to arise naturally as a consequence of mindfulness. They have to do with the ability to accept, in a non-evaluative and nonjudgmental fashion, both oneself and the current situation. It is meant to be a non-judgmental stance, one of neither approval nor resignation. The goal is to become capable of calmly recognizing negative situations and their impact, rather than becoming overwhelmed or hiding from them. This allows individuals to make wise decisions about whether and how to take action, rather than falling into intense, desperate, and often destructive emotional reactions.

=== Emotion regulation ===
Individuals with borderline personality disorder and suicidal individuals are frequently emotionally intense and labile. They can be angry, intensely frustrated, depressed, or anxious. The theory holds that intense emotions are conditioned responses to distressing experiences, which serve as the conditioned stimuli. Emotional regulation skills are taught to help patients modify their conditioned responses.

Dialectical behavior therapy skills for emotion regulation include:

- Learning how to understand and name emotions: the patient focuses on recognizing their feelings. This segment relates directly to mindfulness, which also exposes a patient to their emotions.
- Identify obstacles to changing emotions
- Changing unwanted emotions: the therapist emphasizes the use of opposite-reactions, fact-checking, and problem solving to regulate emotions. While using opposite-reactions, the patient targets distressing feelings by responding with the opposite emotion.
- Reducing vulnerability: the patient learns to accumulate positive emotions and to plan coping mechanisms in advance, in order to better handle difficult experiences in the future.
- Increasing mindfulness to current emotions
- Taking opposite action
- Applying distress tolerance techniques
- Managing extreme conditions: the patient focuses on incorporating their use of mindfulness skills to their current emotions, to remain stable and alert in a crisis.

=== Interpersonal effectiveness ===
The three interpersonal skills focused on in DBT include self-respect, treating others "with care, interest, validation, and respect", and assertiveness. The dialectic involved in healthy relationships involves balancing the needs of others with the needs of the self, while maintaining one's self-respect.

== Tools ==
=== Diary cards ===
Specially formatted diary cards can be used to track relevant emotions and behaviors. Diary cards are most useful when they are filled out daily. The diary card is used to find the treatment priorities that guide the agenda of each therapy session. Both the client and therapist can use the diary card to see what has improved, gotten worse, or stayed the same.

=== Chain analysis ===
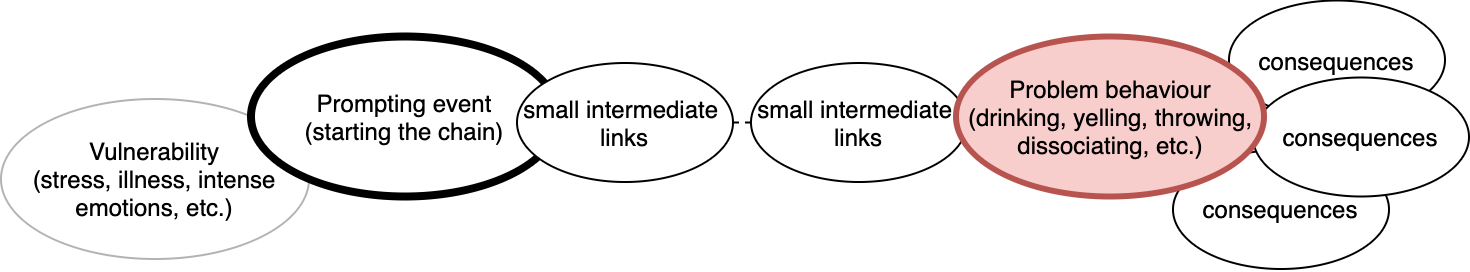
Chain analysis— from a prompting event to the problem behavior and consequences

Chain analysis is a form of functional analysis of behavior but with increased focus on sequential events that form the behavior chain. It has strong roots in behavioral psychology in particular applied behavior analysis concept of chaining. A growing body of research supports the use of behavior chain analysis with multiple populations.

== Efficacy ==
=== Borderline personality disorder ===
DBT is the therapy that has been studied the most for treatment of borderline personality disorder, and there have been enough studies done to conclude that DBT is helpful in treating borderline personality disorder. Several studies have found there are neurobiological changes in individuals with BPD after DBT treatment.

=== Depression ===
A Duke University pilot study compared treatment of depression by antidepressant medication to treatment by antidepressants and dialectical behavior therapy. A total of 34 chronically depressed individuals over age 60 were treated for 28 weeks. Six months after treatment, statistically significant differences were noted in remission rates between groups, with a greater percentage of patients treated with antidepressants and dialectical behavior therapy in remission.

=== Complex post-traumatic stress disorder (CPTSD) ===
Exposure to complex trauma, or the experience of prolonged trauma with little chance of escape, can lead to the development of complex post-traumatic stress disorder (CPTSD) in an individual. The American Psychiatric Association (APA) does not recognize CPTSD as a diagnosis in the DSM-5 (Diagnostical and Statistical Manual of Mental Disorders, the manual used by providers to diagnose, treat and discuss mental illness), though many practitioners argue that CPTSD is separate from post-traumatic stress disorder (PTSD). As of 2020, over 40 studies from 15 different countries had "consistently demonstrated the distinction between PTSD and CPTSD" and "replicated the distinct symptoms associated with each disorder" according to a 2021 literature review.

CPTSD is similar to PTSD in that its symptomatology is pervasive and includes cognitive, emotional, and biological domains, among others. CPTSD differs from PTSD in that it is believed to originate in childhood interpersonal trauma, or chronic childhood stress, and that the most common precedents are sexual traumas. Currently, the prevalence rate for CPTSD is an estimated 0.5%, while PTSD's is 1.5%. Numerous definitions for CPTSD exist. Different versions are contributed by the World Health Organization (WHO), The International Society for Traumatic Stress Studies (ISTSS), and individual clinicians and researchers.

Most definitions revolve around criteria for PTSD with the addition of several other domains. While the APA may not recognize CPTSD, the WHO has recognized this syndrome in its 11th edition of the International Classification of Diseases (ICD-11). The WHO defines CPTSD as a disorder following a single or multiple events which cause the individual to feel stressed or trapped, characterized by low self-esteem, interpersonal deficits, and deficits in affect regulation. These deficits in affect regulation, among other symptoms are a reason why CPTSD is sometimes compared with borderline personality disorder (BPD).

==== Similarities between CPTSD and borderline personality disorder ====
In addition to affect dysregulation, case studies reveal that patients with CPTSD can also exhibit splitting, mood swings, and fears of abandonment. Like patients with borderline personality disorder, patients with CPTSD were traumatized frequently and/or early in their development and never learned proper coping mechanisms. These individuals may use avoidance, substances, dissociation, and other maladaptive behaviors to cope. Thus, treatment for CPTSD involves stabilizing and teaching successful coping behaviors, affect regulation, and creating and maintaining interpersonal connections. In addition to sharing symptom presentations, CPTSD and BPD can share neurophysiological similarities, for example, abnormal volume of the:

- Amygdala (emotional memory)
- Hippocampus (memory)
- Anterior cingulate cortex (emotion)
- Orbitofrontal cortex (personality)

Another shared characteristic between CPTSD and BPD is the possibility for dissociation. Further research is needed to determine the reliability of dissociation as a hallmark of CPTSD, however it is a possible symptom. Because of the two disorders' shared symptomatology and physiological correlates, psychologists began hypothesizing that a treatment which was effective for one disorder may be effective for the other as well.

==== DBT as a treatment for CPTSD ====
DBT's use of acceptance and goal orientation as an approach to behavior change can help to instill empowerment and engage individuals in the therapeutic process. The focus on the future and change can help to prevent the individual from becoming overwhelmed by their history of trauma. This is a risk especially with CPTSD, as multiple traumas are common within this diagnosis. Generally, care providers address a client's suicidality before moving on to other aspects of treatment. Because PTSD can make an individual more likely to experience suicidal ideation, DBT can be an option to stabilize suicidality and aid in other treatment modalities.

Some critics argue that while DBT can be used to treat CPTSD, it is not significantly more effective than standard PTSD treatments. Further, this argument posits that DBT decreases self-injurious behaviors (such as cutting or burning) and increases interpersonal functioning but neglects core CPTSD symptoms such as impulsivity, cognitive schemas (repetitive, negative thoughts), and emotions such as guilt and shame. The ISTSS reports that CPTSD requires treatment which differs from typical PTSD treatment, using a multiphase model of recovery, rather than focusing on traumatic memories. The recommended multiphase model consists of establishing safety, distress tolerance, and social relations.

Because DBT has four modules which generally align with these guidelines (Mindfulness, Distress Tolerance, Affect Regulation, Interpersonal Skills) it is a treatment option. Other critiques of DBT discuss the time required for the therapy to be effective. Individuals seeking DBT may not be able to commit to the individual and group sessions required, or their insurance may not cover every session.

A study co-authored by Linehan found that among women receiving outpatient care for BPD and who had attempted suicide in the previous year, 56% additionally met criteria for PTSD. Because of the correlation between borderline personality disorder traits and trauma, some settings began using DBT as a treatment for traumatic symptoms. Some providers opt to combine DBT with other PTSD interventions, such as prolonged exposure therapy (PE) (repeated, detailed description of the trauma in a psychotherapy session) or cognitive processing therapy (CPT), an established trauma-focused cognitive therapy that aims to challenge dysfunctional trauma-associated cognitions and emotions.

For example, a regimen which combined PE and DBT would include teaching mindfulness skills and distress tolerance skills, then implementing PE. The individual with the disorder would then be taught acceptance of a trauma's occurrence and how it may continue to affect them throughout their lives. Participants in clinical trials of this DBT PE regimen exhibited a decrease in symptoms, and throughout the 12-week trial, no self-injurious or suicidal behaviors were reported. Later trials similarly show increased effectiveness versus DBT.

Another argument which supports the use of DBT as a treatment for trauma hinges upon PTSD symptoms such as emotion regulation and distress. Some PTSD treatments such as exposure therapy may not be suitable for individuals whose distress tolerance and/or emotion regulation is low. Biosocial theory posits that emotion dysregulation is caused by an individual's heightened emotional sensitivity combined with environmental factors (such as invalidation of emotions, continued abuse/trauma), and tendency to ruminate (repeatedly think about a negative event and how the outcome could have been changed).

An individual who has these features is likely to use maladaptive coping behaviors. DBT can be appropriate in these cases because it teaches appropriate coping skills and allows the individuals to develop some degree of self-sufficiency. The first three modules of DBT increase distress tolerance and emotion regulation skills in the individual, paving the way for work on symptoms such as intrusions, self-esteem deficiency, and interpersonal relations.

Noteworthy is that DBT has often been modified based on the population being treated. For example, in veteran populations DBT is modified to include exposure exercises and accommodate the presence of traumatic brain injury (TBI), and insurance coverage (i.e. shortening treatment). Populations with comorbid BPD may need to spend longer in the "Establishing Safety" phase. In adolescent populations, the skills training aspect of DBT has elicited significant improvement in emotion regulation and ability to express emotion appropriately. In populations with comorbid substance use, adaptations may be made on a case-by-case basis.

For example, a provider may wish to incorporate elements of motivational interviewing (psychotherapy which uses empowerment to inspire behavior change). The degree of substance use should also be considered. For some individuals, substance use is the only coping behavior they know, and as such the provider may seek to implement skills training before targeting substance reduction. Inversely, a client's substance use may be interfering with attendance or other treatment compliance and the provider may choose to address the substance use before implementing DBT for the trauma.

== See also ==
- Acceptance and commitment therapy – Form of cognitive behavioral psychotherapy
- Behaviour therapy – Branch of psychotherapy
- Cognitive emotional behavioral therapy – Mental health conditions
- Mentalization-based treatment – Form of psychotherapy
- Nonviolent Communication – Communication process intended to increase empathy
- Rational emotive behavior therapy – Psychotherapy
- Social skills – Competence facilitating interaction and communication with others
