= Rational living therapy =

Form of cognitive behavioural therapy

Rational living therapy (RLT) is a form of cognitive behavioral therapy (CBT) developed by Aldo R. Pucci, Psy.D., DCBT the current president of the National Association of Cognitive-Behavioral Therapists and founder of the Rational Living Therapy Institute.

RLT utilizes elements of rational emotive behavior therapy, rational behavior therapy, and cognitive therapy in a systematic approach in which the therapy progresses through a series of set points.

RLT is a motivational therapy which utilizes Rational Motivational Interviewing techniques to help the client effect positive change. It utilizes empirical research in the areas of linguistics, cognitive development, learning theory, general semantics, neuro functioning, social psychology and perception, and linguistics.

Rational living therapy avoids diagnosing clients according to the criteria set forth in the Diagnostic and Statistical Manual of Mental Disorders (DSM). The belief is that the diagnoses in the DSM only serve to label a series of behaviors and by doing so creates a negative perception in the client that they "have" or "suffer from" a "disorder" which leads to a feeling of hopelessness and therefore impedes positive change.

RLT doesn't adhere to the standard CBT emphasis on "self acceptance" and does not adhere to the common concepts of self-esteem and self-confidence instead utilizing what Pucci refers to as the "Four A's" and concentrating on rational self counseling and underlying assumptions the client may have. The belief is that by doing so the therapy takes on a deeper role leading to more long term behavioral change.

An optional component termed rational hypnotherapy is also utilized by some therapists. It is believed hypnotherapy serves as an addendum to the conventional talk aspects of the therapy speeding along and facilitating the process. RLT therapists are certified via taking additional training.

== See also ==
- Rational emotive behavior therapy
