= Regulation-focused psychotherapy for children =

Regulation-Focused Psychotherapy for Children (RFP-C) is a short-term, time-limited psychodynamic treatment approach for children with disruptive behavior disorders, including oppositional defiant disorder (ODD), conduct disorder (CD), attention deficit/hyperactivity disorder (ADHD), and disruptive mood dysregulation disorder (DMDD). RFP-C consists of 16 individual play therapy sessions plus 4 sessions with the child's caregiver(s) only. The basis for the therapeutic process in RFP-C is that all behavior has meaning and that some children engage in disruptive behaviors as a way to avoid experiencing painful or threatening emotions such as guilt, shame, and sadness. RFP-C is an alternative to traditional cognitive-behavioral strategies used in the treatment of disruptive behavior, which employ principles of behavior modification as tools to manage behavior. Instead, RFP-C is affect-oriented, and clinicians using RFP-C focus on understanding the child's inner world and subjective experience and communicating this inner experience to the child in a developmentally appropriate way. RFP-C conceptualizes aggressive and antisocial behaviors as products of emotional dysregulation. The goals of the child sessions are to: (1) identify which of the child's emotions are being avoided, (2) understand how the emotion is being avoided and (3) explore why the emotion is being avoided in a maladaptive way. The goals of the caregiver sessions are to (1) obtain clinical background information, (2) develop the therapeutic alliance, and (3) provide psycho-education to aid in caregivers’ understanding of the child's difficulties. The ultimate goal of RFP-C is to help the caregiver and child understand that all behavior, even disruptive behavior, has meaning in the service of emotional and behavioral regulation. This insight leads to a decreased need to act on the distressing emotions (i.e. less need for disruptive behaviors) and an increased ability to tolerate, work through, and talk about the feelings that previously needed to be warded off. RFP-C utilizes a modified version of the Malan triangle of conflict in case conceptualization and in parent work to help support the child's development of more adaptive implicit emotion regulation capacities.

RFP-C was codified in 2016 with the publication of the Manual Of Regulation-Focused Psychotherapy for Children (RFP-C) With Externalizing Behaviors: A Psychodynamic Approach. This short-term psychodynamic psychotherapy has demonstrated evidence in a pilot study, a randomized controlled trial, and an online, school-based program during the COVID-19 pandemic.

Ongoing education and research related to RFP-C is supported by the non-profit, Center for Regulation Focused Psychotherapy which offers online training and consultation, as well as research grants.
