= School-based family counseling =

School-based family counseling (SBFC) is an integrated approach to mental health intervention that focuses on both school and family in order to help children overcome personal problems and succeed at school. SBFC is practiced by a wide variety of mental health professionals, including: psychologists, social workers, school counselors, psychiatrists, and marriage and family therapists, as well as special education teachers. What they all share in common is the belief that children who are struggling in school can be best helped by interventions that link family and school. SBFC is typically practiced at the school site, but may be based in a community mental health agency that works in close collaboration with schools.

== The Need for SBFC ==
Family problems, such as marital discord, divorce, financial difficulties, child abuse and neglect, life-threatening illness, sibling in a gang, and poor parenting skills are associated with a wide variety of children's problems, e.g. delinquency, depression, suicide attempts, and substance abuse. These family problems can have a negative effect on children's learning and school behavior. However, there is research showing that healthy families that cope effectively with their problems help children succeed at school. Traditionally trained school counselors and school psychologists may lack the family counseling training necessary to help students who are experiencing problems at home. If school personnel recommend that a parent seek counseling from a community agency for family problems, the parent and family may not go because of the stigma associated with therapy or because of restrictions imposed by managed care. SBFC reduces the stigma associated with therapy by emphasizing that counseling for family members has an educational goal: helping the student to succeed at school. Parents, guardians, and family members are approached as partners with the SBFC professional, all working together to promote school success. The SBFC professional is an advocate for the child, the family, and the school. Some of the problems SBFC approaches have been used to address are: bullying and cyber-bullying, depression, marital problems, school violence, grief and loss, trauma, life-threatening illness, school crises, learning disorders, immigrant families, suicide, and school suspension. Some examples of large SBFC programs are: "The Copper River Project" in Copper River District Alaskan schools; and "Place2Be" - a SBFC program based in over 200 British schools.

== Origins ==
The earliest pioneer of SBFC was Alfred Adler, the Austrian psychiatrist who developed 30 guidance clinics attached to schools in Vienna in the 1920s. Through these guidance clinics Adler and his colleagues counseled parents and teachers (often both together in large meetings where both groups were present) on how to help children overcome problems at home and school. This Adlerian home-school approach to counseling was strength-based with its emphasis on helping children develop Social Interest.

== Later Developments ==
With the advent of World War II, the Vienna guidance clinics closed. The psychiatrist Rudolf Dreikurs, who worked with Adler, emigrated to the USA in the 1930s and popularized the Adlerian approach to home-school intervention through books like: Children the Challenge (for parents), Maintaining Sanity in the Classroom (for teachers), and Discipline Without Tears (for parents and teachers). In the USA, during the 1950s, 60's, and 70's the mental health professions developed somewhat independently of each other with the result that children having difficulty at school would typically be seen by a school counselor or school psychologist. Children having difficulty at home would typically be seen by a community-based mental health professional. Beginning in the 1970s the mental health literature begins to show an increasing emphasis on linking home and school interventions. By 2000 there existed a substantial literature on the integration of family and school counseling approaches.

== Strengths of SBFC ==
SBFC is a strength-based approach to counseling that emphasizes working with parents and guardians as partners. It emphasizes integrating intervention (remedial) and prevention approaches at school and in the family. This emphasis on working collaboratively with parents and guardians in order to help their children succeed in school is appealing to families because of its educational focus. It allows for counselors to hold interventions with students to connect school preparation with future career options is critical for the ever-developing technological work economy. SBFC is also a culturally sensitive counseling approach because it reduces the stigma associated with the mental health professions. This approach is practiced by many different mental health professionals and educators.

== Evidence-based Support for SBFC ==
Evidence-based support for the effectiveness of SBFC comes from numerous randomized control group studies employing combined school and family interventions. This research indicates positive effects at post and follow up tests for problem behaviors at home and at school, and also for Latino, African American, Native American, and Thai children and families as well. The challenges of working with low income families are well known in the mental health literature. . However, SBFC programs such as the Center for Child & Family Development SBFC program, the Families and Schools Together (Fast) program, and the Linking the Interests of Families and Teachers (LIFT) program were designed precisely to engage these families. There are several randomized control group studies demonstrating the effectiveness of SBFC with low income families.

== SBFC Challenges and Solutions in Low-Income Communities ==
The SBFC approach focuses on reducing family and school problems (such as school violence, trauma, and other challenges experienced by immigrants and low-income families) and increasing family and school resources in order to strengthen child well-being. An important part of SBFC is eliciting the support of the family. This section describes common challenges experienced by school mental health professionals when working with low income communities and how SBFC is designed to address these challenges.

=== Challenge: Developing Parent Support ===
SBFC requires family members' participation. This can be a challenge for those students whose family members are not available to go to workshops and trainings either because they cannot take time out of work or because they do not support or relate to the principles of the SBFC approach. Students seeking counseling to navigate difficulties of the immigrant family experience often have family members who work long hours and cannot give time to the trainings of the SBFC method of counseling. Immigrant families rarely have the time, or the language literacy, to help their children navigate school institutions which can create a disconnect between school counseling programs and immigrant households. The processes of acculturation and assimilation are slow and delicate; their complications extend to a lack of understanding of the Western practice of multicultural progressive school counseling. People in immigrant households may have different traumas and experiences that make them feel lost, depressed, stuck with regard to life choices, and alienated from all formal institutions of mainstream society, including schools. School counseling is often stigmatized by immigrant families because school counselors often approach immigrant students with English-only career tests and one-size-fits-all resource guides. Immigrants students are often subject to ethnic stereotypes by school counselors; for example, Hispanics are considered physical laborers and not scholars and Asian immigrant students are held to higher academic standards and considered intelligent Common ethnic stereotypes assumed by school counselors undermine the intended impact of the SBFC approach.

SBFC Solutions SBFC addresses these challenges in a number of ways. First, school transformation is a fundamental SBFC premise. Schools must change to accommodate the needs of parents and families and to avoid marginalization of immigrant and low-income parents Strickland, 2020). A common SBFC approach to involve parent is for the SBFC practitioner to have flexible hours that (for example) would permit the SBFC practitioner to work from 12-8 pm on a weekday and work every second Saturday. Further, many SBFC practitioners trained in working with families understand the need to address barriers. This may result in the SBFC practitioner visiting the family in the home to establish a relationship, explore barriers, and make a plan that works for moving forward based on the family's needs. This SBFC flexibility makes it easier for working parents to meet with the SBFC practitioner. In situations where it is impossible for the parents to meet with the SBFC practitioner, the SBFC practitioner will reach out to the parents using the phone, the internet (email and Zoom), and sending letters. Research on immigrant parents shows that they value schools reaching out to them if it is done in a respectful and culturally sensitive manner. Second, it is a hallmark of the SBFC approach to treat the parents/guardians with respect and as equal partners with the SBFC practitioner. The family is viewed as a source of strength for children and that even in dysfunctional families there are family members willing to advocate for the educational success of a child. Assessing family strengths is basic to the SBFC approach. Third, the parents/guardians are approached – not for therapy – but for consultation on how to help their child succeed at school. This educational approach, rather than a therapy approach, is very appealing to immigrant and low-income families who may not regard therapy as a solution and who are not comfortable with traditional Eurocentric approaches to therapy that emphasize individualism and assertiveness. Schools have a long history of marginalizing immigrant and low income parents, but approaches like SBFC that emphasize respect, caring, cultural humility, and reaching out to parents, can increase parent involvement in schools. School personnel trained in SBFC may be in the best position to implement SBFC because the focus in a school setting is on improving student functioning for success as opposed to addressing mental health issues which is frequently stigmatized in immigrant communities. Most parents are willing to attend counseling sessions at a school versus attending family therapy at a community health clinic. Fourth, multicultural competence is an essential part of the SBFC approach. Gerrard, 2020, pp. 51–59). For example, when working with Latino/a immigrant families, SBFC practitioners understand the role of familia and educacion: that the valuing of family and education is a core part of the culture and that parent involvement may be expressed by home-support rather than school visits. Parent home-support for children's academic performance and well-being includes: support for doing homework, having a quiet place to study, emphasizing respect for teachers, discussing future plans, and excusing chores so that more time can be spent on homework.

==== Challenge:School violence ====
School violence is often a response to a lack of present family members which can be correlated with an economy demanding extremely long work hours for low-income household survival. Low-income families that are constantly working can be less active participants in their children's schools and upbringing. Studies note that many low-income communities lack mentors who can stress the value of schooling, which in turn correlates to student disengagement and an increase in acting out and violent behavior. Lack of engagement among community members can translate to a lack of parent involvement in schooling institutions which can impede the counselor-teacher partnership the SBFC approach urges. Low-income communities' high numbers of population turnover rates, lack of strong well-funded institutions, and displacement of people from their neighborhoods not only increases school violence among students, but can also create a disconnection between households and local institutions. Students in low-income communities with high crime rates are more prone to commit violence in their local schooling institutions which can promote fear into many students yet students in general are prone to stay silent when approached by school administration to speak about this issue. Violence in schooling institutions is often normalized by parents due to constant violence in their communities which then disrupts possible connections between counselors and parents. The high rates of school violence within low-income urban schools can lead to traumatic stress which is often neglected by low-income/ethnic minority families while only further undermines the SBFC method of counseling.

SBFC Solutions SBFC practitioners address school violence in a number of ways. As a general strategy, SBFC practitioners collaborate with school administrators and teachers to increase student engagement. Student engagement refers to: having a sense of belonging and being a part of the school;experiencing teacher support and caring; having friends at school; and experiencing fair and effective discipline. SBFC strategies to promote student engagement include: promoting a positive school climate; strengthening school organization and infrastructure; and facilitating student interactions. Studies show that increasing student engagement reduces bullying and school dropout, and creates "caring schools" that are family-friendly and create a safe place for communities where violence is prevalent.

Student engagement falls largely in the area of prevention through the SBFC meta-model and framework. Student engagement is a vital construct to be used in prevention and intervention efforts that target issues related to dropout prevention, bullying, and the behaviors associated with the disengagement of students to school (academic failure, chronic absenteeism, behavioral issues). Student engagement is the central construct in student dropout. It is the slow process of disengagement that contributes to student dropout. There are disproportionate rates of student dropout, chronic absenteeism, and behavior-related suspensions for black and latino/a students. Focusing on student engagement through the SBFC systemic model provides an infrastructure of protective factors that can mitigate negative influences and prevent involvement in school or community violence. Implementation of student engagement interventions through the SBFC model focusing on school prevention and family prevention have been found to be highly associated with student outcomes. SBFC practitioners following the SBFC meta-model focus their interventions on school prevention and family intervention which largely includes a "whole-school" approach engaging multiple stakeholders, most importantly families. SBFC also places importance on developing community resources to reduce school problems. Community violence is a complex problem and not easily solved – but SBFC practitioners view community intervention as part of their approach to helping children, families and schools.

==== Challenge: Trauma and mental health access ====
Low-income households often do not validate students' traumatic experiences and can show little interest in attending training with school counselors. Being low-income can produce various traumas that most families tend to ignore, creating a culture of mental health negligence and a lack of proper self care within these households. A 2008 survey shows that the mental health needs of the poor are often unmet due to the lack of insurance coverage. A 2015 study found that 48% of whites received mental health services compared to 31% of African Americans and Hispanics, and 22% of Asians. Mental health negligence can be attributed to low-income communities being often misdiagnosed and misunderstood with their trauma or mental healthcare overall. SBFC approaches can also fail to account for ethnic/cultural attitudes toward mental health. For example, Mexican American families were found to have a lower rate of mental health problems due to the strong cultural belief of natural healing in comparison to traditional psychiatric services.

SBFC Solutions Although SBFC practitioners often offer parent education training at school and community sites, parent consultation is the form of counseling most frequently provided by SBFC. Parent consultation can also be provided by phone or internet (Zoom) for parents who do not want to visit the school or community counseling center. While many low-income parents are not interested in participating in "therapy", many are very interested in seeing their children succeed at school and welcome the opportunity to speak with a SBFC practitioner who treats them with respect and approaches them as equal partners in helping their child succeed. (Gerrard, Carter, & Ribera, 2020). Parents who do not feel comfortable attending a parent education workshop at their child's school, may welcome meeting with the SBFC practitioner at the school or in a home visit, or through brief weekly phone calls. In rare situations where contact between the parents and SBFC counselor is not feasible, SBFC practitioners may use a family systems counseling approach with students that helps them to relate more constructively to their family and strengthen family relationships. Most SBFC programs based in schools, such as the Center for Child & Family Development Mission Possible program, the Families and Schools Together (FAST) program, the Linking the Interests of Families and Teachers (LIFT) program, and the Place2Be program were developed especially to reach low-income families and are free for students and families, making mental health services accessible to low income families. The educational focus of SBFC services also makes mental health counseling more accessible to these same families.

== Barriers to Entry for SBFC ==
The development of SBFC programs requires both cross-disciplinary and cross-cultural thinking and a willingness to set aside mental health professional "turf" issues. Graduates of mental health discipline academic programs who have not been exposed to other mental health professions, may develop a "silo" approach to mental health that leads to competition and "turf" battles with professionals from other disciplines. Strategies to overcome interprofessional barriers to SBFC practitioners include: using discipline inclusive language (e.g. SBFC practitioner rather than SBFC counselor, SBFC social worker, etc.; becoming familiar with the SBFC literature in other mental health professions; fostering a collaborative relationship with members of other mental health disciplines; gathering evidence-based support for your SBFC program; developing support from administrators leading the organization in which you are practicing an SBFC approach.

== Examples of Books on School-Based Family Counseling ==
- Boyd-Franklin, L. & Hafer Bry, B. (2000). Reaching out in family therapy. New York, NY: The Guilford Press.
- Dreikurs, R.; Cassel, P. (1965). Discipline without tears. New York, NY: Harper and Row.
- Fine, Marvin J. & Carlson C . (Eds.). (1992) Family-school intervention: A systems perspective. New York, NY:Allyn and Bacon.
- Gerrard, B. & Soriano, M. (Eds.) (2013). School-based family counseling: Transforming family-school relationships. Phoenix, AZ: CreateSpace.
- Gerrard, B., Carter, M. & Ribera, D. (Eds.).(2019). School-based family counseling: An interdisciplinary practitioner's guide. London, UK: Routledge.
- Hinckle, J. & Wells, M. (1995). Family counseling in the schools. Greensboro, NC: ERIC/CASS Publications.
- Laundy, K. C. (2015). Building School-Based Collaborative Mental Health Teams: A Systems Approach to Student Achievement. Camp Hill, PA: TPI Press.
- Miller, L. D. (Ed.) (2002). Integrating school and family counseling: Practical solutions. Alexandria, VA: American Counseling Association.
- Palmatier. Larry L. (1998) Crisis Counseling For A Quality School Community: A family perspective. New York, NY: Taylor & Francis.
- Sherman, R., Shumsky, A. & Roundtree, Y. (1994) Enlarging the Therapeutic Circle. New York, NY: Brunner/Mazel.
- Sheridan, S. & Kratochwill, T. (2008) Conjoint behavioral consultation, promoting family-based connections and interventions. New York, NY:Springer.
- Shute, R. & Slee, P. (Eds.). (2016). Mental health and wellbeing through schools: The way forward. London, UK: Routledge.
- Steele W. & Raider M. (1991). Working With Families in Crisis: School-based intervention. New York, NY: The Guilford Press.
- Walsh, W. & Giblen, N. (Eds) (1988). Family counseling in school settings. Springfield, Il: Charles C. Thomas.
- Walsh, W. & Williams, G. (1997) Schools and Family Therapy: Using Systems Theory and Family Therapy in the Resolution of School Problems. New York, NY: Charles C. Thomas.
