= Heimler method of human social functioning =

Heimler Method of Human Social Functioning (Human Social Functioning, HSF, sometimes referred to as The Heimler Method) is a form of psychotherapy that uses a patient's own language and thought forms to aid them in finding their own solutions.

Eugene Heimler developed this approach from his work in the United Kingdom within the National Health Service in the late 1950s and early 1960s (drawing on his earlier life experience in WWII concentration camps). He formulated a unique structure for counseling along with a questionnaire called The Heimler Scale of Social Functioning (HSSF).

HSF is ideal for focused short-term work which is goal- and action-orientated, it can be used among diverse patient groups, by a variety of professional disciplines on a one-to-one basis, with couples, or with groups. These include counseling (at all levels), supervision (management, coaching, training and counseling), staff support, and meetings (formal as well as informal).

== A method of therapy ==
In HSF, the therapist is taught to listen at depth, rather than hear and interpret, and thus is more likely to genuinely share another's world. Many patients prefer this method of help. The underlying ethos "the client knows best" enables the therapist to support individuals to make their own choices within their own framework. The expertise of this approach lies in being a genuine and effective listener rather than providing a framework in which to understand people's problems.

For the listening process to be effective a structure is helpful to both participants. The stages of this can be identified, quickly learned and readily applied.

This structure for listening has applications within a number of spheres from problem solving to a deeper psychotherapeutic approach or in team development; with adults or children.

As a further structuring to the interviewing process, the HSSF can also be administered during counseling. Research has yielded detailed analysis that accurately identifies support needs and appropriate therapeutic responses with great accuracy. Some of the research studies concentrated on identifying specific coping patterns while others have examined the diagnostic and predictive use of the HSSF. Other practitioners have described the use of HSF method with different types of groups, for instance with family therapy.

== HSF theory and method ==
Heimler's theory reflects John Donne's well-known statement that "no man is an island entire of itself", that it is our relationships, positively or negatively perceived, that give life its meaning. For Heimler this means that society has a pivotal role with its more deprived members to permit connection and meaning in their environment, and that we can exist as sane or useful people only as long as we can transform and utilise the negative in us.

Heimler's principles include the importance of the relationship between satisfaction and frustration. He observed that "those who functioned in society ... had the common feature of a subjectively felt satisfaction that corresponded with their level of bearable frustration." Too much frustration or too little satisfaction is detrimental to good functioning for an individual. The person's life experience is valued and used as a resource for healing in addition to recognizing where their energy is distributed. This enables the person to make changes that will allow more positive use of energy.

Another important principle which Heimler introduces is the use of the individual's past experience to dialogue with the present experience and project on to the future. Using a process, called the "Fragmenta Vitae", the person is enabled to become aware of the current emotional triggers and helped to access their early antecedents recalling childhood stories with the same emotional content. By engaging with the child in the past, the individual is encouraged to dialogue between the present and the past and to a projected future. This can help break patterns from the past and provide for an altered future outcome.

Heimler understood his theory in a developmental model with three levels. Briefly put: Level 1 (L1) is the infant world of instinctual responses to pleasure or pain; Level 2 (L2) "revolves" around L1 as it were by taking the growing and developed child into social interactions with all the satisfactions and frustrations this can entail; while Level 3 (L3) revolves around life itself, often as a more dominant force in later life, but as well, a creative force than many people tap into from earlier years. All these levels are relatively fluid as development ebbs and flows.

Heimler identified that "when a psychiatric or medical history is taken, it is looking at what is wrong or what went wrong" [and he continues:] "... rarely ... will you find ... that which seeks what is right with people". The HSF method sets out the whole of a client's current experience so that positive and negative can be set together and the client can see her/himself as a whole. In this methodology, the individuals stand firmly at the centre of their own world, exerting their will and abilities to change their own situation. Rodway sums up Heimler's philosophy as: "the belief that man has choices, that choices should be made available to man and that freedom is equated with self-determination as man makes his choices".

Heimler's approach engages with the need to clarify the crux of the problem so as to facilitate a remedy. Although the concepts of social functioning were not new, Heimler sought a practical integrative tool which would "focus on the positive, and how frustrations, abnormalities and difficulties could be turned into ultimate gain". Heimler recognised that his ideas were not original but he sought an integrative whole which would offer a therapeutic tool. Along with his colleagues he produced a visual scale that showed to both therapist and client the connection between the individual's subjective experience and objective reality.

=== Training ===
HSF training is largely experientially-based with participants using their own life material when learning the interviewing techniques. Further training in therapeutic applications follows a similar pattern and incorporates imaginative techniques. Traditionally those wishing to use the HSSF have had to complete the full Human Social Functioning methodology with its disciplined structured mirroring approach as well as the administration of the HSSF. However most practitioners have a prior training in a form of counseling and find it irksome to learn another approach. Although HSF practitioners still consider that the methodology has its own distinctive value, there is a recognition that many want to use the HSF more as an assessment and add-on to their own core practice. Training in the Heimler scale includes an understanding of the ethos of the scale, administration, calculation, understanding, therapeutic aspects as well as the diagnostic opportunities it affords. Learning is through practical administration, video practice in feedback and written work to achieve a required standard in diagnosis and scale analysis. Training in the full HSF method is open to anyone with a professional health care qualification, taking 60 training hours with 20–40 hours of private study. For those who have prior counselling training, the HSSF (tool specific) training takes 30 hours with 20–30 hours of private study. Successful participants to both parts receive a certificate from The British Association of Social Functioning (BASF) and practitioner status with Heimler International. HSF training from qualified trainers in HSF has been recognised by BACP as contributing to the theory and skills development hours that are required for BACP accreditation.

== Heimler Scale of Social Functioning ==
The Heimler Scale of Social Functioning (HSSF) is a unique tool in that it covers a wide area of an individual's life experience, encouraging him to see himself in his societal setting. It was initially developed in the 1960s and has been widely used in a variety of contexts. It sets out, through a series of 55 questions (most of them answered by a simple "Yes", "No", or "Perhaps"), a pattern of energies in terms of "Satisfactions" and "Frustrations". It also puts these alongside an overall (existential) life view – Outlook. Satisfactions are set out in 25 questions under five headings: "Work", "Finance", "Friends", "Family (past & present)", and "Personal". These are set alongside Frustrations where there are also five areas, each with a sub-set of five questions: "Activity", "Health", "Influences", "Moods", and "Escape Routes". The final section, the Outlook, has five questions, which are answered in terms of a scale response.

While recognising its diagnostic capabilities, Heimler used the scale primarily as an aid to counseling. From early in its development, researchers have shown it to be an extremely sophisticated diagnostic instrument. The balance of Satisfactions to Frustrations provides an accurate picture of how well a person feels that he or she is coping, what help, if any, they may require, and likely outcomes. These energy balances vary according to how life is being experienced at the time of filling in the questionnaire. How these energies are distributed allows for a deeper analysis and therapeutic use of the scale. More recently, through research studies, it has also come to light that definite themes emerge among different groups of people. For instance those in the caring professions are likely to be more questioning and flexible in their life approach than top managers in industry, and very high achievers in sport have greater frustration than those whom they beat. Administration of the Scale is a simple matter and takes about 15–20 minutes to complete: scoring the questionnaire allows for an immediate diagnosis of support needs. A deeper analysis of the answers can be deduced in a comparatively short period of time compared with what would otherwise take hours of interviewing. The discipline of this analysis takes time and patience to acquire – that of understanding a person's world from within and seeing the logic of that world. Once acquired it is an invaluable aid to genuine understanding and sensitive response.

== Criticism ==
Criticism has largely centred around the lack of availability of the HSSF for peer review. The copyright that was meant to protect it from abuse in the hands of non-practitioners had the effect of removing it from the critical analysis of those who use psychometric tools. Despite considerable interest and research in its earlier years, this restrictive copyright has continued to prevent appropriate scrutiny. The Eugene Heimler Literary Trust (EHLT) has now accepted this and is taking steps, albeit belatedly to permit the scale to be disseminated more widely for the purpose of such examination. Another area for concern has been the response range to the questions: "Yes", "Perhaps" and "No" have been thought to be too limited and it has been suggested that a Likert scale with a range between 1 and 5 might give more accurate results. Van Breda, a moderate critic of the HSSF, attempted to test this out, using a large number of scales, but found that similar results were obtained when the original scale and the Likert scale were used.
