= List of forms of alternative medicine =

This is a list of articles covering alternative medicine topics.

== A ==
- Activated charcoal cleanse
- Acupressure
- Acupuncture
- Affirmative prayer
- Alexander technique
- Alternative cancer treatments
- Animal-assisted therapy
- Anthroposophical medicine
- Apitherapy
- Applied kinesiology
- Aquatherapy
- Aromatherapy
- Asahi Health
- Astrology
- Attachment therapy
- Auditory integration training
- Auriculotherapy
- Autogenic training
- Autosuggestion
- Ayurveda

== B ==
- Bach flower therapy
- Balneotherapy
- Bates method
- Bibliotherapy
- Biodanza
- Bioresonance therapy
- Blood irradiation therapies
- Body-based manipulative therapies
- Body work (alternative medicine) or Massage therapy

== C ==
- Chelation therapy
- Chinese food therapy
- Chinese herbology
- Chinese martial arts
- Chinese medicine
- Chinese pulse diagnosis
- Chakra
- Chiropractic
- Chromotherapy (color therapy, colorpuncture)
- Cinema therapy
- Coding (therapy)
- Coin rubbing
- Colloidal silver therapy
- Colon cleansing
- Conversion therapy
- Colon hydrotherapy (Enema)
- Craniosacral therapy
- Creative visualization
- Crystal healing
- Cupping

== D ==
- Dance therapy
- Detoxification
- Detoxification foot baths
- Dietary supplements
- Dowsing

== E ==
- Ear candling
- Eclectic medicine
- Electromagnetic therapy
- Electrohomeopathy
- Equine-assisted therapy
- Expressive therapies
- Extracorporeal Blood Oxygenation and Ozonation (EBOO)
- Energy medicine
  - Earthing
  - Magnet therapy
  - Reiki
  - Qigong
  - Shiatsu
  - Therapeutic touch
  - Energy psychology

== F ==
- Faith healing
- Fasting
- Feldenkrais method
- Feng shui
- Five elements
- Flower essence therapy
- Functional medicine
- Fengyou essence

== G ==
- German New Medicine
- Grahamism
- Grinberg Method
- Gua sha
- Graphology

== H ==
- Hair analysis (alternative medicine)
- Hatha yoga
- Havening
- Hawaiian massage
- Herbalism
  - Herbal therapy
  - Herbology
- Hijama
- Holistic living
- Holistic medicine
- Homeopathy
- Home remedies
- Hydrotherapy
- Hypnosis
- Hypnotherapy

== I ==
- Introspection rundown
- Iridology
- Isolation tank
- Isopathy

== J ==
- Jilly Juice

== L ==
- Laughter therapy
- Light therapy

== M ==
- Macrobiotic lifestyle
- Magnetic healing
- Manipulative therapy
- Manual lymphatic drainage
- Martial arts
- Massage therapy
- Massage
- Medical intuition
- Meditation
  - Mindfulness meditation
  - Transcendental meditation
  - Vipassana
- Meridian (Chinese medicine)
- Mega-vitamin therapy
- Mind–body intervention
  - Alexander technique
  - Aromatherapy
  - Autogenic training
  - Autosuggestion
  - Bach flower therapy
  - Feldenkrais method
  - Hatha yoga
  - Hypnotherapy
- Moxibustion
- Myofascial release

== N ==
- Naprapathy
- Natural Health
- Natural therapies
- Nature therapy
- Naturopathic medicine
- New Thought
- Neuro-linguistic programming
- Nutritional healing
- Nutritional supplements
- Numerology

== O ==
- Orthopathy
- Osteopathy

== P ==
- Pilates
- Postural Integration
- Pranic healing
- Prayer
- Psychic surgery
- Prokarin

== Q ==
- Qi
- Qigong
- Quantum healing

== R ==
- Radionics
- Rebirthing
- Recreational Therapy
- Reflexology
- Reiki
- Rolfing Structural Integration
- Rosen Method

== S ==
- Salt Therapy
- Self-hypnosis
- Shiatsu
- Siddha medicine
- Sonopuncture
- Sophrology
- Sound therapy
- Spiritual mind treatment
- Structural Integration
- Support groups

== T ==
- Tai chi
- Tantra massage
- Tapas Acupressure Technique
- Tarot divination
- Daoyin
- Thai massage
- Thalassotherapy
- Therapeutic horseback riding
- Therapeutic touch
- Tibetan eye chart
- Traditional Chinese medicine
  - History of traditional Chinese medicine
- Traditional Korean medicine
- Traditional Japanese medicine
- Traditional Mongolian medicine
- Traditional Tibetan medicine
- Trager approach
- Transcendental meditation
- Trigger point
- Tui na

== U ==
- Unani medicine
- Urine therapy
- Uropathy

== V ==
- Vaginal steaming
- Vastu Shastra
- Vegetotherapy
- Visualization (cam)
- Visualization

== W ==
- Water cure (therapy)
- Wellness (alternative medicine)
- Wuxing (Chinese philosophy)

== Y ==
- Yoga
  - Ashtanga yoga
  - Ashtanga vinyasa yoga
  - Bikram yoga
  - Hatha yoga
  - Iyengar yoga
  - Kundalini yoga
  - Siddha yoga
  - Sivananda yoga
  - Tantric yoga
  - Viniyoga
  - Vinyasa yoga
  - Yoga Therapy
  - Daoyin Taoist Yoga

== Z ==
- Zang fu
