= Health information on Wikipedia =

Popular medical websites in July 2019

The Wikipedia online encyclopedia has, since the late 2000s, served as a popular source for health information for both laypersons and, in many cases, health care practitioners. Health-related articles on Wikipedia are popularly accessed as results from search engines, which frequently deliver links to Wikipedia articles. Independent assessments have been made of the number and demographics of people who seek health information on Wikipedia, the scope of health information on Wikipedia, and the quality and reliability of the information on Wikipedia.

The English Wikipedia was estimated in 2014 to hold around 25,000 articles on health-related topics. Across Wikipedia encyclopedias in all languages there were 155,000 health articles using 950,000 citations to sources and which collectively received 4.8 billion pageviews in 2013. This amount of traffic makes Wikipedia one of the most consulted health resources in the world, or perhaps the most consulted resource. A 2024 quantitative content analysis determined that "a sample of popular Wikipedia health-related articles for both sexes had comparable quality."

== Amount of health content ==
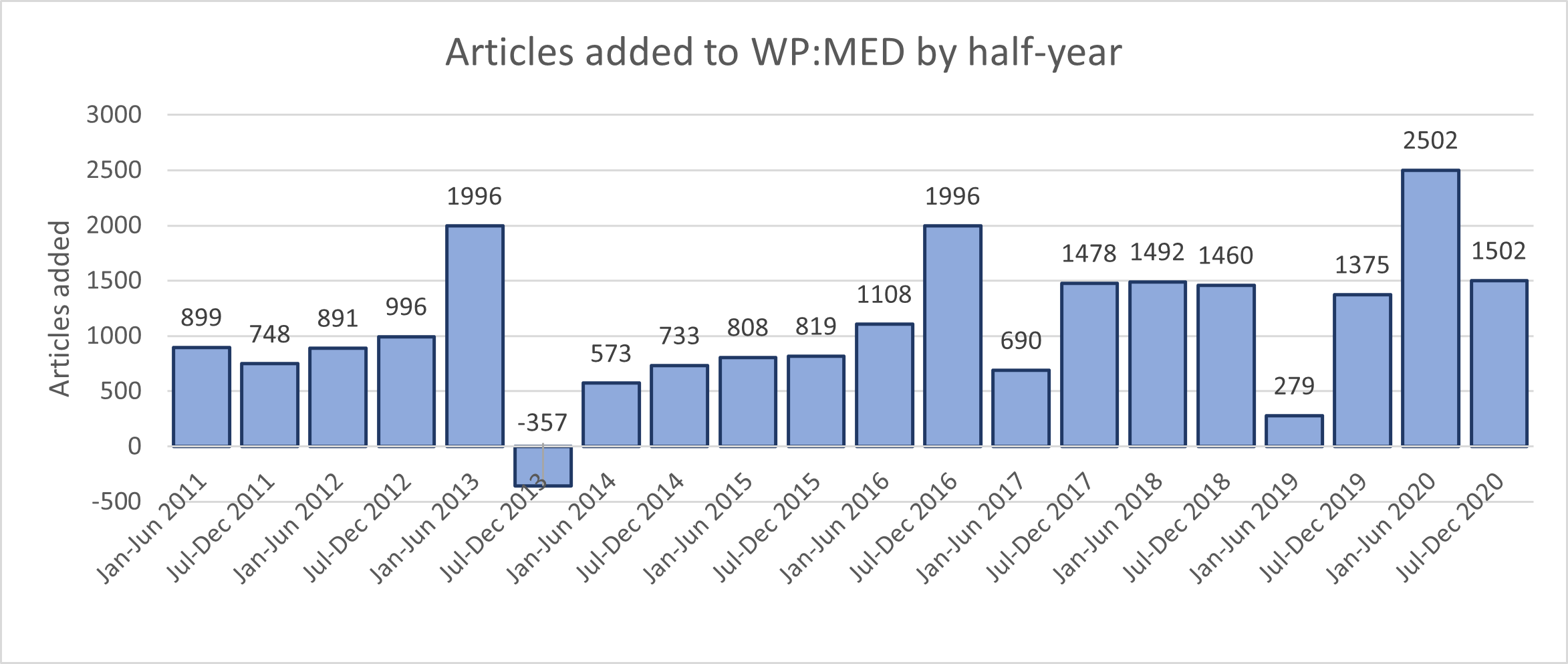
Number of medical articles added to Wikipedia per half year, 2011 to 2020

As of the end of 2013, the English Wikipedia had 29,072 medical articles, while across all language versions of Wikipedia, there were 155,805 medical articles.

As of March 2017, the English Wikipedia had 30,000 medical articles, while there were 164,000 medical articles in other languages.

As of 2017, there were about 6,000 anatomy articles on the English Wikipedia; these are not classified as "medical articles" in Wikipedia's categorization scheme and thus are not included in the 30,000 figure above.

== Academic studies ==
=== Accuracy and usefulness ===
A 2007 study examined a sample of Wikipedia pages about the most frequently performed surgical procedures in the United States, and found that 85.7% of them were appropriate for patients and that these articles had "a remarkably high level of internal validity". However, the same study also raised concerns about Wikipedia's completeness, noting that only 62.9% of the articles examined were free of "critical omissions". A 2008 study reported that drug information on Wikipedia "has a more narrow scope, is less complete, and has more errors of omission" than did such information on the traditionally edited online database Medscape Drug Reference. A 2010 study found that Wikipedia's article on osteosarcoma was of decent quality, but that the National Cancer Institute (NCI)'s page was better. The authors concluded that Wikipedia should include external links to higher-quality sources.

A 2011 assessment of 50 medical articles on Wikipedia found that 56% of the references cited on these pages could be considered reputable, and that each entry contained 29 reputable sources on average. A 2011 study examined Wikipedia pages about five statins, and concluded that these pages did not contain incorrect or misleading information, but that they were often missing information about drug interactions and contraindications to use. Another 2011 study examining Wikipedia articles on the 20 most widely prescribed drugs found that seven of these articles did not have any references, and concluded that "Wikipedia does not provide consistently accurate, complete, and referenced medication information."

An assessment of Wikipedia articles in 2012 on dietary supplements found that Wikipedia articles were "frequently incomplete, of variable quality, and sometimes inconsistent with reputable sources of information on these products."

A 2013 scoping review published in the Journal of Medical Internet Research summarized the existing evidence about the use of wikis, Wikipedia and other collaborative writing applications in health care and found that the available research publications were observational reports rather than the primary research studies which would be necessary to begin drawing conclusions.

A 2014 study that examined 97 Wikipedia articles about complementary and alternative medicine (CAM) found that 4% of them had attained "Good article" status, and that CAM articles on Wikipedia tended to be significantly shorter than those about conventional therapies.

In May 2014, The Journal of the American Osteopathic Association published an article which concluded that "Most Wikipedia articles for the 10 costliest conditions in the United States contain errors compared with standard peer-reviewed sources." Following this paper, many other media sources reported that readers should not trust Wikipedia for medical information. Some of Wikipedia's prominent health content contributors defended Wikipedia and criticized the study, noting that "Wikipedia is not about truth, but about verifiability." That is, the Wikipedians contended that since the mission of Wikipedia is to reflect what mainstream sources (such as UK's National Institute of Health Care Excellence) say about any given topic, Wikipedia will be just as inaccurate as those sources. Since Wikipedia's policy is to state these inaccuracies that exist in its sources as though they were true (even when editors know they are not true), Wikipedians feel that pointing out how inaccurate Wikipedia's health articles are completely misses the point of Wikipedia, since "Wikipedia is not about truth, but [instead] about verifiability." Wikipedians also noted that the small sample size may have skewed results (in either direction) and that the study may have understated Wikipedia's level of inaccuracy by not accounting for the important information that Wikipedia articles leave out.

A 2014 study found that when the FDA issues new safety warnings about drugs, in 41% of cases reviewed Wikipedia articles about those drugs were updated to give the new safety information within two weeks. Another 23% of Wikipedia drug articles were updated to give this information within an average of about 40 days, but 36% of articles are not updated with this information within a year. A 2014 comparison between selected drug information from pharmacology textbooks and comparable information on the English-language and German-language Wikipedias found that the accuracy of the drug information on Wikipedia was 99.7%, while the completeness of this information was estimated at 83.8%. It concluded that the drug information in Wikipedia covers most of what is essential for undergraduate pharmacology studies and that it is accurate.

A 2015 study comparing the coverage of the autism-vaccine controversy on several websites found that Wikipedia's articles were broadly pro-vaccine. The study attributed this pro-vaccine stance to "this highly controversial topic attracting committed editors who strictly enforce the requirements for academic references." A 2016 study found that drug information on Wikipedia was less accurate and complete than that on the medical reference site Micromedex. A 2017 study compared the accuracy of Wikipedia articles about the 33 most popular medications with medication guides to the accuracy of their medication guides. The study found that the Wikipedia articles were generally less accurate than were the corresponding medication guides.

A 2024 study comparing the Chinese Baidu Baike and the English Wikipedia on irritable bowel syndrome found that Wikipedia "provides more reliable, higher quality, and more objective" information but noted both are still lacking in quality.

=== Readability ===
In 2012, Wikipedia's articles on depression and schizophrenia were compared to coverage in Encyclopædia Britannica and a psychiatry textbook and evaluated for their accuracy, up-to-dateness, breadth of coverage, referencing, and readability. Wikipedia was ranked highly across all categories except for readability.

A 2013 review of nephrology content on Wikipedia found it to be "a comprehensive and fairly reliable medical resource for nephrology patients that is written at a college reading level".

A 2014 study found that Wikipedia's article on Parkinson's disease had a Flesch reading ease score of 30.31, meaning that it was difficult to read.

The readability of Wikipedia's articles on epilepsy was evaluated and found to be low, indicating that they were difficult to read. Another study found that Wikipedia's information about neurological diseases was significantly more difficult to read than the information in the American Academy of Neurology's patient brochures, the Mayo Clinic's website, or MedlinePlus. Another 2015 study, this one authored by Samy Azer, reported that Wikipedia should not be used to learn about concepts related to pulmonology students. Another 2015 study by Azer found that Wikipedia entries about cardiovascular diseases were "not aimed at a medical audience" and were mainly inaccurate due to errors of omission.

A 2016 study found that Wikipedia information about common internal medicine diagnoses was written at a higher grade level than any of the four other sites studied (NIH, WebMD, Mayo Clinic, and "diagnosis-specific websites"). In contrast, another study published the same year found that medical students reading about three unstudied diseases on AccessMedicine and Wikipedia experienced less mental effort than did readers of the same diseases on UpToDate.

A 2017 study evaluating 134 Wikipedia articles on autoimmune diseases found that they were very difficult to read and required at least a university graduate reading level. The study's authors were concerned by Wikipedia's low readability, as people with autoimmune disorders often use Wikipedia to research their condition.

A 2018 study evaluating 55 Wikipedia articles on neurosurgical topics found that they were significantly more difficult to read than the American Association of Neurological Surgeons's patient information articles, although both Wikipedia's articles and the AANS articles required a college reading level.

== Other views ==
Wikipedia co-founder Jimmy Wales has said that lack of health information increases preventable deaths in emerging markets and that health information from Wikipedia can improve community health. Wales presented the Wikipedia Zero project as a channel for delivering health information into places where people have difficulty accessing online information.

As a result of public interest in the 2014 Ebola virus epidemic in West Africa, Wikipedia became a popular source of information on Ebola. Doctors who were Wikipedia contributors said that Wikipedia's quality made it useful.

=== Alternative medicine ===
People who promote alternative medicine have complained that Wikipedia negatively portrays holistic health treatments including energy medicine, Emotional Freedom Techniques, Thought Field Therapy and Tapas Acupressure Technique. In response, Wales has stated, "If you can get your work published in respectable scientific journals – that is to say, if you can produce evidence through replicable scientific experiments, then Wikipedia will cover it appropriately." Similar concerns have been raised regarding its coverage of homeopathy.

== Usage ==
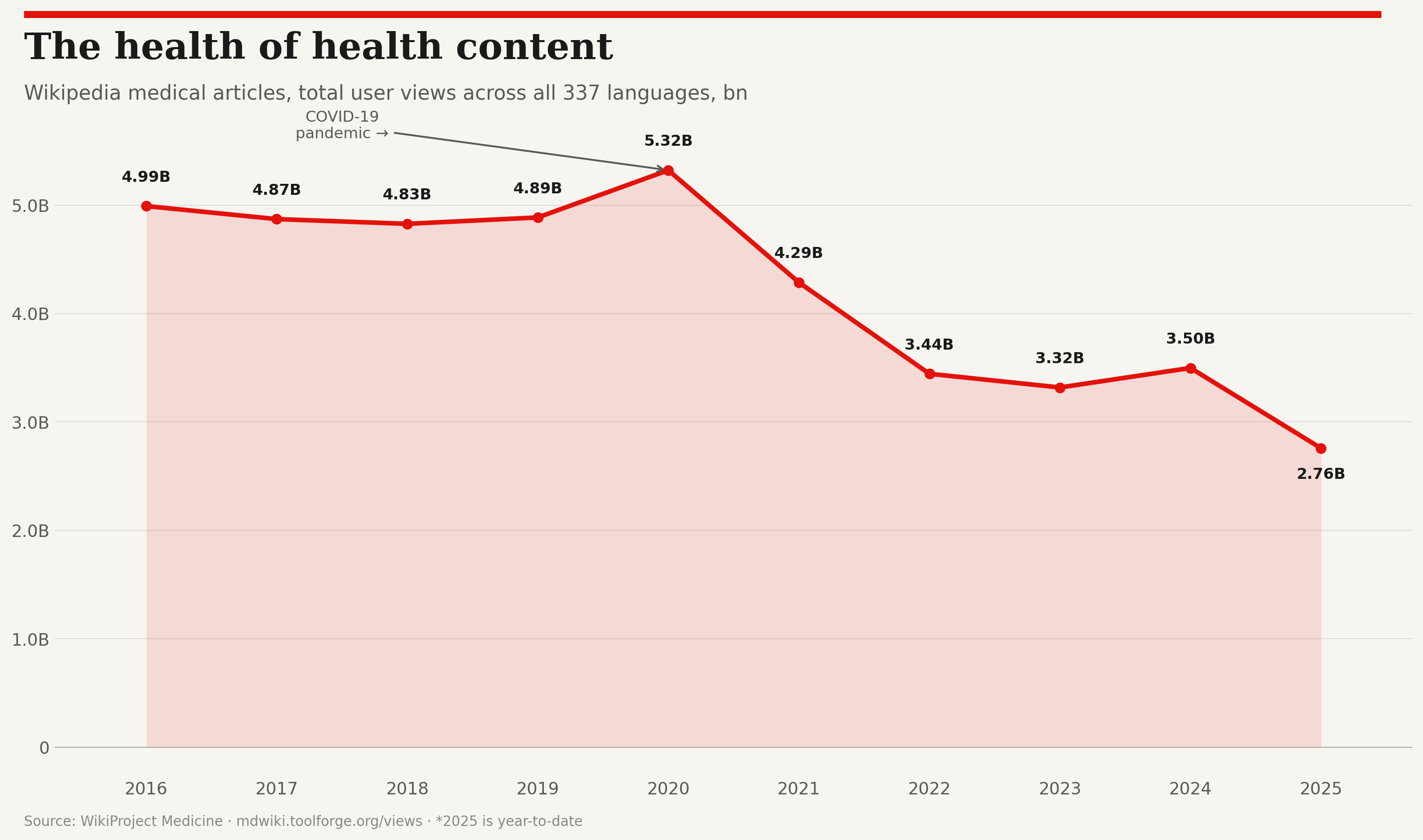
User pageviews for medical articles on Wikipedia across 337 languages

The majority of people in the United States use the internet as a source of health information. The third most common activity for information seeking online is looking up health or medical information. One 2013 study suggested that 22% of healthcare searches online direct users to Wikipedia.

Wikipedia was described in 2014 in a report published by IMS Institute for Healthcare Informatics as "the leading single source" of healthcare information for patients and healthcare professionals. According to the same report, 50% of U.S. physicians that go online for professional purposes are using Wikipedia to access information. These facts were referenced on page 17 from the same research report published by IMS Institute for Healthcare Informatics on "Engaging Patients Through Social Media," and were recirculated further in popular media outlets and peer-reviewed articles. The IMS report provides a citation to an undated research report in "Taking the Pulse" by Manhattan Research, which is unavailable using most library research databases

In July 2014, Wikipedia's medical content in all languages was viewed more often than any other popular healthcare website, including the NIH, WebMD, Mayo Clinic, NHS, WHO, and UpToDate. Some doctors have described their use of Wikipedia as a "guilty secret".

=== General public ===
A 2015 study compared the popularity of Wikipedia's articles on ten of the most common neurological disorders over a 90-day period from April 2014 to July 2014; it found that there was no relationship between the incidence or prevalence of a neurological disorder and the number of page views it received. For example, Wikipedia's article on multiple sclerosis was far more popular than its articles on more common disorders like migraine, epilepsy, or stroke. The authors theorized that this might be due to the increasing prevalence of MRI scans, which has led to an increase in incidental findings of white matter lesions. Although most of these lesions have nothing to do with multiple sclerosis, they may lead patients, relatives, and even physicians to perform Internet searches on "multiple sclerosis", which may lead them to the Wikipedia article.

=== Medical students ===
Wikipedia's health information has been described as "transforming how our next doctors learn medicine". Various commentators in health education have said that Wikipedia is popular and convenient for medical students.

A 2013 study done at a single Australian medical school showed that 97% of students used Wikipedia to study medicine, with the most common reasons being ease of access and ease of understanding. There was no relationship between a student's year in medical school and his or her use of Wikipedia, but students further along in medical school were less likely to use Wikipedia as their first resource, only resource, or most common resource; they were also more likely to perceive Wikipedia as unreliable.

In 2013, UCSF School of Medicine began to offer fourth-year medical students a month-long elective centered around improving Wikipedia's health-related articles. Between 2013 and 2015, 43 students took part in the course and chose a single health-related article to work on. A study of their contributions by UCSF faculty found that the students expanded their articles, added higher-quality sources, removed lower-quality sources, and improved readability. The study's authors argued that medical schools should encourage students to contribute to Wikipedia, both to improve the quality of its content and to enable students to become better health care educators.

A 2013 study of a particular group of veterinary students found that the majority of these students sought and found medical information on Wikipedia.

A 2015 study of five European medical schools found that students who used Wikipedia for general information were more likely to use it to look up medical information. 16% of students used Wikipedia often for general information, 60% sometimes, and 24% rarely. 12% of students used Wikipedia often for medical information, 55% sometimes, and 33% rarely. Almost all of the students (97%) found inaccurate information on Wikipedia at least once, but less than 20% of them corrected it.

A 2015 study of medical students at Dalhousie University in Nova Scotia, Canada, found that they ranked Google and Wikipedia highly for their accessibility, understandability, and usefulness but ranked PubMed higher for accuracy and trustworthiness.

A 2017 study of online resource use by first-year medical students at Melbourne Medical School found that they used the school's online learning platform most often (daily) and used Google and Wikipedia slightly less often (approximately daily). The students considered the learning platform to be most useful, followed by Google and Wikipedia, which they considered slightly less useful than the learning platform but significantly more useful than Facebook or Google Scholar. They also considered the learning platform to be the most reliable and considered Google and Wikipedia to be significantly less reliable, although they frequently used both websites as a starting point for finding information.

A 2017 study of resources used by medical students during their general surgery clerkship at the University of Florida College of Medicine found that review books were the most commonly used type of study resource, followed by the Internet. Wikipedia was the third-most commonly used resource and the most commonly used Internet resource. The study found no correlation between the type of resource used and students' performance on the NBME surgery subject exam.

=== Residents ===
A 2009 study of Internet use by 35 junior doctors in the United Kingdom found that 80% of them used Google and 70% of them used Wikipedia to look up medical information at least once a week, while only 30% used PubMed. Google and Wikipedia were primarily used for background reading, while PubMed and other "best evidence" websites were used to answer specific questions for clinical decision-making.

A 2015 survey of psychiatry residents at Harvard Medical School found that they used online resources twice as often as they used printed resources. The three most commonly used resources were UpToDate, PubMed, and Wikipedia. UpToDate was the most used resource and was considered to be the most trustworthy, while PubMed was the second most used resource and was highly rated as a source of personal learning. Wikipedia was the third most used resource and received the highest ranking for ease of use; however, it was considered the least trustworthy.

=== Physicians and other health professionals ===
A 2013 study of 500 European physicians, most of whom were from Austria and Switzerland, found that general search engines like Google were the most popular type of online medical resource, followed by medical research databases like PubMed, followed in third by Wikipedia. 56% of physicians in training (residents) reported using Wikipedia, versus only 37% of physicians who had already completed their training.

A 2014 study of 259 health professionals in Spain found that while 53% of them used the Spanish Wikipedia to look up medical information during work, only 3% of them considered it reliable and only 16% recommended it to their patients. Only 16% had ever edited a Wikipedia article; the most common reasons for not doing were that they did not consider themselves an expert (51%), they preferred to blog or publish peer-reviewed articles (21%), and they were concerned that someone would undo any contributions they made (17%).

=== Researchers ===
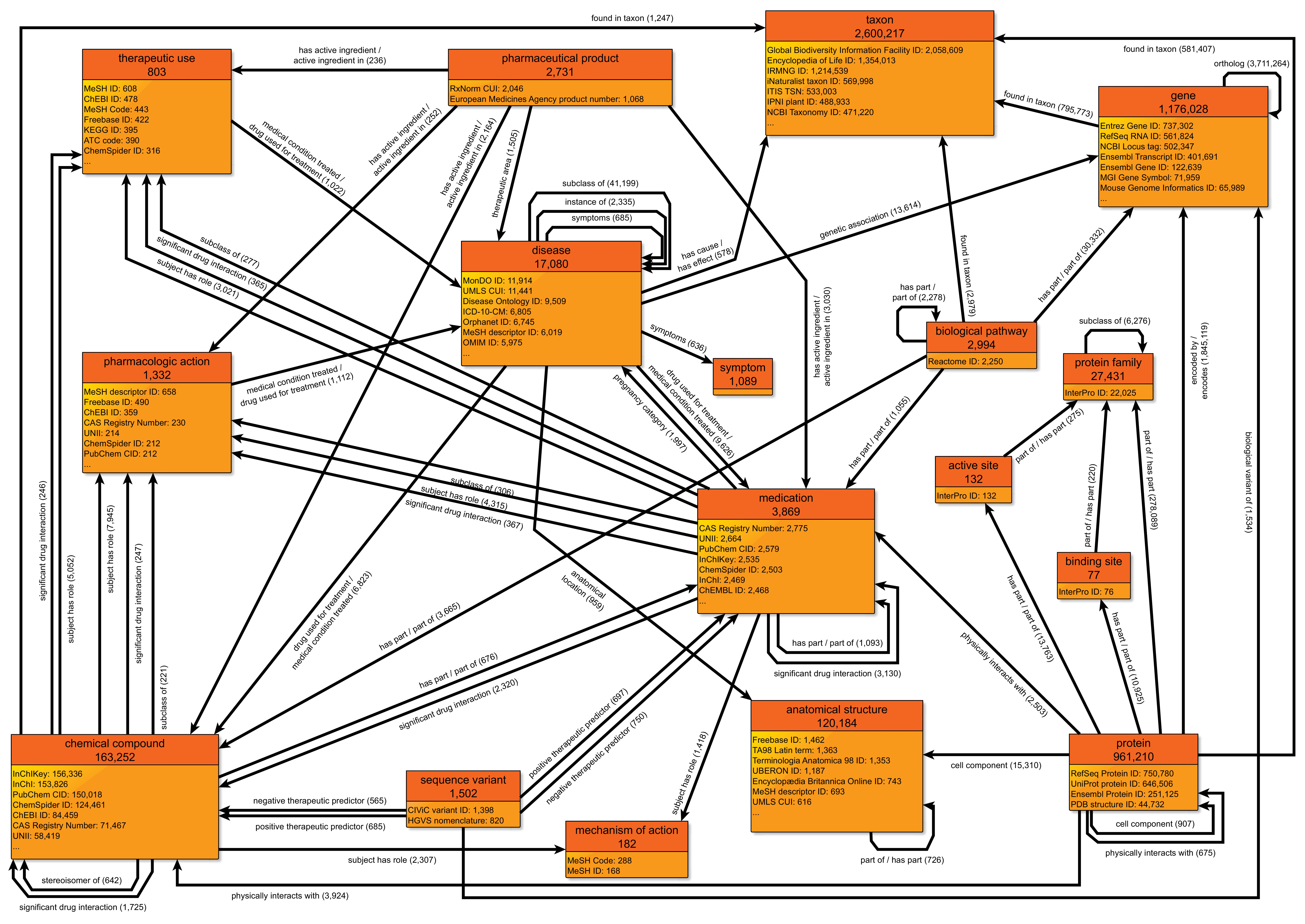
An ontology of Wikidata medical information

Wikipedia and Wikidata are interconnected projects within the Wikimedia ecosystem. Wikidata contains structured data of medical information which is useful in itself, and which also informs information in Wikipedia. The act of putting medical information into the Wikimedia ecosystem changes it in various ways, including making it more accessible, staging it for remixing, and interacting with other information in the Wikimedia platform.

=== Academic citations ===
Wikipedia has been inappropriately cited as an authoritative source in many health science journals.

=== Impact on psychological tests ===
In 2009 a doctor and Wikipedia editor, James Heilman, incorporated public domain images of the Rorschach test into Wikipedia. Psychologists complained that the increased public exposure to these tests devalued their clinical utility, and that public health was harmed as a result.

== Nature of contributors ==
A 2014 interview study found that around half of the editors of health-related content on the English-language Wikipedia are health care professionals, while the other half includes some medical students. An author of this study wrote that this provides "reassurance about the reliability of the website". The study also found that the "core editor community", who actively monitor and edit most health-related articles on the English-language Wikipedia, numbered around 300 people. The study found that people who contribute on these topics do so for a variety of reasons, including a desire to better learn the subjects themselves, and a sense of both responsibility and enjoyment in improving others' access to health information.

A 2016 study found that Wikipedia editors who contributed to articles on designer drugs were most likely to also contribute to articles on illegal drugs and pharmaceutical drugs, implying that they have a background in pharmacology. They were also more likely to contribute to articles on neurological disorders, psychiatric disorders, other diseases, and cell biology; they were least likely to edit articles about popular culture topics or history.

== Traffic statistics in health monitoring ==
Just as Google Flu Trends was able to correlate searches for flu to local outbreaks of flu, page views of Wikipedia articles on flu-related topics have been found to increase in populations experiencing the spread of flu, and of other diseases such as dengue fever and tuberculosis.

== Projects to improve health information on Wikipedia ==
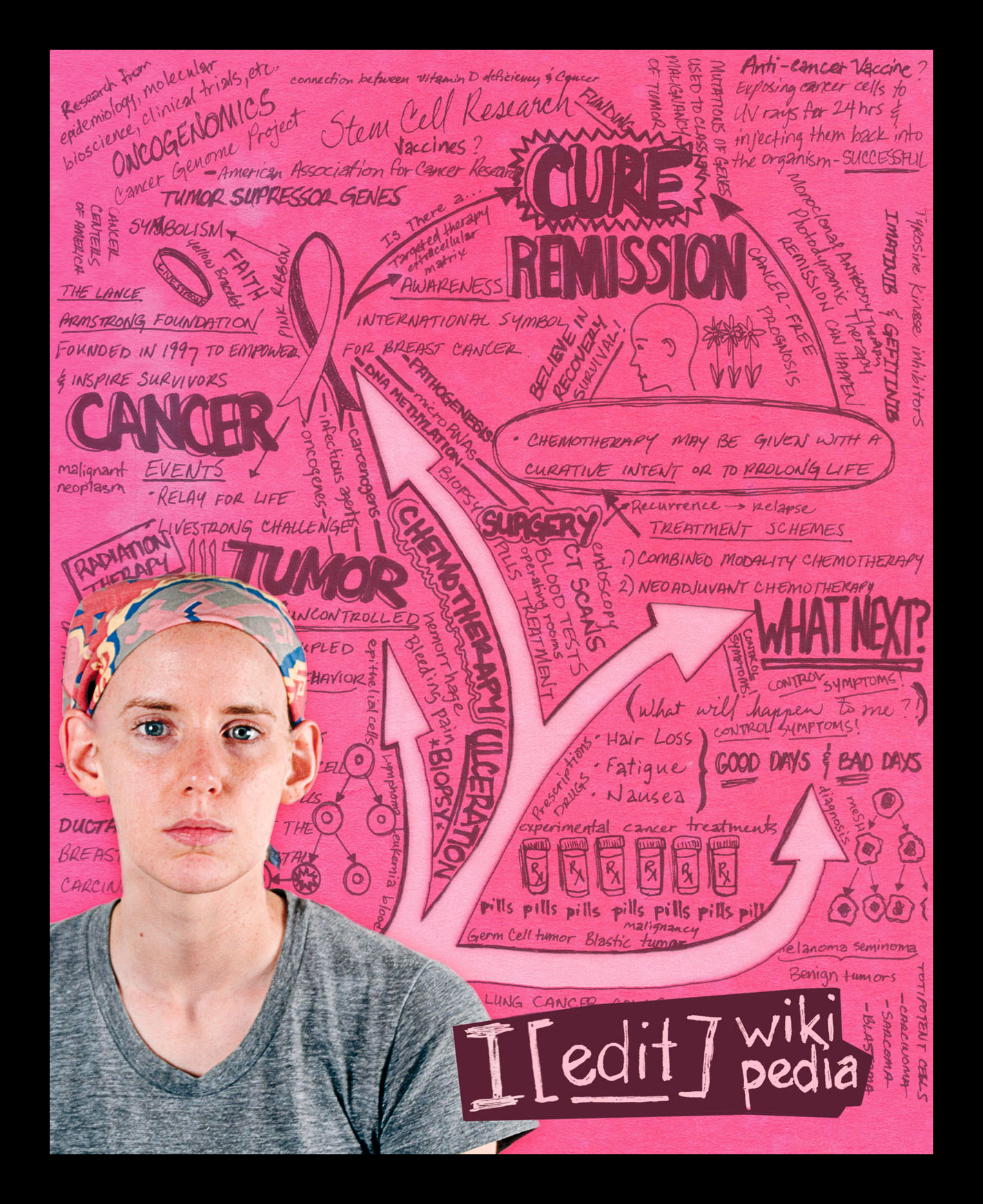
Magazine ad for a Wikipedia campaign

In 2009 the National Institutes of Health attempted a pilot project for integrating health information into Wikipedia.

In 2011, it was reported that Cancer Research UK had started a program whereby some of its staff would edit Wikipedia's cancer-related articles.

The International League Against Epilepsy has an ongoing project called Wikipedia Epilepsy Project to enhance the quality and knowledge about epilepsy.

Health organisations like NIOSH, NIHR and Cochrane also started employing Wikimedians in residence to coordinate their contributions to Wikipedia.

The University of California, San Francisco has a program for encouraging students to contribute health content to Wikipedia.

== See also ==
- Health information on the Internet
- List of medical wikis
- Reliability of Wikipedia
- Science information on Wikipedia
