= List of Ghost Hound episodes =

This is a list of episodes of the Japanese anime series Ghost Hound. It began airing October 18, 2007, and spanned twenty-two episodes. Several episode titles contain references to various physiological, biological, neurological, philosophical and science fiction terms.

== Episode list ==
No.	Title	Original air date
1	"Lucid Dream"; Transliteration: "Meisekimu" (Japanese: 明晰夢)	October 18, 2007
Tarō Komori tries to find the connection between his dreams and the traumatic event involving him and his older sister, Mizuka Komori, eleven years ago. He receives a new therapist, and the transfer student Masayuki Nakajima begins to move in on him and Makoto Ōgami.
2	"E.M.D.R.: Eye Movement Desensitization and Reprocessing"; Transliteration: "Gankyū Undō ni Yoru Datsukansa to Saishori" (Japanese: 眼球運動による脱感作と再処理)	October 25, 2007
Masayuki reveals the timeline of the kidnapping incident and theorises that there is a connection between the case and Makoto's father's death. Tarō begins E.M.D.R. therapy, which dredges up memories previously hidden.
3	"Phobia Exposure"; Transliteration: "Kyōfushō Bakuro" (Japanese: 恐怖症曝露)	November 1, 2007
Masayuki invites Tarō and Makoto to travel to the old hospital, where Tarō and Mizuka were hidden when they were kidnapped. The journey reveals many things about the three boys' pasts.
4	"Altered States of Consciousness"; Transliteration: "Hensei Ishiki" (Japanese: 変成意識)	November 8, 2007
The three boys continue to explore the hospital, and more history regarding Masayuki and Makoto is revealed. Eventually, the three discover that there is something very unnatural about the hospital.
5	"O.B.E.: Out of Body Experience"; Transliteration: "Taigai Ridatsu Taiken" (Japanese: 体外離脱体験)	November 15, 2007
The three learn more about astral projection and the hidden realm from Makoto, due to his knowledge from the religious group his family owns. Tarō's parents, Ryōya and Miki Komori, talk with Atsushi Hirata, his psychologist, and the three boys later meet each other in the hidden realm again.
6	"Brain Homunculus"; Transliteration: "Nō no Naka no Homunkurusu" (Japanese: 脳の中のホムンクルス)	November 22, 2007
Makoto looks through his father's desk and remembers the past, and Masayuki attempts his own version of phobia exposure. After meeting the old traveler Genma Saruta in his O.B.E, Tarō tries to find him the next day, and suffers a sudden narcoleptic attack on his way back.
7	"L.T.P.: Long Term Potentiation"; Transliteration: "Shinapusu Kairo o Henka sase, Sore o Iji suru Nōryoku = Ningen no Nō ni Okeru Chōki Kioku no Shōtai" (Japanese: シナプス回路を変化させ、それを維持する能力=人間の脳に於ける長期記憶の正体)	November 29, 2007
Tarō is in hospital after hitting his head on the steps near the shrine. He is visited by Masayuki and the two receive an extensive information session on the brain from Hirata and Reika Ōtori. Makoto confronts Motoi Yazaki about his parents.
8	"Revolution of Limbic System"; Transliteration: "Nō no Hentōtai o Chūshin to Suru Kioku, Jōdō o Tsukasadoru Dainō Hen'enkei -- Sono Kakumei" (Japanese: 脳の扁桃体を中心とする記憶·情動を司る大脳辺縁系――その革命)	December 6, 2007
Hirata discusses the potential reasons for Tarō's memory loss. Tarō encounters the ghost of an extinct animal and enters a dimensional rift. Hirata goes through a supernatural experience.
9	"Existential Ghosts"; Transliteration: "Jitsuzon Shugiteki naru Shinrei" (Japanese: 実存主義的なる神霊)	December 13, 2007
Four teenagers are attacked by a black humanoid ghost near the old abandoned building where the kidnapper was run over and killed. Later, the three protagonists investigate the area in their state of O.B.E., and the spirit turns its sights on them.
10	"Affordance/T.F.T.:Thought Field Therapy"; Transliteration: "Afōdansu [Kankyō ga Seibutsu ni Teikyō Suru Mono]/Shikōba Ryōhō" (Japanese: アフォーダンス【環境が生物に提供するもの】/思考場療法)	December 20, 2007
Masayuki helps Michio Hoshino who is bullied. Later on he mentions the concept of O.B.E. to Michio. Tarō and Masayuki start asking questions about the mountain. Meanwhile, Makoto figures out that he can transform in his state of O.B.E., after witnessing Tarō and Masayuki doing the same during their previous investigation. The shinto priest Takahito Komagusu meets Saruta who hints that there are two other people besides him on the mountain.
11	"Syntax Error"; Transliteration: "Ronriteki Tōjiron ni Okeru Ayamachi/Puroguramu Bagu" (Japanese: 論理的統辞論に於ける過ち/プログラム·バグ)	January 10, 2008
A body was found floating in the dam. The so-called curse was brought up and the three protagonists learn about the story of the first four high schoolers who went to the abandoned hospital.
12	"Homeostasis Synchronization"; Transliteration: "Kōjōsei Iji Kinō Dōchō Kōka" (Japanese: 恒常性維持機能同調効果)	January 24, 2008
Takahito is called to Miyako Komagusu's school. Later, he meets and starts consulting with Hirata about Miyako. Hirata is starting to suspect that the area has something to do with the supernatural occurrences. Meanwhile Tarō sees Miyako being possessed firsthand.
13	"For the Snark was a Boojum, you see." Transliteration: "Sō, Sono Sunāku wa Būjamu datta" (Japanese: そう、そのスナークはブージャムだった)	January 31, 2008
Tarō had a long O.B.E. sequence where he sees Miyako in bed with fever and meets Masato Kaibara as the Snark in the hidden realm. He goes with Masayuki, Makoto, and Michio to her house. When he mentions what Miyako said in her possessed state, Takahito becomes afraid and tells them to leave. At the bottom of the shrine steps is Noriko Kabata, the handmaiden of Himeko Ōgami, Makoto's grandmother.
14	"Emergence Matrix"; Transliteration: "Sōhatsu Kiban" (Japanese: 創発基盤)	February 7, 2008
Takahito takes Miyako to Hirata for therapy, and Miyako later goes into her possessed state. On the way back to the shrine, Tarō, Masayuki, Makoto, Michio, Miyako, and Takahito all meet Kabata. She grabs Miyako and says that Miyako is the next miko. Miyako then goes into a trance again, and Makoto furiously curses Himeko. He runs back to his house and finds Himeko dead.
15	"Toward an Abandoned City"; Transliteration: "Haishi e" (Japanese: 廃市へ)	February 14, 2008
Makoto and Tarō go to Kurata for various reasons. They visit Kei Yakushi's house, and Tarō apologizes to Kei for messing up the yeast brewery process. Masayuki and Michio catch the reporter Seiichi Suzuki who has been snooping around. He was sent to investigate the biotech research facility for industry leaks. While listening to Tarō's recorded dreams, Hirata goes through Tarō's experience in the hospital.
16	"Hopeful Monster"; Transliteration: "Kibōteki na Kaibutsu" (Japanese: 希望的な怪物)	February 21, 2008
At Kurata, Tarō and Makoto meet Sanae Ōgami, Makoto's mother, and Makoto makes a failed attempt at killing her. Tarō recognizes Sanae's lover, Masato, as the Snark. Meanwhile, Masayuki discovers spirits in the biotech research facility in an O.B.E. He sees his dad speaking with Reika about his research but then he is suddenly attacked by some spirit monsters, known as hopeful monsters, by Reika's biotech laboratory assistant.
17	"Implicate Order"; Transliteration: "Naizai Chitsujo" (Japanese: 内在秩序)	February 28, 2008
Saruta notices that the spirits are afraid of something. He warns Takahito that there people out for Miyako's powers. Tarō tells Miyako that he thinks that she is the reincarnation of Mizuka, to which really upsets Miyako. Makoto still has not returned. Suzuki notices there is a suspicious group of men around the Ōgami household.
18	"Holographic Paradigm"; Transliteration: "Mizube no Ryōshi Jūryoku Riron" (Japanese: 水辺の量子重力理論)	March 6, 2008
Suzuki talks with his superior about the links with the Ōgami religious group, child kidnappings, and illegal organ donations with the biotech research facility. Miyako meets Kabata, and Takahito was found bleeding on the shrine steps. The truth about the death of Makoto's father and the kidnapping of Tarō comes to light.
19	"Negentropy"; Transliteration: "Kasosei Jikan" (Japanese: 可塑性時間)	March 13, 2008
Makoto rescues Sanae from a house fire, however Masato dies in the process. She had just woken up from a coma but her memory has regressed. Takahito is in an ICU, but Miyako does not recognize Masayuki and Tarō. Kei reminisces about Masato and how she loved him from afar. Makoto reconciles with his mother.
20	"Shaman's District"; Transliteration: "Shāman no Ryōiki" (Japanese: シャーマンの領域)	March 20, 2008
The Ōgami religious group is allowed to have care of Miyako. Biotech research has been published ahead in other countries ahead of the research of Yasuhiro Nakajima, Masayuki's father. Makoto talks with Suzuki and finds links with the Ōgami religious group with an underground group. Tarō goes to the hidden realm to find Yasuhiro. Reika's assistant releases mutants, used from Yasuhiro's research, into the dam. People are coming down from the mountain to the Ōgami house.
21	"Stochastic Resonance"; Transliteration: "Kakuritsu Kyōmei" (Japanese: 確率共鳴)	March 27, 2008
Makoto is staying at Tarō's house and Ryōya gives Makoto the guitar that was originally owned by Makoto's father. Takahito wakes up, but he was threatened. Hirata and Reika meet up with Tarō, Masayuki, Makoto, Michio, Suzuki, and Saruta at the shrine. Tarō vows to save Miyako.
22	"Passage"; Transliteration: "Dōtei/Anmokuchi no Jigen" (Japanese: 道程/暗黙知の次元)	April 3, 2008
Makoto and Masayuki help devise a plan to allow Tarō to enter the shrine where Miyako is being held as the leader of the Ōgami religious group. Only women and girls are allowed to enter, so the boys plan on dressing Tarō up as a young female so that he may enter and rescue Miyako. Hirata and Reika also assist in carrying out the plan.
