= Paul McKenna =

British hypnotist and TV personality (born 1963)

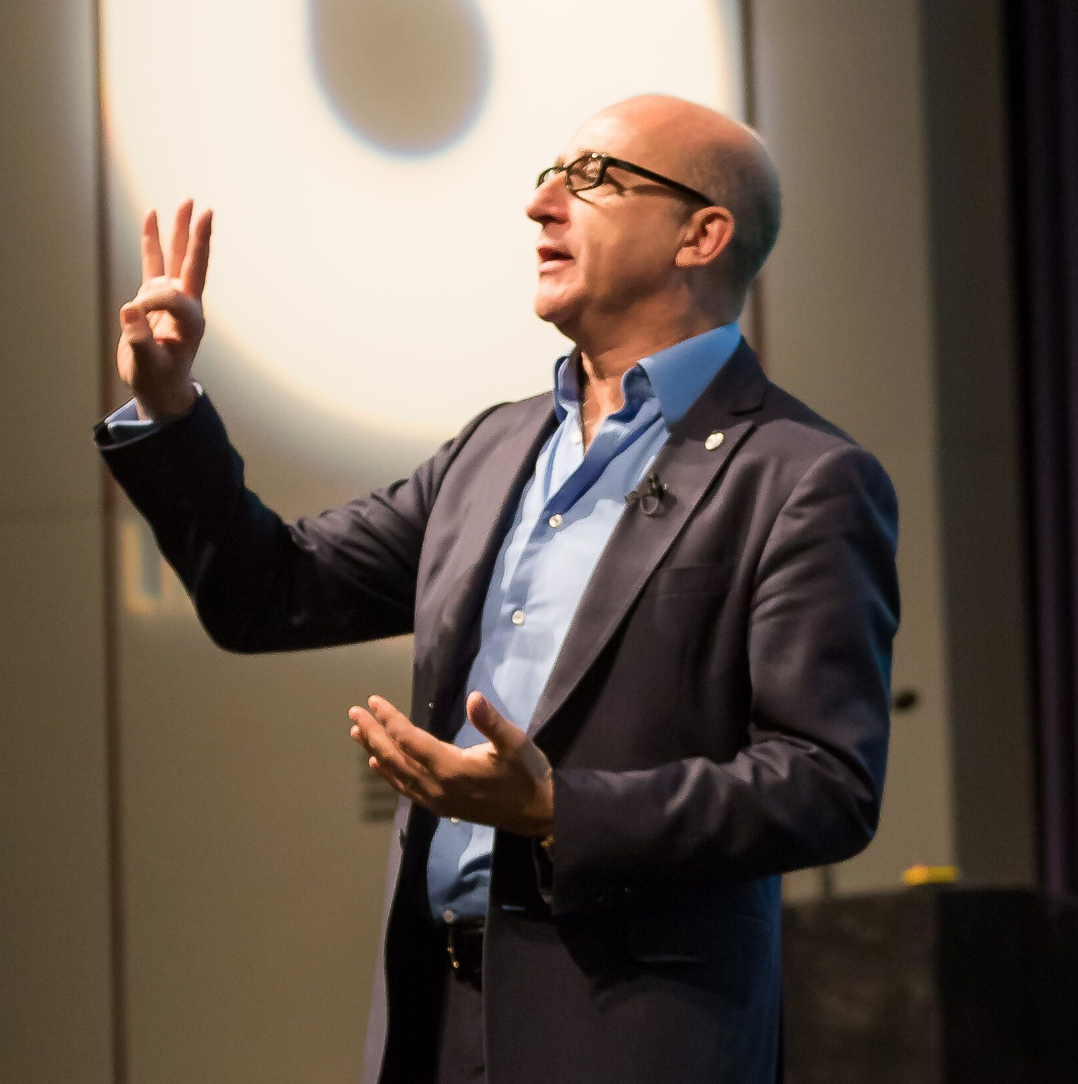
- Born: 8 November 1963 (age 62); Enfield, London, England
- Occupations: Hypnotist, writer, television & radio broadcaster, behaviourist
- Known for: Hypnosis
- Website: paulmckenna.com

Paul McKenna (born 8 November 1963) is a British hypnotist, behavioural scientist, television and radio broadcaster, and author of self-help books.

McKenna has hosted self-improvement television shows and presents seminars in hypnosis, neuro-linguistic programming, weight loss, motivation, the Zen meditation Big Mind, Amygdala Depotentiation Therapy (ADT) and the Havening techniques.

== Early life ==
McKenna was born in Enfield, London to a builder and a home economics teacher. He attended St Ignatius College. He was routinely bullied by his teachers for his dyslexia.

== Career ==
=== Radio and television ===
McKenna started working in Radio Top Shop aged 16, and went on to present for stations including Radio Caroline and Capital London.

After two years presenting at BBC Radio 1 in the early 1990s, McKenna hosted a number of TV programmes, including The Hypnotic World of Paul McKenna (1993–97), The Paranormal World of Paul McKenna (1996–97) and Hyp the Streets (1999). He won the Television and Radio Industries Club Award for Best TV Newcomer in 1994. During this time, he continued his studies of hypnosis and neuro-linguistic programming (NLP) with Richard Bandler, the co-creator of NLP.

McKenna appeared on series 4, episode 2 of Top Gear to hypnotise presenter Richard Hammond in 2004. In 2005, McKenna hosted the television show I Can Change Your Life on Sky One, which combined hypnotism with therapy as he tried to cure participants of both psychological and physical ailments. In October 2009 he was a guest on Private Passions, a music discussion programme on BBC Radio 3.

From February 2014 to September 2015, McKenna hosted a talk show called McKenna, broadcast on Hulu and featuring "non-journalistic" interviews with Simon Cowell, Ryan Seacrest, Roger Moore, Rachael Ray, Tony Robbins and Richard Dawkins.

=== Hypnosis ===
He became interested in hypnotism as a result of a guest who appeared on his show. He was taught hypnosis by Richard Bandler, with whom he continued to work closely for many years. While working at Capital Radio, McKenna began experimenting with small hypnosis shows in pubs and clubs, UK military bases and university events. He then starred in a regular Sunday night show at the Duke of York's Theatre, which was owned at the time by Capital Radio. The success of those shows led to his playing other theatres across the UK, Ireland, the Netherlands, the US, Australia and Hong Kong.

=== Research ===
In 1996, McKenna was granted a PhD from LaSalle University in Louisiana. It was legally licensed by the state, but it falsely claimed to be an accredited institution. The school exempted McKenna from coursework based on his prior work, and his dissertation was producing a series of self-help tapes that eventually became a book, Change Your Life in Seven Days.

Discovery of this lack of accreditation prompted McKenna to obtain another PhD in 2003 from Revans University, an online institution based out of the Republic of Vanuatu. Revans’s accredited status was revoked in 2005 when it was discovered that students did not require the normal level of dedicated research in order to earn their degrees, and instead a legal loophole was being exploited.

The title of his thesis was "The Effects of Fixed Action Patterns and Neuro-Linguistic Programming in Determining Outcomes in Human Behaviour".

McKenna specialises in post-traumatic stress disorder, severe trauma, pain control and emotional overwhelm.

=== Self-help ===
McKenna is the author of self-help and personal development books.

He has practised one-to-one hypnotherapy on celebrity clients. He helped Daryl Hannah cope with stage fright when she starred in The Seven Year Itch. According to one of McKenna's books, Rob Brydon claimed that McKenna helped alleviate his fear of flying, Stephen Fry advocated for McKenna's weight loss strategies and David Walliams used McKenna to help with his swim across the English Channel.

McKenna focuses on teaching people how to "deprogramme" their sugar cravings, claiming "sugar is the most dangerous drug in the world".

== Libel lawsuits ==
=== Daily Star & National Enquirer ===
In 1999, McKenna successfully sued both the Daily Star and National Enquirer for libel after they published articles that alleged he had damaged the mental health of a man whom he hypnotised in one of his shows. Both lawsuits resulted in six-figure settlements. The man involved had sued McKenna in a previous trial, but the judge dismissed the suit after concluding that there was no evidence that McKenna's stage hypnosis posed any risk to those taking part.

=== Daily Mirror ===
In 2006, McKenna successfully sued the Daily Mirror for libel over claims made by former TV critic Victor Lewis-Smith that McKenna's qualification from LaSalle was a purchased "bogus degree" bought with the intention of deliberately defrauding the public. McKenna won the case, and the newspaper was ordered to pay £75,000 in costs. The judge, Justice Eady, said that while the scholarly characterisation of the degree was "another matter", McKenna did not believe the degree was "bogus or that he [had] misled anyone in allowing himself to be referred to as a PhD."

== Published works ==
- Success for Life: The Secret to Achieving Your True Potential, Headline Publishing Group: 2024 ISBN 9781802797886
- Freedom from Anxiety, Welbeck: 2023 ISBN 978-1-80279-550-9
- Control Stress, Hay House 2017 ISBN 978-1-401-94913-6
- Supercharge Your Intelligence Today!, Hay House 2017 ISBN 978-1-401-94897-9
- Get Control of Sugar Now!, Hay House 2017 ISBN 978-0-593-07568-5
- The 3 Things That Will Change Your Destiny Today!, Hay House 2016 ISBN 978-1-401-94909-9
- Freedom from Emotional Eating, Hay House 2015 ISBN 978-1-401-94895-5
- Instant Influence and Charisma, Transworld 2015 ISBN 978-0-593-07566-1
- Hypnotic Gastric Band, Bantam Press 2013 ISBN 978-0-593-07074-1
- I Can Make You Smarter, Bantam Press 2012 ISBN 978-0-593-06405-4
- I Can Make You Happy, Bantam Press: 2011 ISBN 978-0-593-06404-7
- Change Your Life in Seven Days updated version, Bantam Press: 2010 ISBN 978-0-593-06661-4
- I Can Make You Confident, Sterling Publishing: 2010. ISBN 1-4027-6922-9
- I Can Make You Sleep, Bantam Press: 2009 ISBN 1-4027-6574-6
- Control Stress Stop Worrying and Feel Good Now!, Bantam Press: 2009 ISBN 978-0-593-05629-5
- I Can Make You Rich, Bantam Press: 2007 ISBN 0-593-05537-3
- Quit Smoking Today Without Gaining Weight, Bantam Press: 2007 ISBN 0-593-05536-5
- Instant Confidence, Bantam Press: 2006 ISBN 0-593-05535-7
- I Can Make You Thin 90-Day Success Journal, Bantam Press: 2006 ISBN 978-0-593-05056-9
- I Can Make You Thin, Bantam Press: 2005 ISBN 0-593-05054-1
- Change Your Life in Seven Days, 2005 ISBN 0-593-05053-3
- How to Mend Your Broken Heart, (with Hugh Willbourn) Bantam Press: 2003 ISBN 0-593-05055-X
- The Power to Influence, Nightingale-Conant: 1998 ISBN 1-905453-56-6 (audiobook with Michael Breen)
- The Paranormal World of Paul McKenna, Faber and Faber: 1997 ISBN 0-571-19245-9
- Paul McKenna's Hypnotic Secrets, Boxtree: 1995 ISBN 0-7522-0192-1 (with Peter Willis and Clare Staples)
- Hypno Slim, Sunday Books: 1994 ISBN 978-1-898-88501-6
- The Hypnotic World of Paul McKenna, Faber and Faber: 1994 ISBN 0-571-16802-7
