= Psychosensory therapy =

Psychotherapy using sensory stimuli

Psychosensory therapy is a psychotherapeutic modality that uses sensory stimuli (i.e., touch, sight, sound, taste, & smell) to affect psychological health, as well as a broader group of techniques involving the application of sensory inputs to treat dysfunctional behaviors, mood disturbances, troubling thought patterns, and pain conditions. Psychosensory therapy has its roots in traditional Chinese medicine and so-called energy psychology. Important figures in psychosensory therapy development include chiropractor George Goodheart, psychiatrist John Diamond, clinical psychologist Roger Callahan, and Ronald Ruden.

Common techniques used in psychosensory therapy include havening, emotional freedom techniques, Callahan's thought field therapy, and eye movement desensitization and reprocessing.

These techniques, in addition to others, according to both American Psychiatric Association and Stapleton and colleagues, are effective for treating generalized anxiety disorder, clinical depression, and post-traumatic stress disorder.

== Background and influences ==
The origin of psychosensory therapy is rooted in applied kinesiology, traditional Chinese medicine, and the field of energy psychology. The term was first used by Ruden, which he described as altering feelings, thoughts, and behaviors through utilizing sensory input. Ruden argues that psychosensory therapy should be thought of as a third pillar to treatment, in addition to psychotherapy and psychopharmacology. Regarding traditional Chinese medicine, acupuncture was used as a way to cure disease through different energy meridians in our body. According to Chang, the idea with TCM is that health is harmony, and disease is a lack of harmony, and one way of achieving harmony is through interaction of rhythms. Beginning in the field of Applied Kinesiology, where chiropractor George Goodheart (in the 1960s and 1970s) began exploring clinical observations through muscle testing (i.e., technique where tester monitors subtle changes in muscle tone as an indicator of sickness and health within the body). Goodheart also developed the technique “tapping” which he found helped his patients feel relief from trauma and stress, and is currently used today. According to Mollon, around the same time, John Diamond, a psychiatrist, joined Goodheart's team and began exploring the implications to psychological disorders and emotional conditions. What the team found was that when an individual thinks of something upsetting or lies, the muscle test will be slightly weaker. The team also found that by stimulating specific acupuncture meridians and asking the individual to say certain emotional affirmations, that would result in an ameliorated weakened muscle test and the individual would experience relief from the distress that just occurred. Therefore, Diamond found connections between acupuncture meridians, words, and emotions, and thus found a way of rapidly ameliorating the distress.

Roger Callahan, a clinical psychologist, extended Diamond's work after a client he had been working with, was responding only marginally to cognitive and behavioral forms of treatment for a longstanding phobia of water. According to Mollon, one day in 1979, Callahan performed a muscle test (as Goodheart and Diamond did) and found his client to have a problem in her stomach meridian, so he asked her to tap on the other side of the meridian (her second toe or under the eye), and within a few seconds his client reported the anxiety in her stomach was gone and she ran to the swimming pool with her phobia never returning. Dr. Callahan went on to explore this event further, and with minimal success at the beginning, he eventually discovered that individuals require multiple points to be tapped in a specific sequence, and that varied between individuals. Callahan developed this procedure further and eventually, through trial and error, refined a muscle testing procedure that enabled the tapping sequence to be found, which worked rapidly at relieving distress for his clients. Callahan initially only applied this technique with phobias and anxieties, as his first book was titled “The Five Minute Phobia Cure” but was later found to be helpful with other emotional problems and with PTSD.

Callahan also discovered, through an individual's muscle response, an indication of individual's resistance to recovery. For example, a normal muscle response when an individual says, "I want to get over this issue" is strong, and when an individual says, "I don't want to get over this issue" the normal muscle response is weak. However, some individual's muscles would respond to "I don't want to get over this issue" as strong, and as Callahan suggests, these individuals would not benefit from the tapping method in addition to other treatments. According to Mollon, Callahan called this "a reversal" and claimed it would completely block treatment. Callahan speculated that these reversals would contain hidden motivations and conflicts that result from the body's energy system, and they can be rapidly reduced by Callahan's methods. Callahan called these methods thought field therapy (TFT) because an individual's thought does not only occur in the mind, but also in an energy field within the body that can be accessed through acupuncture and other similar methods. TFT was not based on a theory but more on observations based on the techniques he used. Callahan was mostly the only clinician during the 1980s to use these techniques, but in the 1990s others have started to promote these techniques.

Energy psychology is a form of therapeutic techniques aimed at using our senses (e.g., touch) in combination with psychological exposure and cognitive techniques. The idea is thought to in part be sparked by quantum theory, in that, energy and matter are from the same reality, therefore, all psychological problems involve a dysregulated or imbalanced energy system. These techniques are derived from non-Western systems for spiritual development and healing. Energy psychology is also thought of as "acupuncture without needles" for treating psychological disorders. Energy psychology has roots in applied kinesiology, traditional Chinese medicine, and clinical psychology. For example, TFT involves utilizing imagery and/or thoughts, feelings, and acupuncture as a way of improving symptoms. TFT involves techniques performed while the individual is thinking about his/her problem. These techniques involve activating specific acupuncture points, which then alleviate negative emotions that are associated with the psychological problems.

== Elements ==
Psychosensory therapy can be defined as a form of therapeutic treatment that uses sensory input (i.e. touch, sight, sound, taste, smell) to alter our thoughts, mood, and behavior. The sensory input is often used therapeutically to evoke an extrasensory response—a response not bound to the limits of human senses (beyond the five senses). Sensory input can alter the brain. For instance, one may feel joy when listening to music, hunger when passing a restaurant, and comfort and warmth when massaged.

=== Touch ===
Touch therapy is older than recorded time, dating back to 1800 BC. The mechanism of touch is based on mechanoreceptors embedded in the skin. These mechanoreceptors monitor pressure, heat, perception of pain, and texture. Touch is a form of nonverbal communication that can have an extrasensory effect. The use of touch has been long associated with healing. For instance, acupuncture needling, an ancient practice in traditional Chinese medicine (TCM) and a touch therapeutic technique, deals with the insertion of needles into the skin in order to affect one's mood and perception of pain. Reiki, a Japanese touch technique, deals with movement of hands on the body and is often used for stress reduction. Massage therapy involves kneading different parts of the body with some pressure. This form of touch therapy breaks down tissue tensions, and restores normal lengths to the tendons, thus reducing stress. Massage has been shown to decrease cortisol levels, and cause a rise in dopamine and serotonin.

=== Sight ===
Symmetry and order may produce a calming effect to one's sight. The construction of symmetry can produce a sense of balance, harmony and perfect proportion. Symmetry is usually perceived to be more attractive than asymmetry. For instance, a beautiful symmetrical face can be comforting and pleasing to look toward. Lack of order can evoke confusion. Extensive research has demonstrated that the lack of sunlight can produce disorders such as depression, substance abuse, and suicidal ideation and intent.

=== Sound ===
The Ancient Greeks considered music and sound to penetrate the depths of the soul. Various aspects of music can affect one's emotional state. For instance, the speed, rhythm, and melody are some aspects of music that can affect the human mind and emotions. Early forms of music such as communal chanting was often used in religious settings in order to evoke a feeling of safety and unity within the community. Some researchers consensually agree that music's soothing effect is due to inhibiting other sensory input (taste, sight, etc.), from affecting the senses. Different forms of music can affect one's mood. For instance, seasonal music may make one feel more cheerful, while martial music can make one feel more combative and quarrelsome.

=== Taste ===
Taste can have a sensory impact other than curbing hunger. Sugar is a mind-altering substance that can trigger a serotonin-release and produce a craving for sweet things such as comfort foods. Comfort foods typically have a high-carbohydrate and sugar content. The extrasensory effect of food can cause it to feel like a drug and comforting, which may lead to health concerns such as obesity. These comfort foods may be associated with positive, good feelings such as comfort, home, and safety.

=== Smell ===
Smell is a chemical sense that involves odoriferous molecules as the primary source of information. Smell is the fastest route to the brain's limbic system which governs emotion. Smell impulses are faster than other sensory stimuli such as visual and auditory processing, and thus has a powerful effect on one's emotional state. Aromatherapy, is a smell technique that uses essential oils, extracted from plants for the treatment of physical and emotional health. The essential oils can be ingested or inhaled, or applied topically. Research has shown aromatherapy to produce modest to significant effects. In one study, researchers studied various scents (lavender, lemon, rose) for anti-stress. Results indicated that lemon scents were the best anti-stress aromas for stress situations.

== Interventions ==
According to Ruden there are multiple psychosensory therapy techniques, including havening techniques, emotional freedom techniques (EFT), Callahan technique–thought field therapy (CT-TFT) and eye movement desensitizing and reprocessing (EMDR). Ruden claimed that some psychosensory therapy techniques need continuing maintenance, while others can facilitate permanent change. However, of these psychosensory therapy techniques, only EMDR for posttraumatic stress disorder (PTSD) is recognized as a psychological treatment for the Society of Clinical Psychology Division 12 of the American Psychological Association.

=== Havening techniques ===
Havening therapy is Ruden's approach to treating suffering related to trauma. This technique utilizes sensory inputs, including physical touching between the therapist and patient, to create a safe space for de-encoding traumatic memories. In practice a practitioner might lightly tap and stroke a subject who hums and practices eye movements, in the hope this might alleviate pain.

According to Ruden, touch facilitates an increase in calming chemicals like serotonin, which deactivates specific receptors in the memory bank. Consequently, successful havening can result in permanent change as amygdala-activated emotional responses to the traumatic memory are removed. However, havening has been criticized for a lacking empirical support, and that significantly more research on havening is needed before the practice can be considered evidence based.

=== Emotional freedom techniques ===
Emotional freedom techniques (EFT) utilizes various psychological treatments, like exposure techniques and cognitive techniques in tandem with stimulation of acupuncture points. In place of needles, EFT patients tap acupuncture points on the upper body and face. Reviews of EFT literature suggest that EFT only has moderate empirical support from primarily small or moderate randomized controlled trials. One report of two major reviews of the supportive evidence for EFT gathered over 30 years showed support for EFT to be methodologically weak.

=== Callahan technique–thought field therapy ===
Callahan technique–Thought field therapy (CT-TFT) was introduced by Roger Callahan in his book Five Minute Phobia Cure (Callahan, 1985). Like EFT, CT-TFT utilizes manual stimulation of acupuncture points, utilizing the stimulation while simultaneously focusing on the objects of fear or anxiety. As with havening techniques and EFT, the empirical basis for CT-TFT is a contested issue, as critics state CT-TFT support is methodically weak.

=== Eye movement desensitizing and reprocessing ===
Eye movement desensitization and reprocessing (EMDR) combines traumatic memory processing with eye movement. EMDR hypothesizes that bilateral eye movements information processing and integration, promoting fuller processing of traumatic memories. Unlike havening techniques, EFT, and CT-TFT, EMDR is recognized by the Society of Clinical Psychology Division 12 of the American Psychological Association as psychological treatment for PTSD with strong, albeit controversial research support. Some evidence shows that EMDR is comparably effective to exposure therapies for trauma, suggesting that exposure represents the critical element, and the eye movement component is superfluous.
