= International Expressive Arts Therapy Association =

The International Expressive Arts Therapy Association (IEATA) is a non-profit organization founded in 1994. It aims to encourage the "creative spirit" and supports expressive arts therapists, artists, educators, consultants, and others using integrative, multi-modal arts processes for personal and community growth. IEATA provides a professional guild and an international network through sponsoring bi-annual conferences. It provides a global forum for dialogue, promotes guiding principles for professional practice, and works to increase recognition and use of expressive arts as a tool for psychological, physical and spiritual wellness.

== Memberships ==
IEATA offers two kinds of registration for professional memberships.

- "REAT" - registration is designed for those using the Expressive Arts in psychotherapy.
- "REACE" is a registration designed for expressive arts consultants and educators using the expressive arts in a broad range of approaches in education, organizational development, health fields and more.

== Bibliography ==
- Knill, P. (de), Barba, H., & Fuchs, M. (1995). Minstrels of the Soul: Intermodal Expressive therapy. Canada: Palmerston Press.
- Kossak, M. (2008). "Therapeutic Attunement: A Transpersonal View of Expressive Arts Therapy.". The Arts in Psychotherapy. 36(1), 13–18.
- Levine, S., and Levine, E. (Eds.) (1999). Foundations of expressive arts therapy: Theoretical and clinical perspectives. London and Philadelphia: Jessica Kingsley Publishers.
- Levine, S. (1992). Poesis is the language of psychology and speech of the soul. PA: Jessica Kingsley Publishers.
- Malchiodi, C. (ed.) (2005). Expressive Therapies. New York, NY: Guilford Press.
- McNiff, S. (2004). Art heals: how creativity heals the soul. Boston, MA: Shambala.
- McNiff, S. (1992) Arts and Medicine. Boston, MA: Shambhala.
- McNiff, S. (1981). The arts and Psychotherapy. Springfield, IL: Charles Thomas, Pub.
- Rogers, N. (1995). The creative connection: Expressive arts as healing. Palo Alto, CA: Science and Behavior Books, Inc.
