= The Rose Bush: An Anti-war Book =

2025 Children's picture book

- Author: Ayesha Chenoy
- Illustrator: Riya Katiyar
- Language: English
- Genre: Nonfiction
- Published: November 2025
- Publisher: Penguin Random House India
- Publication place: India
- Media type: Paperback
- Pages: 48
- ISBN: 9780143479970
- OCLC: 1607068608

The Rose Bush: An Anti-war Book is a 2025 children's picture book written by Indian author Ayesha Chenoy and illustrated by Riya Katiyar. It is about two neighboring families whose shared garden and rose bush become divided after an argument.

== Plot ==
Two families live side by side and share a garden. They "had different gods. They ate different foods. They dressed differently. Even their pets were very different": one household keeps a cat, the other a dog. Despite those differences they play football and hide-and-seek together and jointly tend a rose bush that grows in the middle of the garden. An unspecified quarrel between the parents ends the friendship. A barbed-wire fence is put up between the properties. The children are confused and distressed; the rose bush, no longer cared for, begins to wither. The pets tear down the fence. Later, the families reconcile and nurse the plant back to life.

== Reviews ==
Avantika Bhuyan discussed the book in the December 2025 Mint Lounge "Raising Parents" feature on what Indian parents and children bonded over during the year. Bhuyan wrote that when Chenoy "penned The Rose Bush, she didn’t realise that it would be the gateway to many complex conversations."

Dennis Pierce featured the book in the August 2026 School Library Journal round-up "Imagine That! New Picture Books Tap into Children’s Sense of Wonder." Pierce described it as “a simple yet powerful story about the importance of empathy and of talking through disagreements," and as timely "amid pervasive conflict."

Kirkus Reviews called the book "a straightforward and relevant anti-division story that one hopes will inspire young readers,” and said Chenoy’s "simple story convincingly gets across a timely message of empathy, cooperation, and the value of finding common ground," making it “a helpful asset for parents wishing to teach these traits." It praised Katiyar’s limited-palette digital art for highlighting "the narrative’s important moments."

== See also ==
- To, The Bravest Person I Know
