= Expressive therapies =

Use of creative arts as a form of therapy

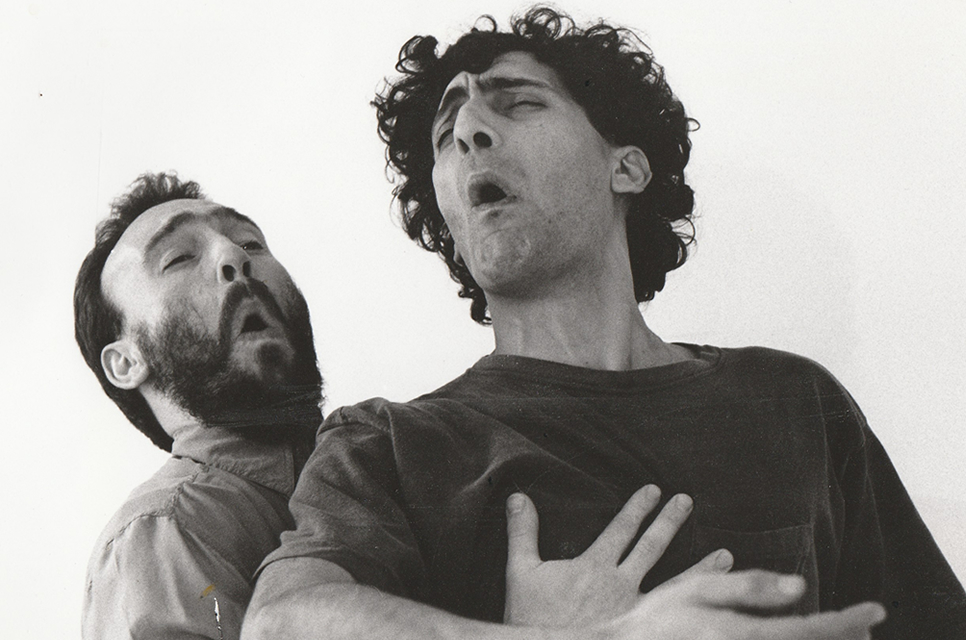
British psychotherapist Paul Newham using Expressive Therapy with a client.

The expressive therapies are the use of the creative arts as a form of therapy, including the distinct disciplines expressive arts therapy and the creative arts therapies (art therapy, dance/movement therapy, drama therapy, music therapy, writing therapy, poetry therapy, and psychodrama). The expressive therapies are based on the assumption that people can heal through the various forms of creative expression. Expressive therapists share the belief that through creative expression and the tapping of the imagination, people can examine their body, feelings, emotions, and thought process.

== Definition and credentialing ==
Expressive arts therapy is the practice of using imagery, storytelling, dance, music, drama, poetry, movement, horticulture, dreamwork, and visual arts together, in an integrated way, to foster human growth, development, and healing. Expressive arts therapy is its own distinct therapeutic discipline, an inter-modal discipline where the therapist and client move freely between drawing, dancing, music, drama, and poetry.

According to the National Organization for Arts in Health (NOAH), what distinguishes the six creative arts therapies—art, dance/movement, drama, music and poetry therapy as well as psychodrama—from expressive arts therapy is that expressive arts therapy interventions are designed to include more than one of the "expressive" art forms (art, dance, drama, music, poetry), whereas creative arts therapists, such as art, dance/movement, drama, music, poetry and psychodrama therapists, are often intensively trained and educated to use only one modality in their practice. But NOAH also acknowledged that the terms "are often used interchangeably in the field", and that in any case all such professionals should collaborate closely.

The International Expressive Arts Therapy Association (IEATA) is the responsible organization handling the credentialing of expressive arts therapists.

The National Coalition of Creative Arts Therapies Association (NCCATA) connects all six modalities of the creative arts therapies. However, each modality of the creative arts therapies has its own national association that regulates professional credentials, establishes educational standards and hosts annual conferences for the purpose of exchanging new ideas and research.

== History ==
=== Early years ===
Margaret Naumburg, Edith Kramer, Hanna Kwiatkowska and Elinor Ulman have been credited with being the pioneers of the field of sensory art therapy. While all of these scientists made significant contributions, Margaret Naumburg has been hailed the "Mother of Art Therapy". Her work focused on the use of art, mainly as a psychoanalytic diagnostic tool. It followed closely other psychoanalytic practices of the time, and was viewed as the communication of unconscious ideas and emotions that were being expressed by the patient.

== Modern approaches ==
Today's art therapy is broken down into three different approaches: psychodynamic, humanistic, and learning and developmental. The psychodynamic approach uses terms such as "transference" and defense mechanism to describe why individuals express the art in the way they do, and why this is an expression of the subconscious. The humanistic approach is more of a positive psychology approach, and is defined by an optimistic view of humans, and how expression through their art allows them to take control over these emotions. The learning and developmental approach focuses on the art therapy as a method to assist children who have emotional and developmental disabilities.

== Education ==
Each national association of the different modalities of expressive therapies sets its own educational standards. In the United States, there are a fair number of colleges that offer approved programs in compliance with the national associations' credentialing requirements.

There are 37 universities for music therapy, 34 universities for art therapy, seven universities for dance/movement therapy, and five universities for drama therapy, as well as 5 universities for expressive arts therapy, that have approved master's degree programs in the United States. In addition, the American Music Therapy Association (AMTA) has 75 undergraduate music therapy programs approved. Once finished with an academic degree, potential therapists have to apply for credentialing at the responsible national association.

== Creative arts therapies modalities ==
There are six creative arts therapy modalities, recognized by the NCCATA, including art therapy, dance therapy, drama therapy, music therapy, poetry therapy and psychodrama. In some areas, the terms Creative Arts Therapy and Creative Arts Therapist may only be used by those who are properly licensed, as is the case in the State of New York.

=== Art therapy ===
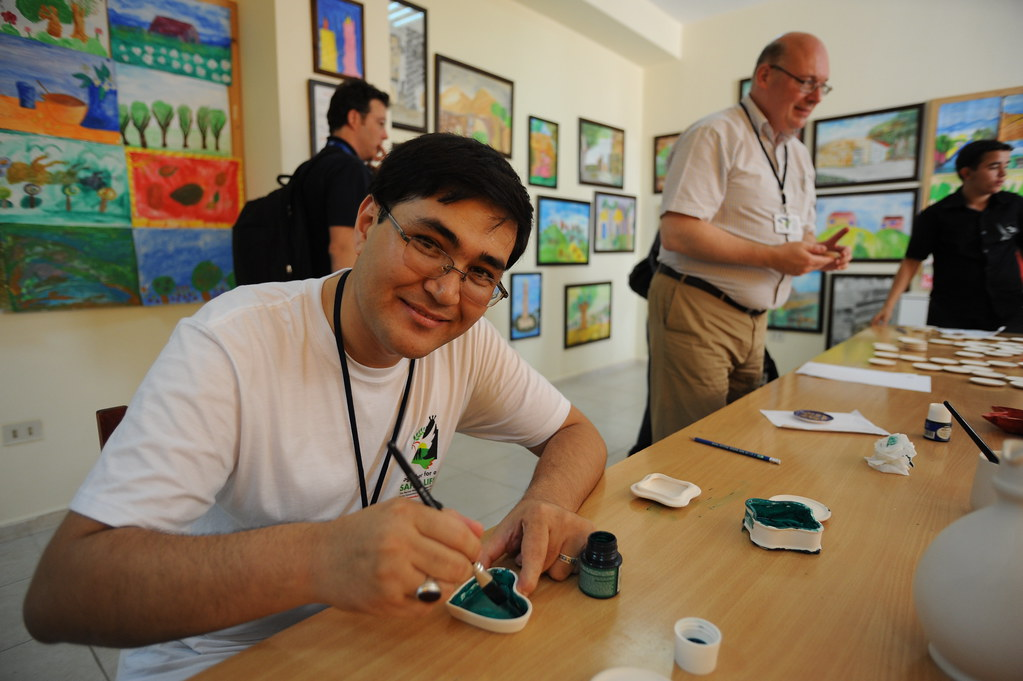
Illustrating Art Therapy by painting a ceramic heart. This is one way of what Art Therapy could look like.

Created in the 1940s, Art therapy consists of the combination of psychotherapy and art. The creative process as well as the created art piece serves as a foundation for self-exploration, understanding, acceptance and eventually healing and personal growth. The creative act in therapy therefore can be seen as a means of re-experiencing inner conflict connected to resolution. The four main types are expression, imagination, active participation, and mind-body connection. Assisting in those with depression, breast cancer, and asthma, art therapy can be done at any age and does not require any skill set. Art Therapy has undergone extensive research which revealed that it decreases anxiety, increases self-concept and quality of life, and reduces negative thoughts. With two main goals in mind, Art Therapy strives to enhance personal and relational goals for those in need. Self-esteem, social skills, and cognitive functions are also said to be an area of importance. A certified art therapist is essential in order for the therapy to ensure improvement, however common art therapy using even a friend to discuss trauma can be enough to help someone.

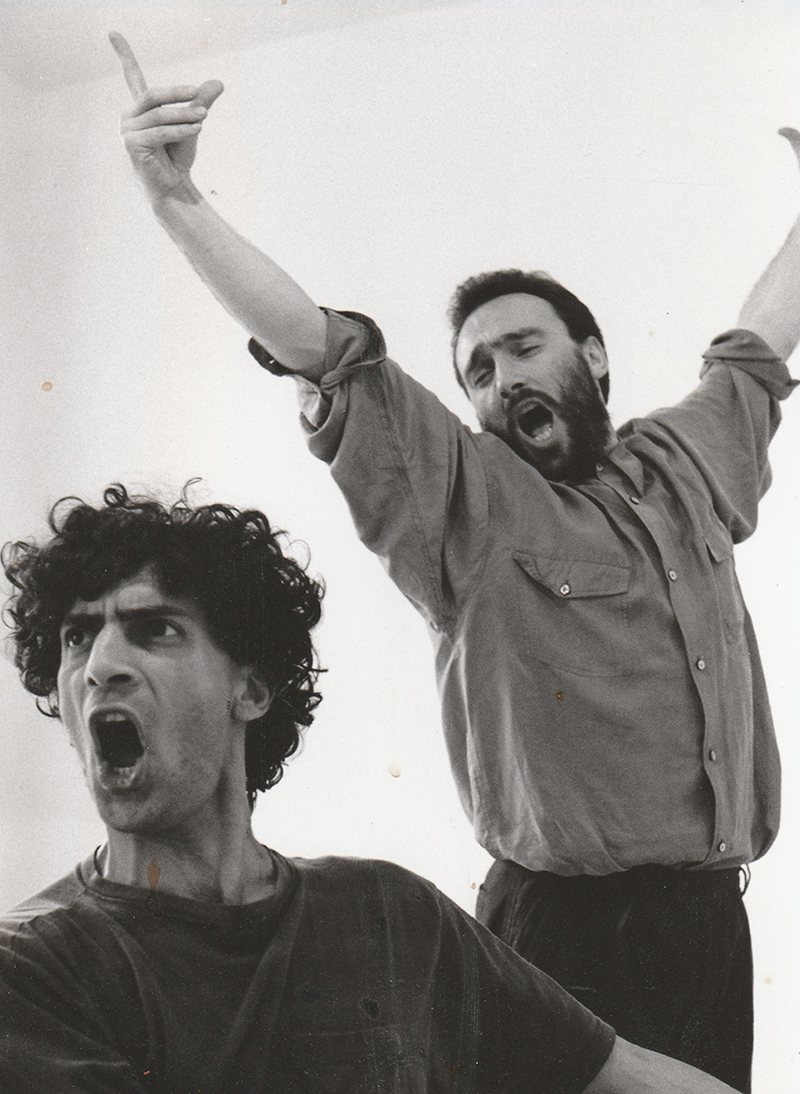
A psychotherapist using Expressive Therapy with a client, to communicate through characters

=== Dance/movement therapy ===
Like other creative arts therapy modalities, dance/movement therapy is based on the assumption that "mind, body and spirit are inseparable and interconnected" (ADTA). Movement is the primary tool of intervention in a therapy session, but dance/movement therapy also uses the art of play in therapy. Like other creative art therapies it uses primarily nonverbal communication. Dance and movement therapy has shown to be the most beneficial in those who enjoy exercises that involve less talking an expression through movements.

=== Drama therapy ===
Drama therapy refers to the combination of the two disciplines drama/theatre and psychotherapy. Drama Therapy, as a hybrid of both disciplines, uses theater techniques to treat individuals with mental health, cognitive, and developmental disorders. Through the art of play and pretend, patients gain perspective in therapy to their life experiences, which in the field is referred to as "aesthetic distance".

=== Music therapy ===
Music Therapy is the use of music, music-making, or other music-related interventions within a therapeutic relationship. Music therapy is a broad field with many areas and populations to specialize in. A holistic practice, music therapy can address emotional/psychological, cognitive, communication, motor, sensory, pain, social, behavioral, end of life, and even spiritual needs. This is due in part to music being processed in many areas of the brain. Music therapy helps patients "communicate, process difficult experiences, and improve motor or cognitive functioning" (Jenni Rook, MT-BC, LCPC, 2016). When used as psychotherapy, at its core, music therapy may use music as a symbolic representation and expression of the psychological world of the individual.

Townsend's study in the "Journal of Child Psychology and Psychiatry and Allied Disciplines" has shown that 1 in 5 children who lost their parent are most likely to develop a psychiatric disorder. This finding underscored the significance of instructors to initiate writing on the subjects of "death" and "loss" in academic writing. One of the few ways to bring this into practice is through music-making or songwriting.

Songwriting allows individual to process the trauma they experience in their life in three ways: By telling stories that have been passed down to them; by connecting their songs to cultural traditions; and by sharing their feelings with each other and their community. Songwriting is a way to organize a narrative. Through forming a coherent story, an unpleasant or chaotic situation can be made more approachable.

Deroo's research focuses on the Black teenage girl, Noriah, who wrote the song named "Air I Breathe" in remembrance of her late mother and sister. Through Noriah's story, Deroo tries to find the answer to how can youths tackle the nuanced implications of loss using creative expression. Noriah's experience shows that there can be many therapeutic possibilities with songwriting. By using eulogies in her songs, Noriah is able to communicate her bond with her lost ones through lyrics. As demonstrated with the composition of "Air I Breathe", while the memories of Noriah and her departed would eventually fade, "Air I Breathe" serves as a permanent reminder for Noriah to keep in mind the memories. During a speech in the university classroom, Noriah expressed her purpose in writing the song. “I wrote a song about the loss of my little sister and biological mother, back to back, and so much love I had for them, and what I couldn't get out. It was a way to get out the rest of the feeling that I had—telling that story to you directly, but I could sing it instantly. It was like a form of therapy” (Deroo).

In addition, writing and sharing about lost can benefit the community who then can learn from the experiences that were previously private. As Ryden argues, audiences embrace the story as if they are their own, making meaning of the experience in their own ways. This idea was further demonstrated through the interaction between Noriah and Wendy. Being inspired by Noriah's song, Wendy entered the room with her own experience of loss.

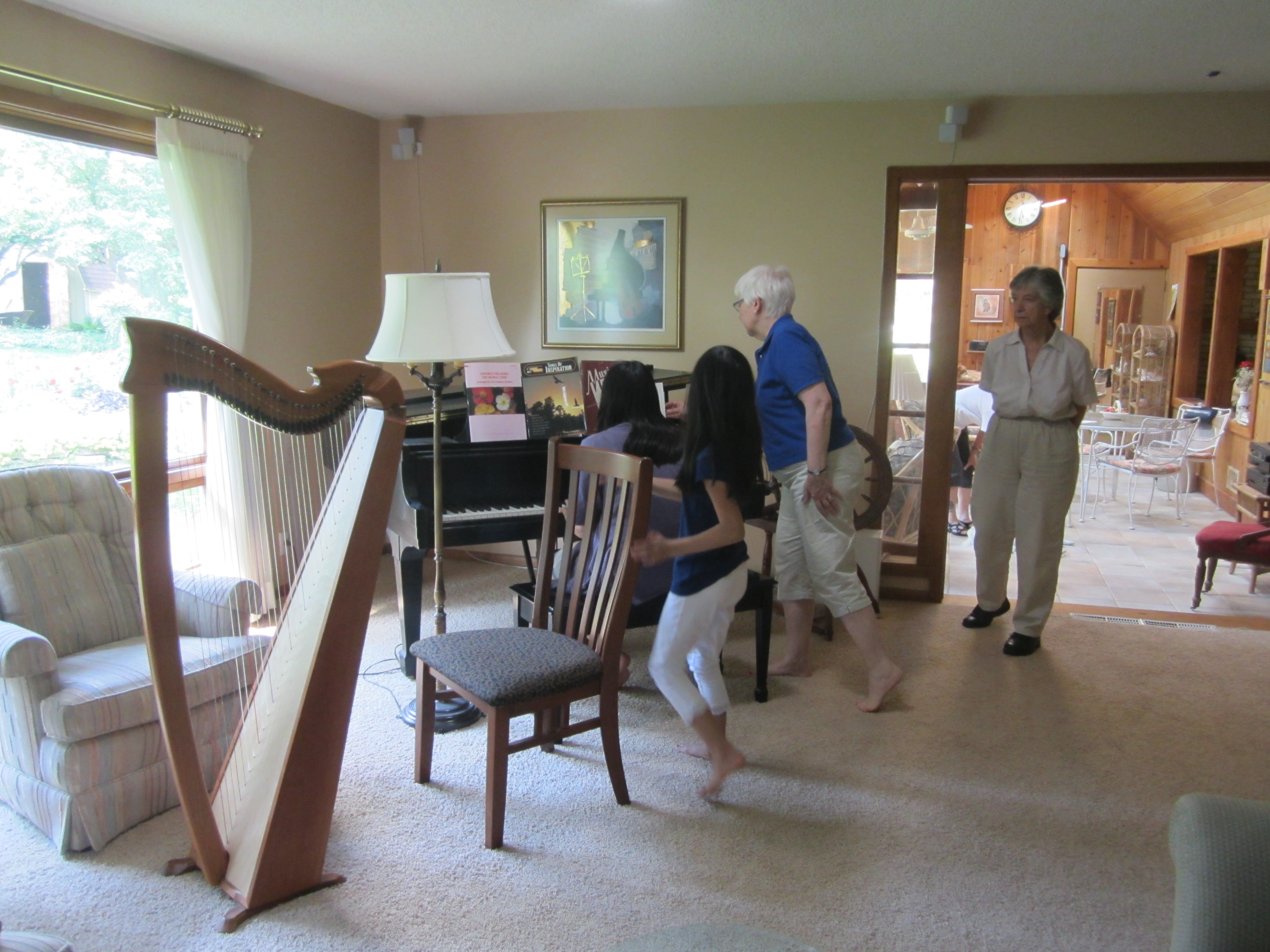
Music Therapy for Woman with Alzheimer's Disease

Music Therapy also benefits a variety of disorders, like cardiac and mental disorders. It aids those who have depression, anxiety, autism, substance abuse, and Alzheimer's. In cases where a person is suffering from mental disorders, music relieves stress, improves self-esteem, etc. Evidence has shown that people who have used Music Therapy in the past have improved in several aspects of life that do not concern just those suffering from mental illness. In music therapy, people may improve their singing which may then impact their ability to speak. Therefore, it can change several aspects of life, not just those of helping mental illness.

=== Poetry therapy ===
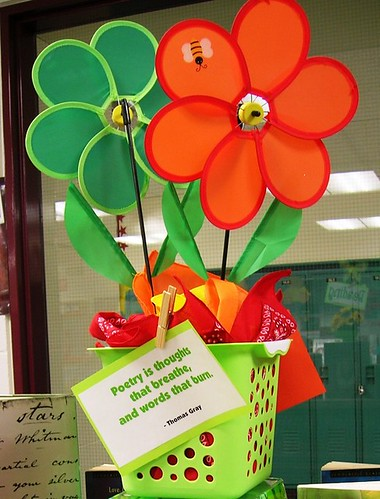
"Poetry is Thoughts that Breathe, and Words that Burn." Thomas Gray

Poetry therapy (also referred to using the broader term bibliotherapy) stands out from other creative arts therapies, which are all based on the assumption of the existence of a language that functions without words. Poetry therapy, however, is the use of the written word to bring healing and personal growth. For instance, To, The Bravest Person I Know is one of the classic illustrations of how to use poetry to overcome anxiety, depression (mood), and other sorts of insecurity.

In Manning's research about high school poetry classes, he found that through poetry classes, students are able to reimagine their struggles as a source of strength, develop a sense of possibility, and build bonds that empower them to speak through the silence that surrounded their life struggles. Manning advocated the need for opportunities for creative expression in classroom spaces. Not only would this practice encourage youth to express themselves authentically using their own words in an environment where their voice is constrained by school literacy, but it would also contribute to positive changes to the current school environment by honoring students' voices and life experiences.

=== Psychodrama ===
Psychodrama is a distinct form of psychotherapy developed by Jacob L. Moreno in the early 20th century. Moreno, a trained psychiatrist himself, had the goal of creating a more effective, action-based form of psychotherapy. Later it was modified by other authors according to Sigmund Freud and C.G. Jung. He developed a clear three phase structure (warm up, action, sharing) to his therapy as well as multiple intervention-methods that are still used by psychodrama therapists today.

Although related, psychodrama and drama therapy describe different modalities within the field of creative arts therapies. Whereas psychodrama uses real-life experience of the patients in therapy to "practice new and more effective roles and behaviors" (ASGPP), drama therapy lets the patients explore more fictional stories, such as improvised scenes, myths or fairy tales.

== Benefits ==
=== Self-discovery ===
- This discovery often leads to a relief of emotional tension caused by past events, and can be used as a coping mechanism.
- Given the ability to claim your own story, which helps with personal affirmation.

=== Empowerment ===
- Expressive therapy gives individuals the ability to articulate their fears and stresses in a non-conventional way, and often leads to sense of control over these emotions.
- Particularly beneficial for vulnerable populations such as youth experiencing homelessness, as it helps them process trauma, regulate emotions, and rebuild a sense of identity and self-worth.

=== Stress relief ===
- Effective for stress relief by itself, but can provide even better results if paired with other relaxation devices such as guided imagery.
- Expressive therapy provides individuals with a foundation on which they can recognize and confront pain.

=== Physical pain relief and rehabilitation ===
- Expressive therapy has been shown to help decrease pain in patients who are recovering from illness and injury. It has also been used in patients who are chronically or terminally ill, to provide relief and pain control.

== Empirical evidence ==
=== Ball (2002) ===
Ball conducted long-term research on five children who were considered to be severely emotionally disturbed. These children participated in 50 art therapy sessions, and the results suggested that the art therapy was successful, and the children showed marked progress in their treatment over the course of the 50 sessions.

=== Pifalo (2006) ===
In this study, 41 girls or young women who had been sexually abused were given structured group art therapy for eight weeks, and were measured before treatment using the Briere's Trauma Symptom Checklist for Children (TSCC). They were given the test again after the treatment, and for 9 out of 10 of the girls, a statistically significant reduction in scores on the test was observed.

=== Bar-Sela, Atid, Danos, Gabay & Epelbaum (2007) ===
This study worked with 60 adults who had cancer. These adults attended weekly individual art therapy, in addition to watercolor painting classes. After just four sessions, the experimental group saw marked and significant improvement in depression and fatigue, as measured by the Hospital Anxiety and Depression Scale and a brief fatigue inventory. While they showed a decrease in depression, there was no significant difference in the levels of anxiety of the patients.

=== Gusak (2006) ===
In this study, the researcher worked with 29 incarcerated men. The men attended eight sessions of group art therapy, and were tested before and after the treatment using the Beck Depression Inventory Short Form. After the eight sessions, all of the men showed significant improvement in the symptoms of depression and their score on the Beck Depression Inventory reflected these improvements.

=== Bulfone et al. (2009) ===
In this study Bulfone et al. utilized music therapy as their treatment. 60 women who had been diagnosed with stage 1 or 2 breast cancer were randomly assigned to a control or experimental group. The control group received standard assistance before chemotherapy, while the experimental group had the chance to listen to music before the chemotherapy began. The results showed that the anxiety levels of the experimental group were significantly lower than those of the control group, and also showed a significantly lower level of depression.

== Applications ==
=== Expressive writing therapy in virtual setting (2024) ===
Virtual settings have expanded the reach of expressive writing therapy. A study on intimate partner violence (IPV) survivors demonstrated that online writing sessions in a structured environment significantly reduced trauma symptoms, providing a safe and accessible space for emotional processing.

== See also ==
- Cinema therapy
- Clinical psychology
- Counseling psychology
- Expressive therapies continuum
- Freedom of speech
- Psychotherapy
