= Prokarin =

Alternative medicine preparation

Prokarin (also known as Procarin) is an alternative medicine that consists of a mixture of histamine and caffeine. It is marketed as a treatment for fatigue in multiple sclerosis (MS), although in the 1950s multiple sclerosis was believed to be an alergic condition and Prokarin was developed as a treatment for the condition. The idea behind this combination is that caffeine is a generally well tolerated stimulant which can help treat fatigue. Like most stimulants, caffeine causes vasoconstriction, so the vasodilation effects from concomitant histamine can counteract this. Prokarin is formulated as a transdermal patch since histamine isn't well absorbed when consumed orally. While brand name Prokarin can be expensive, it can be compounded by pharmacists if prescribed by a physician.

Quackwatch lists Prokarin as one of the multiple sclerosis "cures" of which people should be wary. While it doesn't treat the disease progression of MS, its usage for symptomatic management of fatigue in MS is controversial.
