= To, The Bravest Person I Know =

2021 collection of poems by Ayesha Chenoy

- Author: Ayesha Chenoy
- Language: English
- Subject: Psychology
- Genre: Poetry; Self-help book
- Published: 22 March 2021
- Publisher: Penguin Random House India
- Media type: Hardcover
- Pages: 208
- ISBN: 978-0143452584
- OCLC: 1245578918

To, The Bravest Person I Know is a collection of poems by Indian author Ayesha Chenoy.

== Background ==
This collection of poems offers insight into overcoming various mental health conditions and issues, including anxiety, depression (mood), and forms of insecurity. The book can be considered an illustration of bibliotherapy.

== Reception ==
Soma Basu, a Deputy Editor at The Hindu says, "[The author] explores the whole construct of ‘normal’, one that is created by society. And, she writes, at the end of the day, it takes bravery to conquer those emotions that make you feel lesser than ‘normal’." In the year 2021, The Hindu included the book in the list of "8 self-help guides by professionals on leading a healthy life."

According to Shraddha Kamdar, Deputy Editor at Femina (India), "The writing might look simple, but it takes a look at the different sides of bravery and what constitutes it, and subtly hints on how societal definitions and constricted norms fall flat when various personal incidents are examined closely."

Shrabonti Bagchi, the National Features Editor of Mint (newspaper) suggests, "[The book] questions the premise of being ‘normal’, and tells the reader that their negative emotions, from fear and anxiety to insecurity and jealousy, are absolutely valid, particularly useful in the Indian context, where people are often encouraged to suppress and dismiss these emotions in favour of a generic and spurious ‘positivity’."

== See also ==
- The Rose Bush: An Anti-war Book
