= Cinema therapy =

Form of psychotherapy

Cinema therapy or movie therapy is a form of expressive therapy – like art, music and dance therapy – for medical and mental health issues. It is also used as a form of self-help. There have been multiple areas of improvement in experiences with cinema therapy, like improving self-confidence and self-esteem. Clinicians can combine cinema therapy with other therapies, including cognitive-behavioral and behavioristic approaches.

== Definition ==
Cinema therapy is defined by Segen's Medical Dictionary as:

A form of therapy or self-help that uses movies, particularly videos, as therapeutic tools. Cinema therapy can be a catalyst for healing and growth for those who are open to learning how movies affect people and to watching certain films with conscious awareness. Cinema therapy allows one to use the effect of imagery, plot, music, etc. in films on the psyche for insight, inspiration, emotional release or relief and natural change. Used as part of psychotherapy, cinema therapy is an innovative method based on traditional therapeutic principles.

There are several types of cinema therapy, with varying degrees of entertainment and therapeutic value. Popcorn cinema therapy is primarily cinema entertainment, that may result in an emotional release. Evocative cinema therapy helps individuals connect with storylines and the movie characters. In the process, they "learn about themselves in more profound ways." Cathartic cinema therapy helps a person access their emotions and may be used in the early stage of psychotherapy.

== Evocative Cinema Therapy ==
Evocative therapy is one of the approaches that cinema therapy can be split into. It is known for its relation to emotional release which can influence the release of neurotransmitters that are associated with rewards, social bonding, and pleasure while viewers watch a film. Additionally, endorphins and cortisol can be released depending on the content of the film that is being viewed. For example, a comedy movie may be therapeautic for those with depression whereas emotional movies may trigger the release of cortisol.

== Overview ==
Cinema therapy has been said by its proponents to change an individual's thoughts, feelings and ability to manage life events, and can be primarily separated in two approaches: evocative and cathartic. Film is an art form that uses storytelling foundations to create a visually appealing piece that captures the eye of their audience. Audience members are invested in the characters, their stories, and other elements of the film, all while subconsciously grabbing other smaller aspects like lessons and the reasonings for the characters' journeys. Movies are used in some prisons to help individuals understand what led them to commit and be convicted of crimes.

After viewing the movie, it is recommended to assess one's reaction to the movie, such as: What did you like or not like about the movie? Who did you find to be attractive and unattractive characters? Was there someone in the film that you'd like to be more like?

Like art, music and dance therapy, cinema therapy is a supplemental means of therapy to be used within traditional therapy, according to Dr. Bruce Skalarew, a psychoanalyst and psychiatrist. He is also co-chair of the Forum for Psychoanalytic Study of Film.

Cinema therapy as a form of self-help for women using a variety of movies was popularized by the humorous series by Nancy Peske and Beverly West. Cinema therapy inspired a wraparound television show of the same name on Romance Classics (later Women's Entertainment).

== Films or movies ==
Examples of cinema therapy categories and movies are:

Category	Movie	Other themes
Addiction	28 Days (2000)	Alcoholism, starting over
Addiction	Gia (1998)	
Addiction	Leaving Las Vegas (1995)	Alcoholism, suicide, fired or laid off
Addiction	The Panic in Needle Park (1971)	Self-destructive romance
Addiction	When a Man Loves a Woman (1994)	Alcoholism, marriage
Domestic violence or rape	The Accused (1988)	Haunted by the past, redemption, social injustice
Domestic violence or rape	Enough (2002)	Stalkers
Domestic violence or rape	Frankie and Johnny (1991)	Haunted by the past, romantic relationship struggles, starting over, workplace romance
Domestic violence or rape	Sleeping with the Enemy (1991)	Haunted by the past, stalkers, starting over
Domestic violence or rape	Thelma & Louise (1991)	Revenge, self-discovery
Obsessive–compulsive disorder	As Good as It Gets (1997)	Love, opposites attract, redemption, romantic relationship struggles, unlikely friendships
Obsessive–compulsive disorder	Matchstick Men (2003)	Cons and scams, fathers and daughters, therapy
Obsessive–compulsive disorder	What About Bob? (1991)	
Romantic relationship struggles	The Accidental Tourist (1988)	Haunted by the past, opposites attract, starting over
Romantic relationship struggles	Pretty Woman (1990)	Cinderella stories, opposites attract, prostitutes
Romantic relationship struggles	The Way We Were (1973)	Crumbling marriages, opposites attract
Romantic relationship struggles	Stanley & Iris (1990)	Death of a partner, opposites attract, teachers and students
Romantic relationship struggles	When Harry Met Sally... (1989)	Faltering friendships, opposites attract, single life

Other categories include coping with prejudice, childhood trauma, eating disorders, suicide, family issues and relationships, loss, psychological thriller, and gay and lesbian relationships.

== Marvel Cinematic Universe ==
Many people know the American Marvel Cinematic Universe (MCU) for their superhero movies and comics, but studies have shown that these movies have characteristics and aspects that can be used in cinema therapy. The Marvel Cinematic Universe comics can be dated back to the 1920s, but the movies are at the latest seventeen years old, Iron Man being the first of the universe after being released in 2008.

Marvel movies are not only about superheroes, but also about other socio-political issues and various everyday problems. The reality created in these movies are ones that mimic the world around the audience. The movies produced in the universe have various sub-themes like mental health, economic, cultural, and socio-political issues. While these movies are normally geared towards children and adolescents, each movie has different themes to explore that counselors can use to assist with the health of their patients.

When watching Marvel movies, viewers are invited into the mindset of each character, giving them the chance to analyze their emotions, actions, and attitudes, allowing the viewer to understand each characters' values and compare them to their own. Each character in the MCU has their own set of weaknesses, regardless of their superhero abilities, making them more relatable to the viewers because of their portrayals of realistic issues. There are characters that deal with panic and anxiety disorders, depression, dissociative identity disorder, self-identity issues, and so on. Having characters that are facing these issues gives the viewers something to relate to and reflect upon.

The MCU doesn't only have characters that portray these real life issues, but also has films that spread messages about women empowerment, and representing minority communities in ways that they may not be seen in real life, shedding light and bringing positivity to those communities.

== Programs ==
=== MediCinema ===
MediCinema is a UK-based registered charity that places cinemas in hospital buildings and screens films for patients, caregivers and family members during the patient's hospital stay. The first installation was at the St Thomas' Hospital in London in 1999. It allows individuals to leave what can be isolating rooms and wards for a period of entertainment.

Another of the other complexes is at Defence Medical Rehabilitation Centre at Headley Court. The Health and Welfare Director at the Royal British Legion, Sue Freeth, stated "Rehabilitation is not only a huge physical challenge, but involves recuperating mentally as well. This excellent new facility will assist our brave Service personnel in doing just that."

=== Chicago Institute for the Moving Image ===
Chicago Institute for the Moving Image (CIMI) uses the creation of films as a means of therapy for individuals in therapeutic care with depression, amnesia, schizophrenia and other psychiatric illnesses. Writing, producing and directing movies "provides a certain amount of therapy, organization, and order that people with psychological diseases need, and it helps the therapist see what the conflicts are within their patients' lives," said CIMI's executive director, Joshua Flanders. The result provides a view of the filmmaker's world and has resulted in "enormous breakthroughs".
