= Fengyou essence =

Chinese patent medicine

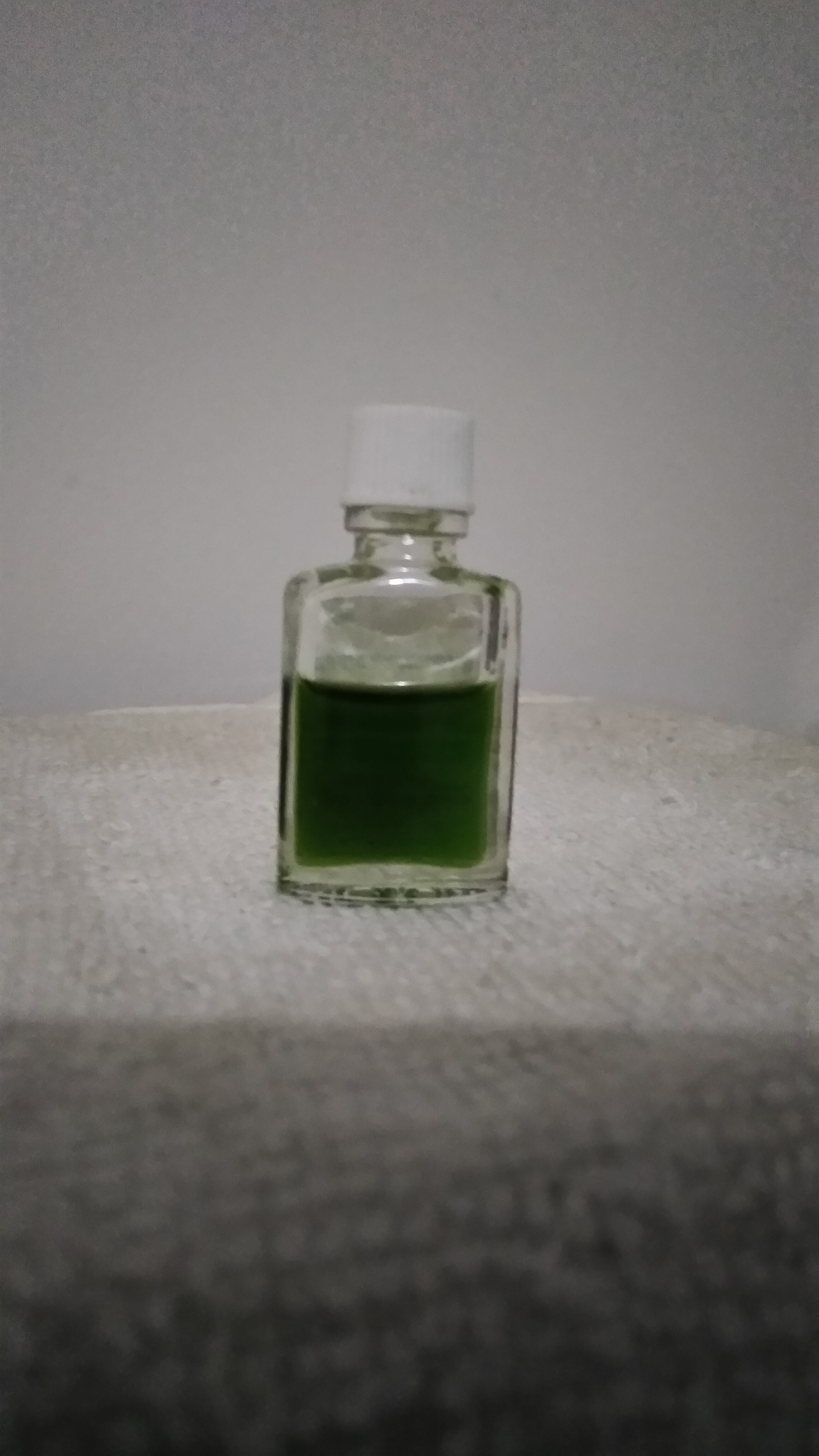
Fengyou essence

Fengyou essence (simplified Chinese: 风油精; traditional Chinese: 風油精; pinyin: Fēngyóu jīng) is a type of topical Chinese patent medicine, usually in the form of a liniment or oily liquid with a light green color. Its origins are claimed to be in Southeast Asia, and it is said to relieve the symptoms of various conditions, including mosquito bites, coughing, motion sickness, etc.

== Ingredients ==
According to China's food and medicine administration, Fengyou essence include liquid paraffin, chlorophyll, menthol, methyl salicylate, camphor, eucalyptus oil, and eugenol.

== Uses ==
Fengyou essence is mainly used topically after mosquito bites to prevent itching, for easing headaches or dizziness, for motion sickness, and for reducing rheumatic pains.

Although taking the product orally is permitted in its instructions, it is advised not to, so as to avoid adverse reactions including intestinal discomfort.

== Contraindications ==
1.Infants and young children	Infants' and young children's skin is more delicate than that of adults, and the camphor within Fengyou essence may penetrate it more easily and cause damage to red blood cells.
2.Pregnant women	Camphor may cross the placental barrier and hamper the normal development of a fetus.
3.People with allergies	A small subset of people may experience allergic reactions, resulting in rashes and itching.
4.People with damaged skin	The application of Fengyou to damaged skin may cause a burning sensation.
