= Grinberg Method =

Method of teaching

The Grinberg Method is a method of teaching that focuses on using the body, specifically body attention, perception and the individual's direct personal experience. The goal is for people to learn to be attentive to themselves and their surroundings, and stop automatic limiting habits in order to increase their ability to recuperate, and attain personal goals and well-being. The method was developed in the early 1980s by Avi Grinberg.

== Origin ==
The Grinberg Method was developed by Avi Grinberg, who claimed that people lacked the ability to use their natural capacity for self-healing and to prevent conditions that diminish their quality of life. He described his observations and reasoning in the book Fear, Pain and Some Other Friends.

== Concepts of the method ==
=== Shifting attention from mind to body ===
His method focuses on body attention based on the view that life is experienced by the body - people's thoughts, actions, feelings and sensations are all expressed in and through the body. Body attention, on his view, is non-verbal and is the experience itself. According to his method, uninterrupted, the body will display the natural, inherent inclination to take care of itself, heal, adapt to an ever-changing reality, develop and be fulfilled, thus constantly aiming to reach closer to a state of well-being.

=== Stopping patterns of behavior ===
The methodology consists of noticing and clarifying what is happening routinely and "then having the willingness and ability to stop it". The method focuses on a recurring reaction and pattern of behavior of the individual in relation to a routine situation which one wants to alter, maintaining that what a person can really control and be responsible for, is his own reaction. Stopping is a physical act done with body attention, will and choice, to discontinue the part of the experience that one can perceive and control. For example: a person is scared while studying for an exam and reacts with shallow breathing, contracting the shoulders and diaphragm, locking the knees, becoming worried, and disliking situation. By paying attention to one's body and learning to purposefully reproduce and to stop all these behavior, "...the person can choose to refuse the reaction, relax the shoulders and diaphragm, unlock the knees, breathe differently and stop judging and blaming". "Letting the body work" means allowing the body to function more freely and rebalance itself.

=== Personal history ===
According to Grinberg, to continue habits automatically is to repeat history, not to perceive reality directly now but rather through filters of the inner-world that include past conclusions and beliefs, old fear and pain, recurring moods etc. The idea of an unresolved or "open" issue actually refers to a state of past imbalance that was never corrected, and which resurfaces repeatedly, as an "open-ended gestalt". Relating to personal history through the body is focused on stopping behaviors that are not relevant to one's present life.

=== Fear ===
According to the method, fear is a natural protection mechanism, an integral capacity that enables recognition of potential threat. Fear triggers various physical responses that alert, energize and enable quick and relevant action in a dangerous situation. While fear appears at the moment danger arises, human beings can anticipate a fearful event that might happen and trigger a similar response although nothing dangerous is happening.

=== Pain ===
Grinberg views pain as a major part of the human condition. He claims even though pain is a natural part of life, the body can accommodate and transform it. People often do not know how to let the body deal with pain, consequently it generates fear and efforts to avoid it. Practicing the methodology is intended to teach people to gain control and stop trying to avoid the pain, to be fully attentive to their body and experience of it. When this occurs, energy is freed to deal with the pain and related sensations, giving the body an opportunity to mend and heal. This can be applied to any form of pain or discomfort, and regular focused practice can develop more confidence and courage to cope in painful circumstances.

== Profession ==
To qualify as a Grinberg Method practitioner, students complete a three years program of at least 990 academic hours of study and training. To advance to the second and third year of studies, students have to pass a supervision meeting with a Licensed Teacher, for which they get a certificate for their learning stage (Practitioner Level 1 and 2). At the end of their third year, students demonstrate their work with clients in two supervised meetings, submit two training programs and complete the graduation requirements as set by the Supervisory Academic Board of the Grinberg Method. Following satisfactory fulfillment of these conditions, they receive a Diploma of Qualified Practitioner, and can join the International Association of Grinberg Method Practitioners (IAGMP) and continue to post-graduate advanced courses.

== Controversies ==
In 2012, in a Swiss TV program, Danièle Muller, President of the Swiss Association for the Defense of the Family and the Individual (ASDFI), claimed to have received testimonials from people who have completed the training to become Grinberg trainers. According to Muller, they say that the leaders of the method intervened in their private lives, they drift from their friends and their families, investing all their time and money "in promoting the method."

In the same TV program, a psychiatrist who deals with the treatment of victims of sectarian derivals claims to have worked with several former members and according to her at Grinberg this is what is taught: "Your body knows a truth about yourself that your head ignores, and me, the therapist, masseur, I will tell you what your body feels". For the psychiatrist it is destructive of any possible private sphere and there is no possibility to keep a safe distance between the patient and the therapist.
