= Tapas Acupressure Technique =

Alternative medicine therapy

Alternative medicine
- Claims: Applying pressure to meridian points on the body, derived from acupuncture, can release energy blockages that cause negative emotions.
- Related fields: acupuncture, acupressure
- Year proposed: 1993
- Original proponents: Tapas Fleming
- See also: Thought Field Therapy, Emotional Freedom Techniques

Tapas Acupressure Technique (or TAT) is an alternative medicine therapy that claims to clear negative emotions and past traumas. Though the full technique was invented in 1993 by Tapas Fleming, TAT incorporates elements of and builds on other acupressure techniques. TAT is classified as energy therapies as TAT claims to employ Qi (chi). This is the “energy” that has historically been believed to flow through the body in Asian medicine. There is no scientific proof that qi exists. However this claim of qi flow is not to be confused with putative energy for which no scientific basis has been found and no biophysical means of action determined. TAT shows many characteristics consistent with pseudoscience.

== History ==
Invented in 1993 by Tapas Fleming, the underlying idea claims that unresolved emotional trauma leads to a blockage of the natural flow of putative energy. Practitioners of TAT claim that self application of light pressure to four areas of the head (inner corner of both eyes, one-half-inch above the space between the eyebrows, and the back of head) while placing attention on a series of verbal steps releases this blockage and allows for healing. TAT was originally intended to be an allergy elimination protocol, but the emphasis switched to emotional trauma.

== Scientific evaluation ==
No scientifically plausible method of action is proposed for Tapas Acupressure Technique, instead relying on unvalidated putative energy and meridians with no identified biophysical or histological basis. A 2005 review of so-called "Power Therapies" concluded that TAT and similar techniques "offered no new scientifically valid theories of action, show only non-specific efficacy, show no evidence that they offer substantive improvements to extant psychiatric care, yet display many characteristics consistent with pseudoscience." TAT also conforms to the "nine practices of pseudoscience" as identified by AR Pratkins. There are many, primarily psychological, explanations for positive therapeutic outcomes such as the placebo effect or cognitive dissonance. A 2009 review identified "methodological flaws" in research that had reported "small successes" for TAT and a related "energy psychology" therapy (Emotional Freedom Techniques) "are potentially attributable to well-known cognitive and behavioral techniques that are included with the energy manipulation." The report concluded that "Psychologists and researchers should be wary of using such techniques, and make efforts to inform the public about the ill effects of therapies that advertise miraculous claims."

== See also ==
- Emotional Freedom Techniques
- Thought Field Therapy
