= Emotional Freedom Techniques =

Form of pseudoscientific counseling intervention

Alternative medicine
- Claims: Tapping on "meridian points" on the body, derived from acupuncture, can release "energy blockages" that cause "negative emotions"
- Related fields: Acupuncture, Acupressure, Energy medicine
- Year proposed: 1993
- Original proponents: Gary Craig
- Subsequent proponents: Jack Canfield, Nick Ortner, Joseph Mercola
- See also: Thought Field Therapy, Tapas Acupressure Technique, Eye movement desensitization and reprocessing

Emotional Freedom Techniques (EFT) is a technique that stimulates acupressure points by pressuring, tapping or rubbing while focusing on situations that represent personal fear or trauma. EFT draws on various theories of alternative medicine – including acupuncture, neuro-linguistic programming, energy medicine, and Thought Field Therapy (TFT). EFT also combines elements of exposure therapy, cognitive behavioral therapy and somatic stimulation. It is best known through Gary Craig's EFT Handbook, published in the late 1990s, and related books and workshops by a variety of teachers. EFT and similar techniques are often discussed under the umbrella term "energy psychology".

Advocates claim that the technique may be used to treat a wide variety of physical and psychological disorders, and as a simple form of self-administered therapy. The Skeptical Inquirer describes the foundations of EFT as "a hodgepodge of concepts derived from a variety of sources, [primarily] the ancient Chinese philosophy of chi, which is thought to be the 'life force' that flows throughout the body." The existence of this life force is "not empirically supported".

EFT has no benefit as a therapy beyond the placebo effect or any known effective psychological techniques that may be provided in addition to the purported "energy" technique. It is generally characterized as pseudoscience, and it has not garnered significant support in clinical psychology.

== Process ==
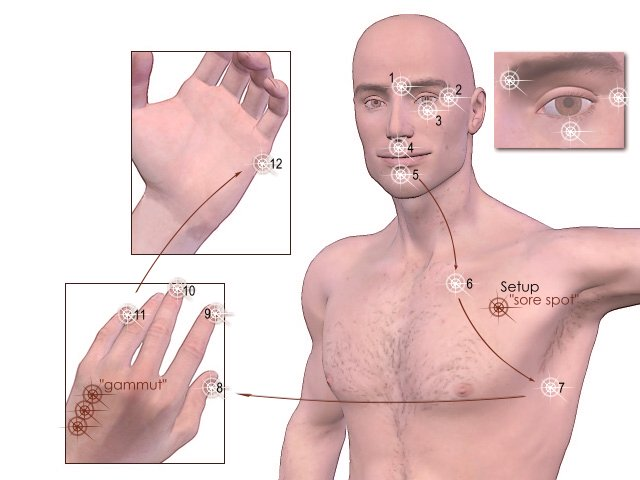
EFT-tapping points

During a typical EFT session, the person will focus on a specific issue while tapping on "end points of the body's energy meridians." EFT tapping exercises combine elements of cognitive restructuring and exposure techniques with acupoint stimulation. The technique instructs individuals to tap on meridian endpoints of the body – such as the top of the head, eye brows, under eyes, side of eyes, chin, collar bone, and under the arms. While tapping, they recite specific phrases that target an emotional component of a physical symptom.

According to the EFT Manual, the procedure consists of the participant rating the emotional intensity of their reaction on a Subjective Units of Distress Scale (SUDS) – i.e., a Likert scale for subjective measures of distress, calibrated 0 to 10 – then repeating an orienting affirmation while rubbing or tapping specific points on the body. Some practitioners incorporate eye movements or other tasks. The emotional intensity is then rescored and repeated until no changes are noted in the emotional intensity.

== Mechanism ==
Proponents of EFT and other similar treatments believe that tapping/stimulating acupuncture points provide the basis for significant improvement in psychological problems. However, the theory and mechanisms underlying the supposed effectiveness of EFT have "no evidentiary support" "in the entire history of the sciences of biology, anatomy, physiology, neurology, physics, or psychology." Researchers have described the theoretical model for EFT as "frankly bizarre" and "pseudoscientific." One review noted that one of the highest quality studies found no evidence that the location of tapping points made any difference, and attributed effects to well-known psychological mechanisms, including distraction and breathing therapy.

An article in the Skeptical Inquirer argued that there is no plausible mechanism to explain how the specifics of EFT could add to its effectiveness, and they have been described as unfalsifiable and therefore pseudoscientific. Evidence has not been found for the existence of meridians.

== Research quality ==
EFT has no useful effect as a therapy beyond the placebo effect or any known-effective psychological techniques that may be used with the purported "energy" technique, but proponents of EFT have published material claiming otherwise. Their work, however, is flawed and hence unreliable: high-quality research has never confirmed that EFT is effective.

A 2009 review found "methodological flaws" in research studies that had reported "small successes" for EFT and the related Tapas Acupressure Technique. The review concluded that positive results may be "attributable to well-known cognitive and behavioral techniques that are included with the energy manipulation. Psychologists and researchers should be wary of using such techniques, and make efforts to inform the public about the ill effects of therapies that advertise miraculous claims."

There is no good evidence EFT has any benefit for the treatment of young people with PTSD. A 2016 systematic review found that EFT was effective in reducing anxiety compared to controls, but also called for more research to establish the relative efficacy to that of established treatments.

A 2025 systematic review found that EFT reduced PTSD symptoms compared with control conditions, with effects maintained at three months. The authors suggested that EFT's effectiveness may stem from techniques it shares with cognitive and exposure therapies.

== Reception ==
A Delphi poll of an expert panel of psychologists rated EFT on a scale describing how discredited EFT has been in the field of psychology. On average, this panel found EFT had a score of 3.8 on a scale from 1.0 to 5.0, with 3.0 meaning "possibly discredited" and a 4.0 meaning "probably discredited." A book examining pseudoscientific practices in psychology characterized EFT as one of a number of "fringe psychotherapeutic practices," and a psychiatry handbook states EFT has "all the hallmarks of pseudoscience."

EFT, along with its predecessor, Thought Field Therapy, has been dismissed with warnings to avoid their use by publications such as The Skeptic's Dictionary and Quackwatch.

Proponents of EFT and other energy psychology therapies have been "particularly interested" in seeking "scientific credibility" despite the implausible proposed mechanisms for EFT. A 2008 review by energy psychology proponent David Feinstein concluded that energy psychology was a potential "rapid and potent treatment for a range of psychological conditions." However, this work by Feinstein has been widely criticized. One review criticized Feinstein's methodology, noting he ignored several research papers that did not show positive effects of EFT, and that Feinstein did not disclose his conflict of interest as an owner of a website that sells energy psychology products such as books and seminars, contrary to the best practices of research publication.

Another review criticized Feinstein's conclusion, which was based on research of weak quality and instead concluded that any positive effects of EFT are due to the more traditional psychological techniques rather than any putative "energy" manipulation. A book published on the subject of evidence-based treatment of substance abuse called Feinstein's review "incomplete and misleading" and an example of a poorly performed evidence-based review of research.

Feinstein published another review in 2012, concluding that energy psychology techniques "consistently demonstrated strong effect sizes and other positive statistical results that far exceed chance after relatively few treatment sessions." This review was also criticized, where again it was noted that Feinstein dismissed higher quality studies which showed no effects of EFT, in favor of methodologically weaker studies which did show a positive effect.

In response to a literature review by D. Feinstein on "Manual Stimulation of Acupuncture Points", published in 2023 in the Journal of Psychotherapy Integration, Cassandra L. Bonessa, Rory Pfundb, and David F. Tolin publish, in the same journal, a critical analysis of 3 meta-analyses highlighted by this study. By using the AMSTAR2 analysis criteria, they come to the conclusion that these were poorly carried out and that their quality is “Critically low”. The three researchers call EFT pseudo-science and an “unsinkable rubber duck”.
