= Thought Field Therapy =

Fringe psychological treatment recognized as a pseudoscience

Alternative medicine
- Claims: Tapping on meridian points on the body, derived from acupuncture, can release energy blockages that cause negative emotions.
- Related fields: Acupuncture, acupressure
- Year proposed: 1980s
- Original proponents: Roger Callahan
- See also: Tapas Acupressure Technique, Emotional Freedom Techniques

Thought Field Therapy (TFT) is a fringe psychological treatment developed by American psychologist Roger Callahan. Its proponents say that it can heal a variety of mental and physical ailments through specialized "tapping" with the fingers at meridian points on the upper body and hands. The theory behind TFT is a mixture of concepts "derived from a variety of sources. Foremost among these is the ancient Chinese philosophy of chi, which is thought to be the 'life force' that flows throughout the body". Callahan also bases his theory upon applied kinesiology and physics. There is no scientific evidence that TFT is effective, and the American Psychological Association has stated that it "lacks a scientific basis" and consists of pseudoscience.

== Theory and treatment ==
Callahan terms his treatment "Thought Field Therapy" because he theorizes that when a person thinks about an experience or thought associated with an emotional problem, they are tuning into a "thought field." He describes this field as "the most fundamental concept in the TFT system," stating that it "creates an imaginary, though quite real scaffold, upon which we may erect our explanatory notions".

Perturbations are said to be precisely encoded information contained in the thought field; each deformation of a person's thought field is connected to a particular problem, and is activated by thinking about that problem. Callahan maintains that these perturbations are the root cause of negative emotions and that each perturbation corresponds to a meridian point on the body. In order to eliminate the emotional upset, Callahan says that a precise sequence of meridian points must be tapped. He posits that tapping unblocks or balances the flow of qi.

Callahan states that the process can relieve a wide variety of psychological issues, including post-traumatic stress disorder, depression, anxiety, addiction, and phobia. A typical treatment session lasts up to fifteen minutes, and is not repeated. Callahan has also stated that TFT can treat or prevent physical problems, including atrial fibrillation. In 1985 in his first book on TFT, he wrote that specific phobias could be cured in as little as five minutes.

Callahan also asserts that his most advanced level, Voice Technology (VT), can be performed over the phone using an undisclosed "technology". Training for the advanced VT is provided by Callahan. The fee listed on Callahan's website for this training is $5,000. Thought Field Therapy in the media: a critical analysis of one exemplar.

== Assessments and critiques ==
There is concern by clinical psychologists of the adoption of TFT as an unvalidated and pseudoscientific therapy by government bodies and the public at large.

In 2000, an article was published in the Skeptical Inquirer which argued that there is no plausible mechanism to explain how TFT could work, and described it as a baseless pseudoscience.

A 2006 Delphi poll of psychologists on discredited therapies, published in an APA journal, indicated that on average, participants rated TFT as "probably discredited". The sample included both practicing clinical psychologists and academic psychologists. Devilly states that there is no evidence for the claimed efficacy of power therapies including TFT, Emotional Freedom Techniques, and others such as Neuro-Linguistic Programming, and they all exhibit the characteristics of pseudoscience. Lilienfeld, Lynn & Lohr also use TFT as an example of a therapy that contains some of the hallmark indicators of a pseudoscience. Specifically, they note its evasion of the peer review system and absence of boundary conditions.

Previous studies performed on TFT have received criticism in the medical literature. For example, an exploratory study done by Charles Figley, a psychologist who endeavored to find more effective treatments for post-traumatic stress disorder (PTSD). He examined four novel therapies with a six-month follow-up evaluation (using measures that were not used immediately post treatment) and did not conduct statistical significance testing to compare the therapies. The authors stated that "In contrast to conventional psychotherapy research, the SCD methodology is not meant to compare the various treatments, and thus does not necessarily meet the criteria proposed for empirically validated treatments, although it does meet some of those criteria," and also stated that "Unfortunately, because of problems with client screening and data collection, the study fell short of reaching its goals. Moreover, the nature of the study precludes comparison of the approaches, and such a comparison was never planned."

The authors also noted that because they did not prescreen participants for PTSD, not all participants necessarily met the criteria for PTSD. The authors acknowledged that the study of TFT and the other three methods were incomplete, and noted that "these treatment approaches appear to be promising in helping clients remove the most painful aspects of their traumatic memories." The authors noted that all four approaches warranted further study.

A controlled study on Thought Field Therapy Voice Technology published in the peer reviewed journal The Scientific Review of Mental Health Practice, which showed no difference between the TFT VT and randomly selected tapping sequences, which provides evidence against Callahan's assertion that precise sequences derived from his claimed specialized technology make a difference in result.

Much evidence adduced in support of TFT by Callahan and other proponents comes from uncontrolled case reports that were not peer reviewed. For example, Diepold and Goldstein demonstrated that TFT altered the brain patterns of a single traumatized subject.

In 2001, in an unprecedented move, the Editor of the Journal of Clinical Psychology agreed to publish, without peer review, five articles on TFT of Callahan's choosing; these were: Callahan, 2001b and 2001c; Pignotti & Steinberg, 2001; Sakai et al., 2001; and Johnson et al., 2001. In lieu of peer review, critiques were published alongside each article.

The critics agreed that each of the five studies contained serious flaws that rendered them uninterpretable by them. They pointed out flaws which included: selecting only successful cases; focusing on a diversity of problems; failure to use a control group; failure to control for placebo effect, demand characteristics and regression to the mean; lack of valid assessment measures; use of the SUD as the only measure of efficacy other than HRV(Heart Rate Variability); using an out of context physiological measure (HRV) in an inappropriate manner; and lack of a credible theory. One of the critics, Harvard psychology professor Richard J. McNally, noting the lack of evidence for TFT, stated that “Until Callahan has done his homework, psychologists are not obliged to pay any attention to TFT.” Psychologist John Kline wrote that Callahan's article “represents a disjointed series of unsubstantiated assertions, ill-defined neologisms, and far-fetched case reports that blur boundaries between farce and expository prose”.

One of the original authors of the non-peer reviewed studies later retracted her conclusions and has reversed her earlier favorable position on TFT. The only other studies adduced in support of TFT are ones that were reported on in Callahan's newsletter, The Thought Field, and an uncontrolled study on Voice Technology consisting of radio show call-ins in a proprietary archive of a journal of collected papers on applied kinesiology. Callahan's claims about the TFT Voice Technology having unique properties and being on a par with hard science were not supported in a controlled experiment that used random sequences vs. TFT Voice Technology.

== See also ==
- Acupuncture
- Emotional Freedom Techniques
- Eye movement desensitization and reprocessing
- Tapas Acupressure Technique

== Sources ==
- Callahan, R.J. (1996). The Case of Mary. Traumatology 3(5), Article 5.
- Callahan, R.J. (2001b). The impact of thought field therapy on heart rate variability (HRV). Journal of Clinical Psychology. 57 (10), 1153-1170 (Not Peer Reviewed).
- Callahan, R.J. (2001c). Raising and lowering heart rate variability: Some clinical findings of Thought Field Therapy. Journal of Clinical Psychology. 57 (10), 1175-1186 (Not Peer Reviewed).
- Carbonell, J.L. & Figley, C. (1999). A systematic clinical demonstration of promising PTSD treatment approaches. Traumatology, 5(1), Article 4. Available: http://www.fsu.edu/~trauma/promising.html
- Devilly, Grant J. Source: Australian and New Zealand Journal of Psychiatry, June 2005, vol. 39, no. 6, pp. 437–445(9)
- Gaudiano, B. A., & Herbert, J. D. (2000a, July/August). Can we really tap our problems away?: A critical analysis of Thought Field Therapy. Skeptical Inquirer, 24, 29–36. Available: http://www.csicop.org/si/show/can_we_really_tap_our_problems_away_a_critical_analysis_of_thought_field_th/
- Herbert, J.D. & Gaudiano, B.A. (2001). The search for the holy grail: Heart Rate Variability and Thought Field Therapy. Journal of Clinical Psychology, 57(10), 1207–1214. Available: http://www.psychology.drexel.edu/papers/herbert-holygrail.pdf
- Hooke, W. (1998). A review of Thought Field Therapy. Traumatology, 3(2), Article 3. Available online: https://web.archive.org/web/20060617085754/http://www.fsu.edu/~trauma/v3i2art3.html .
- Kline, J.P. (2001). Heart Rate Variability does not tap putative efficacy of Thought Field Therapy. Journal of Clinical Psychology. 57 (10), 1187–1192.
- Lilienfeld, SO, Lynn, SJ, Lohr JM (eds) (2003). Science and Pseudoscience in Clinical Psychology. New York: Guilford Press.
- McNally, R.J. (2001). Tertullian's motto and Callahan's method. Journal of Clinical Psychology, 57(10) 1171–1174.
- Norcross, J.C., Garofalo, A., Koocher, G.P. (2006). Discredited Psychological Treatments and Tests: A Delphi Poll, Professional Psychology: Research and Practice, 37(5), 515–522.
- Waite, W.L. & Holder, M.D. (2003). Assessment of the Emotional Freedom Technique: An Alternative Treatment for Fear. Scientific Review of Mental Health Practice, 2 (2), 20–26.
