= Professional practice of behavior analysis =

Domain of behavior analysis

The professional practice of behavior analysis is a domain of behavior analysis, the others being radical behaviorism, experimental analysis of behavior and applied behavior analysis. The practice of behavior analysis is the delivery of interventions to consumers that are guided by the principles of radical behaviorism and the research of both experimental and applied behavior analysis. Professional practice seeks to change specific behavior through the implementation of these principles. In many states, practicing behavior analysts hold a license, certificate, or registration. In other states, there are no laws governing their practice and, as such, the practice may be prohibited as falling under the practice definition of other mental health professionals. This is rapidly changing as behavior analysts are becoming more and more common.

The professional practice of behavior analysis is a hybrid discipline with specific influences coming from counseling, psychology, education, special education, communication disorders, physical therapy and criminal justice. As a discipline it has its own conferences, organizations, certification processes, and awards.

== Defining the scope of practice ==
The Behavior Analysis Certification Board (BACB) defines behavior analysis as:

The field of behavior analysis grew out of the scientific study of principles of learning and behavior. It has two main branches: experimental and applied behavior analysis. The experimental analysis of behavior (EAB) is the basic science of this field and has over many decades accumulated a substantial and well-respected research literature. This literature provides the scientific foundation for applied behavior analysis (ABA), which is both an applied science that develops methods of changing behavior and a profession that provides services to meet diverse behavioral needs. Briefly, professionals in applied behavior analysis engage in the specific and comprehensive use of principles of learning, including operant and respondent learning, in order to address behavioral needs of widely varying individuals in diverse settings. Examples of these applications include: managing behavior of children in school settings; enhancing the abilities, and choices of children and adults with different kinds of disabilities; training animals; and augmenting the performance and satisfaction of employees in organizations and businesses.

Another source defines it as, "a scientific approach to understanding why we do what we do. It focuses on how environmental factors, like consequences and context, influence and shape human and animal behavior. It has two main branches: a basic science called the Experimental Analysis of Behavior (EAB) and an applied field called Applied Behavior Analysis (ABA), which is used to create positive, meaningful behavior change in the real world." It is focused on the relationship between behavior and the environment, stating that actions are learned through consequences.

Behavior analysis is based on the principles of operant and respondent conditioning. Applied behavior analysis (ABA) includes the use of behavior management, behavioral engineering and behavior therapy.

Currently in the U.S. some behavior analysts at the masters level are licensed; others work with an international certification where licenses are unavailable, although this may not be allowed in some states or jurisdictions. At the doctoral level many are licensed as psychologists with diplomate status in behavioral psychology or licensed as licensed behavior analysts. Diplomate status alone, however, does not allow one to practice in every state and each state's regulatory statute must be reviewed for the appropriateness and legality of practice.

=== Certification ===
The Behavior Analyst Certification Board (BACB) offers a technical certificate in behavior analysis. The American Psychological Association offers a diplomate (post PhD and licensed certification) in behavioral psychology.

=== The meaning of certification ===
BACB is a private non-profit organization without governmental powers to regulate behavior analytic practice. However, it does wield the power to suspend or revoke certification from those certified if they violate the strict ethical guidelines of practice. As many states are without a licensure act, this has been sufficient to deter violators as it removes their ability to vendor with the state, schools, and insurance companies under that certification. While the BACB certification means that candidates have satisfied entry-level requirements in behavior analytic training, certificants are able to practice independently within the scope of their practice and training. Thus, a BCBA (such as those who go into marketing, engineering, or other approved fields in which BCBAs work) who has never trained to work nor worked with autistic children are discouraged to do so independently. Most health insurance companies also recognize the BCBA credential as one conferring the capability and the right to practice independently in many states (including California with the passage of SB 946 into law).

Some states still require certificants to be licensed by their respective jurisdictions for independent practice when treating behavioral health or medical problems, and a number of states including Arizona and Nevada have created a specific BCBA licensing program. Licensed certificants must operate within the scope of their license and within their areas of expertise. Where the government regulates behavior analytic services, unlicensed certificants may be supervised by a licensed professional and operate within the scope of their supervisor's license when treating disorders if that jurisdiction allows such supervision. Unlicensed certificants who provide behavior analytic training for educational or optimal performance purposes do not require licensed supervision, unless the law or precedent prohibits such practice. Where the government does not regulate the treatment of medical or psychological disorders certificants should practice in accord with the laws of their state, province, or country. All certificants must practice within their personal areas of expertise.

=== Licensure ===
The model licensing act for behavior analysts has been revised several times to reflect best practices and policy. Previous versions included provisions that would have made it in practice more difficult to obtain the necessary experiential hours for license and independent practice as a clinical psychologist.

Once the person is licensed, public protection is still monitored by the licensing board as well as the BACB, both of which make sure that the person receives sufficient ongoing education, and the BACB and licensing board investigate ethical complaints. In February 2008, Indiana, Arizona, Massachusetts, Vermont, Oklahoma and other states now have legislation pending to create licensure for behavior analysts. Pennsylvania was the first state in 2008 to license behavior specialists to cover behavior analysts. Arizona, less than three weeks later, became the first state to license behavior analysts. Other states such as Nevada and Wisconsin have also passed behavior analytic licensure.

In California, after the defeat of a bill to create a license for BCBAs in 2011, the state government instead passed SB 946 which mandates that all non-governmental insurance agencies reimburse for BCBA for behavior therapy in treating autism, starting in 2012. Unlike many other bills mandating that autism be covered by insurance, SB 946 does not currently impose a cap on services by age or funding amount – in this it is similar to other treatments such as those for heart attacks or other chronic conditions.

== Service delivery models ==
=== Definitions ===
Behavior analytic services can be and often are delivered through various treatment modalities. These include:

- Consultation – an indirect model in which the consultant works with the consultee to change the behavior of the client.
- Therapy – (individual, group, or family) in which the therapist works directly with a person with some form of pathology to lessen the pathology.
- Counseling – where the counselor works directly with a person who has problems but no pathology.
- Coaching – in which the coach works with a person to achieve a life goal.

=== Primary methods ===
The two primary methods for delivering behavior analytic services are consultation and/or direct therapy; the former involves three parties: consultant, consultee and a client whose behavior is changed (who may or may not be present for all meetings).

Consultation can involve working with the consultee (i.e., a parent or teacher) to build a plan around the behavior of a client (i.e., a child or student), or training the consultees themselves to modify the behavior of the client. Within the domain of parent–child consultation, standard intervention includes teaching parents skills such as basic reinforcement, time-out and how to manipulate different factors to modify behavior.

Direct therapy involves the relationship of behavior analyst and client, usually one-on-one, in which the analyst is responsible for directly modifying the behavior of their client. Direct therapy is also used in schools but can also be found in group homes, in a behavior modification facility and in behavior therapy (where the focus may be on tasks such as quitting smoking, modifying behaviors for sex offenders or other types of offenders, modifying behaviors related to mood disorders) or to encourage job seeking behavior in psychiatric patients.

=== History of behavior models ===
Two older and less used models still exist for the delivery of behavior analytic services. These models were used mostly with normal or typically developing populations. These two models are the Behavioral Coaching and the Behavioral Counseling model. Both were very popular in the 1960s–1980s but have recently seen a decline in popularity, as proponents argued the merits of holding strictly to learning theory. The Association for Behavior Analysis International still retains a special interest group in behavioral counseling and coaching.

=== History of behavioral counseling ===
Behavioral counseling was very popular throughout the 1970s and at least into the early 1980s. Behavioral counseling is an active action–oriented approach that works with the typically developing population but also assists people with specific/discrete problems such as career decision making, drinking, smoking or rehabilitation after injury.

=== Life coaching ===
The behavioral coaching model is sometimes referred to as life coaching. However, like counselors and psychologists, life coaches can have varied orientations/change theories (see behavioral change theories). Behavioral life coaches operate mainly from a behavior analytic orientation. Unlike therapy, this model is applied to people who desire to achieve a specific goal such as increasing their assertiveness with others. This model is educational and is usually presented as an alternative to therapy. Coaches use behavioral techniques such as objective setting, goal setting, self-control training and behavioral activation to help clients achieve specific life goals. Behavioral coaching was sometimes used to teach job skills to people having intellectual disability or head injury. In this area the model made extensive use of task analysis, direct instruction, role play, reinforcement and error correction. Often this approach employs techniques of direct instruction.

=== Goal of increasing reinforcement ===
Behavioral counseling was largely seen as a growth model that tried to increase the individual's sense of "freedom" by helping the client reduce punishment or coercion in their lives, build skills, and increase access to reinforcement. B.F. Skinner created a video discussing the processes involved and the importance of reinforcement to increase the sense of "freedom". Behavioral counseling attempts to use in-session reinforcement to improve decision-making, functional assessment of the client's problem, and behavioral interventions to reduce problem behaviors.

=== Social learning in behavioral counseling ===
Some behavioral counselors approach therapy from a social learning perspective but many held a position based on the use of behavioral psychology with a focus on the use of operant, respondent conditioning procedures. Some who did adopt a position on modeling held closer to the behavioral view of modeling as generalized imitation developed through learning processes.

=== Weight loss ===
The behavioral counseling approach became very popular in weight reduction and is on the American Psychological Association's list of evidence-based practices for weight loss. Behavioral counseling for weight loss by Richard B. Stuart led to the commercial program Weight Watchers. Recently, efforts have been made to resurrect interest in behavioral counseling as a method to effectively deliver services to normal problemed populations.

== Treatment of autism ==
Among the available approaches to treating autism, early intensive behavioral interventions (EIBIs) have been used to promote social and language development and to reduce behaviors that interfere with learning and cognitive functioning. Such therapies also aim to increase intellectual skills and adaptive functioning. Behavior therapists are continuing to develop models of social skills.

=== Therapy qualifications ===
These are generally treatments based on applied behavior analysis (ABA) and involve intensive training of the therapists, extensive time spent in ABA therapy (20–40 hours per week) and weekly supervision by experienced clinical supervisors—known as board certified behavior analysts. ABA therapy often employs principles of overlearning to help acquire mastery and fluency of skills.

=== Autistic children ===
The ABA approach attempts to teach skills such as appropriate play, which behavioral psychologists believe to be a precursor to social interaction and engagement with the world and others. It also aims to increase appropriate social, motor, verbal, and reasoning skills as well as the ability to self-regulate. ABA therapy is used to teach behaviors to autistic individuals who may not otherwise observe these behaviors spontaneously through imitation.

In recent years the ABA approach has been criticized by members of the autistic community. Many have reported suffering from post-traumatic stress disorder as a result of being forced to comply with training procedures.

=== Imitation ===
Imitation can also be directly trained. ABA therapies teach these skills through use of behavioral observation and reinforcement or prompting to teach each step of a behavior.

=== Research and treatments ===
Some research exists to show that behavior analysis is an effective treatment for autism with many studies showing its effectiveness with persons of all ages in enhancing functioning, building skills and independence as well as improving life quality. ABA has been criticized for sometimes claiming to "cure autism". This controversy exists because behavior analysis is used to alter rates of behavior, and not the condition of "autism." Nonetheless, behavior analysis is used to treat the behaviors of many in the autistic population. While several small studies exist showing that behavior analysis holds promise in this area, the number of well-controlled studies do not rise to the level required by the American Psychological Association to hold the treatment as empirically supported in this area.

An increasing amount of research in the field of applied behavior analysis (ABA) is concerned with autism; and it is a common misconception that behavior analysts work almost exclusively with autistic individuals and that ABA is synonymous with discrete trials teaching. ABA principles can also be used with a range of typical or atypical individuals whose issues vary from developmental delays, significant behavioral problems or undesirable habits.

According to practitioners, curriculums should carefully task analyze the skill(s) needed to be learned and then ensure that proper tool skills have been taught before the skill itself is attempted to be taught. Properly performed, applied behavior analysis should be done in both artificial (table) and natural environments depending on the student's progress and needs. Once a student has mastered a skill at the table the team should move the student into a natural environment for further training and generalization of the skill.

Frequently standardized assessments such as the Assessment of Basic Language and Learning Skills (ABLLS) is used to create a baseline of the learner's functional skill set. The ABLLS breaks down the learner's strengths and weaknesses to best tailor the applied behavior analysis curriculum to them. By focusing on the exact skills that need help the teacher does not teach a skill the student knows. This can also prevent student frustration at attempting a skill for which they are not ready.

Many families have fought school districts for such programs.

=== Discrete trials ===
Discrete trials were originally used by people studying classical conditioning to demonstrate stimulus–stimulus pairing. Discrete trials are often contrasted with free operant procedures, like ones used by B.F. Skinner in learning experiments with rats and pigeons, to show how learning was influenced by rates of reinforcement. The discrete trials method was adapted as a therapy for developmentally delayed children and individuals with autism. For example, Ole Ivar Lovaas used discrete trials to teach autistic children skills including making eye contact, following simple instructions, advanced language and social skills. These discrete trials involved breaking a behavior into its most basic functional unit and presenting the units in a series.

A discrete trial usually consists of the following: the antecedent, the behavior of the student and a consequence. If the student's behavior matches what is desired the consequence is something positive: food, candy, a game, praise, etc. If the behavior was not correct the teacher offers the correct answer then repeats the trial possibly with more prompting, if needed, and may also use aversives.

There is usually an inter-trial interval that allows for a few seconds to separate each trial to allow the student to process the information, teach the student to wait and make the onset of the next trial more discrete. Discrete trials can be used to develop most skills which includes cognitive, verbal communication, play, social and self-help skills. There is a carefully laid out procedure for error correction and a problem solving model to use if the program gets stuck. Discrete trial is sometimes referred to as the Lovaas technique. Discrete trials have been helpful in the treatment of pediatric feeding problems as well as in the prevention of feeding problems.

=== Free operant procedures ===
In language training, many free operant procedures emerged in the late 1960s and early 1970s. These procedures did not try to train discrimination first, and then passively wait for generalization, but instead worked from the start on actively promoting generalization.<ref>Stokes, T.F. & Baer, D.M. (1977). "An implicit technology of generalization". Journal of Applied Behavior Analysis. 10 (2): 349–367. doi:10.1901/jaba.1977.10-349. PMC 1311194. PMID 16795561.</ref> Initially the model was referred to as incidental teaching but later was called milieu language teaching and finally natural language teaching. Peterson (2007) completed a comprehensive review of 57 studies on these training procedures. This review found that 84% of the studies of the natural language procedures looked at maintenance and 94% looked at generalization and were able to provide direct support of its occurrence as part of the training.

== Other applications of applied behavior analysis ==
=== Clinical behavior analysis ===
Clinical behavior analysis highlights the application of behavior analysis to adult outpatients. Michael Dougher identified four comprehensive behavior analytic programs: Steven Hayes and others' acceptance and commitment therapy (ACT), Jacobson and others' behavioral activation (BA), Kohlenberg and Tsai's functional analytic psychotherapy, exposure therapies (i.e., systematic desensitization), and the community reinforcement approach for treating addictions. In addition, the book highlights several recent areas of functional analysis research for common clinical problems. Many of these areas are specified in the section on behavior therapy.

=== Community reinforcement approach and family training ===
The study of behavioral factors related to addictions has a long history. The community reinforcement approach has considerable research supporting it as efficacious. Started in the 1970s by Nathan H. Azrin and his graduate student Hunt, the community reinforcement approach is a comprehensive operant program built on a functional assessment of a client's drinking behavior and the use of positive reinforcement and contingency management for nondrinking. When combined with disulfiram (an aversive procedure) community reinforcement showed remarkable effects. One component of the program that appears to be particularly strong is the non-drinking club. Applications of community reinforcement to public policy have become the recent focus of this approach.

An offshoot of the community reinforcement approach is the community reinforcement approach and family training. This program is designed to help family members of substance abusers feel empowered to engage in treatment. The rates of success have varied somewhat by study but seem to cluster around 70%. The program uses a variety of interventions based on functional assessment including a module to prevent domestic violence. Partners are trained to use positive reinforcement, various communication skills and natural consequences.

=== Children with disruptive disorders and parenting ===
With children, applied behavior analysis provides the core of the positive behavior support movement and creates the basis of Teaching-Family Model homes. Teaching-Family homes have been found to reduce recidivism for delinquent youths both while they are in the homes and after they leave. Operant procedures form the basis of behavioral parent training developed from social learning theorists. The etiological models for antisocial behavior show considerable correlation with negative reinforcement and response matching. Behavioral parent training or Parent Management Training has been very successful in the treatment of conduct disorders in children and adolescents with recent research focusing on making it more culturally sensitive. In addition, behavioral parent training has been shown to reduce corporal or abusive child discipline tactics. Behavior analysts typically adhere to a behavioral model of child development in their practice (see child development).

=== Recidivism ===
Recent studies showing that behavior analysis can reduce recidivism have led to a resurgence in behavior therapy facilities. Of particular interest has been the growing research on the Teaching-Family Model which was developed by Montrose Wolf and reduces recidivism rates. In addition, behaviorally-based early intervention programs have shown effectiveness.

=== Exposure therapy ===
Methods of counter-conditioning and respondent extinction, called exposure therapy, are often employed by many behavior therapists in the treatment of phobias, anxiety disorders such as post-traumatic stress disorder (PTSD), and addictions (cue exposure). Prolonged exposure therapy has been particularly helpful with PTSD. Several procedures to block respondent conditioning such as blocking and overshadowing are sometimes used in behavioral medicine to prevent conditioned taste aversion for patients with chemotherapy treatments. Exposure with Response Prevention (ERP) is a respondent extinction procedure often used to treat obsessive–compulsive behavior. Escape response blocking is critical for this procedure. For PTSDs exposure therapy is one of the few evidence-based techniques. Recent research suggests exposure therapy is an excellent means of alleviating both the anxiety and cognitive symptoms specific to PTSD with no additive effect for additional cognitive components. Several authors have argued that exposure by itself is necessary and sufficient to produce behavior change in reducing fear in social phobics and helping them engage more effectively with others. The Washington Post ran a story that only exposure therapy is proven for PTSD and that cognitive therapy or even drug therapy are not shown at this time to be effective.

=== Operant-based EEG biofeedback ===
Kamiya (1968) demonstrated that the alpha rhythm in humans could be operantly conditioned. He published an influential article in Psychology Today that summarized research showing subjects learn to discriminate when alpha was present or absent, and that they could use feedback to shift the dominant alpha frequency about 1 Hz. Almost half of his subjects reported experiencing a pleasant "alpha state" characterized as an "alert calmness". These reports may have contributed to the perception of alpha biofeedback as a shortcut to a meditative state. He also studied the electroencephalography (EEG) correlates of meditative states. Operant conditioning of EEG has had considerable support in many areas including attention deficit hyperactivity disorder (ADHD) and even seizure disorders. Early studies of the procedure included the treatment of seizure disorders. Luber and colleagues (1981) conducted a double blind crossover study showing that seizure activity decreased by 50% in the contingent conditioning of inhibiting brain waves as opposed to the non-contingent use. Sterman (2000) reviewed 18 studies of a total of 174 clients and found 82% of the participants had significant seizure reduction (30% less weekly seizures).

=== Organizational ===
Behavior analysis with organizations is sometimes combined with systems theory in an approach called organizational behavior management. This approach has shown success particularly in the area of behavior-based safety. Behavior safety research has lately become focused on factors that lead programs to being retained in institutions long after the designer leaves.

=== Educational ===
Direct instruction and Direct Instruction: the former representing the process and the latter a specific curriculum that highlights that process remain both current and controversial in behavior analysis. The essential features are a carefully structured fast-paced program based on teacher-directed small group instruction. One controversy that remains is that teacher creativity is admonished in the program. Even with such issues to be worked out positive gains in reading for the approach have been reported in the literature since 1968. An example of the positive gains reported by Meyer (1984) found that 34% of children in the DISTAR group were accepted to college as compared to only 17% of the control school. Current research is focused on peer delivery of the program.

School-wide positive behavior support is based on the use of behavior analytic procedures delivered in an organizational behavior management approach. School-wide behavioral support has been increasingly accepted by administrators, lawmakers and teachers as a way to improve safety in classrooms.

Curriculum-based measurement and curriculum matching is another active area of application. Curriculum-based measurement uses rate and reading performance as the primary variable in determining reading levels. The goal is to better match children to the appropriate curriculum level to remove frustration as well as to track reading performance over time to see if it is improving with intervention. This model also serves as the basis for response to intervention models.

Functional behavioral assessment was mandated in the United States for children who meet criteria under the individuals with disabilities education act. This approach has precluded many procedures for modifying and maintaining children in not just the school system, but in many cases in the regular education setting. Even children with severe behavior problems appear to be helped.

Teaching children to recruit attention has become a very important area in education. In many cases one function of children's disruptive behavior is to get attention.

=== Hospital settings ===
One area of interest in hospitals is the blocking effect—especially for conditioned taste aversion. This area of interest is considered important in the prevention of weight loss during chemotherapy for cancer patients. Another area of growing interest in the hospital setting is the use of operant-based biofeedback with those suffering from cerebral palsy or minor spinal injuries.

Brucker's group at the University of Miami has had some success with specific operant conditioning-based biofeedback procedures to enhance functioning. While such methods are not a cure, and gains tend to be in the moderate range, they do show ability to help remaining central nervous system cells to regain some control over lost areas of functioning.

=== Residential treatment ===
Behavioral interventions have been very helpful in reducing problem behaviors in residential treatment centers. The type of residential versus intellectual disability does not appear to be a factor. Behavioral interventions have been found to be successful even when medication interventions fail.

=== Space program ===
Probably one of the most interesting applications of behavior analysis in the 1960s was its contribution to the space program. Research in this area is used to train astronauts including the chimpanzees sent into space. Continued work in this area focuses on ensuring that astronauts who live in confined areas and space do not develop behavioral health problems. Most of this work was led by pioneer behaviorist Joseph V. Brady.

== Consumer and professional relationships ==
Open communication and a supportive relationship between educational systems and families allow the student to receive a beneficial education. This pertains to typical learners as well as to individuals who need additional services. It was not until the 1960s that researchers began exploring behavior analysis as a method to educate those children who fall somewhere along the autism spectrum. Behavior analysts agree that consistency in and out of the school classroom is key in order for autistic children to maintain proper standing in school and continue to develop to their greatest potential.

Applied behavior analysts sometimes work with a team to address a person's educational or behavioral needs. Other professionals such as speech therapists, physicians and the primary caregivers are treated as key to the implementation of successful therapy in the applied behavior analysis (ABA) model. The ABA method relies on behavior principles to develop treatments appropriate for the individual. Regular meetings with professionals to discuss programming are one way to establish a successful working relationship between a family and their school. It is beneficial when a caregiver can conduct generalization procedures outside of school. In the ABA framework, developing and maintaining a structured working relationship between parents or guardians and professionals is essential to ensure consistent treatment.

== Intervention goals ==
When working directly with clients, behavior analysts engage in a process of collaborative goal setting. Goal setting ensures that the client is already under stimulus control of the goal and is thus more likely to engage in behavior to achieve it. Behavior analytic programs are ultimately skill building, they enhance functioning, lead to higher quality of life, and build self-control. One of the most distinguishing features of behavior analysis has been its core belief that all individuals have a right to the most effective treatment for their condition. and a right to the most effective educational strategy available.

== History ==
Applied behavior analysis is the applied side of the experimental analysis of behavior. It is based on the principles of operant and respondent conditioning and represents a major approach to behavior therapies. Its origin can be traced back to Teodoro Ayllon and Jack Michael's 1959 article "The psychiatric nurse as a behavioral engineer" as well as to initial efforts to implement teaching machines.

The research basis of ABA can be found in the theoretical work of behaviorism and radical behaviorism originating with the work of B.F. Skinner. In 1968 Baer, Wolf and Risley wrote an article that was the source of contemporary applied behavior analysis providing the criteria to judge the adequacy of research and practice in applied behavior analysis. It became the core and centerpiece behavioral engineering.

Work in respondent conditioning (what some would term classical conditioning) began with the work of Joseph Wolpe in the 1960s. It was improved by the work of Edna B Foa who did extensive research on exposure and response prevention for obsessive–compulsive disorder (OCD). In addition, she worked on exposure therapy for post-traumatic stress disorder.

Behavior analysts have conducted research in many areas: psychology, education, speech–language pathology, criminal justice, and family life. They belong to many organizations, including the American Psychological Association (APA) and the Association for Behavior Analysis International.

=== Current research ===
Behavior analysis remains one of the most active research areas in all of psychology, developmental disability, mental health and other studies of human behavior. Current research in behavior analysis focuses on expanding the tradition by looking at setting events, behavioral activation, the Matching law, relational frame theory, stimulus equivalences and covert conditioning as exemplified in Skinner's model of rule-governed behavior Verbal Behavior.

=== Experimental psychopathology ===
Experimental psychopathology is a behavior therapy area in which animal models are developed to simulate human pathology. For example, Wolpe studied cats to build his theory of human anxiety. This work continues today in the study of both pathology and treatment.

== Controversy ==
Initially, applied behavior analysis used punishment such as shouting and slaps to reduce unwanted behaviors. Ethical opposition to such aversive practices caused them to fall out of favor and has stimulated development of less aversive methods, although such practices are still occasionally used, such as at the Judge Rotenberg Center. In general, aversion therapy and punishment are now less frequently used as ABA treatments due to legal restrictions. However, procedures such as odor aversion, covert sensitization and other covert conditioning procedures, based on punishment or aversion strategies, are still used effectively in the treatment of pedophiles. In addition, with some populations such as conduct disorder in children there is considerable evidence that has developed to show that all positive programs can produce change but that children will not enter into the normal range without punishment procedures. These programs have shifted to using child time-out and response–cost procedures to ensure that clients rights to effective interventions are met.

=== Suppression of queer identity ===
In 1973 the APA removed homosexuality from its Diagnostic and Statistical Manual yet it kept "ego dystonic" homosexuality as a condition until the DSM III-R (1987). In 1974 Ole Ivar Lovaas, pioneer of the use of discrete trial teaching (DTT) to treat autism, was the second author on a journal article describing the use of ABA to reduce the "feminine" behaviors and increase the "masculine" behaviors of a child assigned male at birth in an effort to prevent them from becoming a transgender adult. Treatments designed to uphold traditional sex-role behaviors were opposed by some behavior analysts who argued that the intervention was not justified. In the late 1960s Wolpe refused to treat homosexual behavior arguing that it was easier and more productive to treat the religious guilt than the homosexuality. He instead provided assertiveness training to a homosexual client. Most behavior analysts and behavior therapists have not worked in sexual re–orientation therapy since Gerald Davison argued that the issue was not one of effectiveness but of ethics. When he wrote the paper presenting this position, Davison was president of the Association for the Advancement of Behavior Therapy, now the Association for Behavioral and Cognitive Therapies, and thus his views carried much weight. Davison argued that homosexuality is not pathological and is only a problem if it is regarded as one by society and the therapist.

== Ethical practice ==
=== Punishment and aversion therapies ===
The use of punishment and aversion therapy procedures is a constant ethical challenge for behavior analysts. One of the original reasons for the development of the Behavior Analyst Certification Board were cases of abuse from behaviorists. Both continue to draw proponents and opposition, however, in some of the more controversial cases some middle ground has been found through legislation (see Judge Rotenberg Educational Center).

=== Sex offenders and recidivism ===
A study in 1991 showed that behavior modification was effective in sex offender treatment and covert sensitization, and it has been shown to have some effects on reducing recidivism. However Gene Able, who has done extensive research in this area, suggests that it is not as effective outside of the package which contains odor aversion, satiation therapy (masturbatory reconditioning), and various social skills training programs including empathy training. Current behavior analysis programs offer this type of comprehensive treatment approach. In addition they use a combination of functional assessment, behavior chain analysis and risk assessment to create relapse prevention strategies and to help the offender to develop better self-control.

With intellectually disabled sex offenders, comprehensive behavioral programming has been effective at least in the short run. This treatment included formal academic and vocational training, sex education, a unit token economy, and individual behavior therapy including sexual reconditioning. In addition it included supported competitive employment, fading of program structure, and increased community participation.

== Journals ==
There are multiple journals which produce articles on the clinical applications of applied behavior analysis. The most popular, and widely used, of these journals is the Journal of Applied Behavior Analysis. There are many other journals dedicated to this field. Some of these include The Behavior Analyst Today, the International Journal of Behavioral Consultation and Therapy and three new journals scheduled for release in 2008: Behavior Analysis in Sports, Health, Fitness and Behavioral Medicine, the Journal of Behavior Analysis in Crime and Victim: Treatment and Prevention as well as the Association for Behavior Analysis International's Behavior Analysis in Practice.

== Professional organizations ==
The Association for Behavior Analysis International has a special interest group for practitioner issues, behavioral counseling, and clinical behavior analysis. The Association for Behavior Analysis International has larger special interest groups for autism and behavioral medicine. The Association for Behavior Analysis International sponsors multiple conferences/year, including the annual conference, annual autism conference, biannual international conference, and other conferences on specific issues such as behavioral theory and sustainability.

The Association for Behavioral and Cognitive Therapies (ABCT) also has an interest group in behavior analysis, which focuses on clinical behavior analysis. In addition, the Association for Behavioral and Cognitive Therapies has a special interest group on addictions.

Doctoral level behavior analysts who are psychologists belong to the American Psychological Association's division 25: Behavior analysis. APA offers a diplomate in behavioral psychology.
