= Behavior modification =

Psychological treatment approach using conditioning principles to change behavior

Behavior modification is a treatment approach that uses respondent and operant conditioning to change behavior. Based on methodological behaviorism, overt behavior is modified with (antecedent) stimulus control and consequences, including positive and negative reinforcement contingencies to increase desirable behavior, as well as positive and negative punishment, and extinction to reduce problematic behavior.

Contemporary applications of behavior modification include applied behavior analysis (ABA), behavior therapy, exposure therapy, and cognitive behavioral therapy. Since the inception of behavior modification, significant and substantial advancements have been made to focus on the function of behavior, choice, cultural sensitivity, compassion, equity, and quality of life (QoL). Paradigm shifts have been made since the inception of behavior modification, and these changes are focused on the dignity of the individual receiving treatment, and found in today's graduate training programs.

== Description and history ==
The first use of the term behavior modification appears to have been by Edward Thorndike in 1911. His article Provisional Laws of Acquired Behavior or Learning makes frequent use of the term "modifying behavior". Through early research in the 1940s and the 1950s the term was used by Joseph Wolpe's research group. The experimental tradition in clinical psychology used it to refer to psycho-therapeutic techniques derived from empirical research. In the 1960s, behavior modification operated on stimulus-response-reinforcement framework (S-R-S^{R}), emphasizing the concept of 'transactional' explanations of behavior. It has since come to refer mainly to techniques for increasing adaptive behavior through reinforcement and decreasing maladaptive behavior through extinction or punishment (with emphasis on the former). Furthermore, B. F. Skinner proposed the concept of reinforcement and punishment through his behaviorism theory, which suggested that humans are susceptible to changes based under reinforcement or punishment-based stimuli that can alter their behaviors. The evaluations of each of these analysts helped to shape the foundation of behavioral modification and how it can utilized to alter certain behaviors.

In recent years, the concept of punishment has had many critics, though these criticisms tend not to apply to negative punishment (time-outs) and usually apply to the addition of some aversive event. The use of positive punishment by board certified behavior analysts is restricted to extreme circumstances when all other forms of treatment have failed and when the behavior to be modified is a danger to the person or to others (see professional practice of behavior analysis). In clinical settings positive punishment is usually restricted to using a spray bottle filled with water as an aversive event. When misused, more aversive punishment can lead to affective (emotional) disorders, as well as to the receiver of the punishment increasingly trying to avoid the punishment (i.e., "not get caught").

Behavior modification can also be applied to areas of study in habitual formation and in the classroom. According to a study done in 2021, behavioral modification techniques were tested with individuals with habits and saw positive change.

Behavior modification relies on the following:

- Reinforcement (positive and negative)
- Punishment (positive and negative)
- Extinction
- Shaping
- Fading
- Chaining

The usage of techniques such as reinforcement, punishment, and extinction point to a similarity between operant conditioning and behavioral modification. Operant conditioning relies on the effects of rewards and punishment, and this can be intertwined within the confines of behavioral modification in regards to treating children in school settings.

== Areas of effectiveness ==
Functional behavior assessment forms the core of applied behavior analysis, and this technology was not part of behavior modification. A Functional Behavioral Assessment (FBA) is a systematic process used to identify the underlying causes and functions of challenging behaviors. Unlike traditional behavior modification, which often focused solely on altering the behavior itself, FBA seeks to understand the reasons behind a behavior by examining the environmental, social, and psychological factors that contribute to it. The FBA process involves several steps: defining the problematic behavior in observable and measurable terms, collecting data through direct observation, interviews, and review of records, identifying patterns and triggers, hypothesizing the function of the behavior, and developing intervention strategies based on these hypotheses.

The importance of FBA lies in its comprehensive and individualized approach. By understanding the function of a behavior, interventions can be tailored to address the root cause rather than just the symptoms. This leads to more effective and lasting behavior change. For example, if a behavior is identified as a way for an individual to escape a difficult task, the intervention might include teaching more appropriate ways to request a break or modifying the task to make it more manageable. In contrast, traditional behavior modification might only attempt to suppress the escape behavior without addressing the underlying issue, which could lead to frustration and the emergence of other problematic behaviors.

Additionally, FBA emphasizes a positive and proactive approach, focusing on teaching alternative, contextually appropriate behaviors and modifying the environment to support these behaviors design to support QoL. This stands in contrast to the often punitive nature of previous behavior modification techniques. Overall, FBA represents a more humane and effective method for understanding and addressing challenging behaviors, leading to improved outcomes for individuals.

=== People with autism spectrum disorder ===
Professionals use this science of behavior modification often with individuals with autism spectrum disorder (ASD). The purpose of behavior modification for these people is to work on increasing socially significant behavior such as academic skills, adaptive skills, social skills, and vocational skills, while decreasing problem behaviors. One of the main issues behavior modification addresses is deficits in communication skills that cause problem behaviors such as crying, screaming, falling, and hitting in those with autism.

One of the main forms of behavior modification used with people who have ASD is applied behavior analysis (ABA). Applied behavior analysis is a form of behavior modification that has a specific framework and ethical rules, and it has gained popularity in the field of psychology over the past 50 years. Applied behavior analysis can be seen an intervention that allows people with autism to gain bodily autonomy and choice making in their life, all while learning adaptive skills to become independent.One way the usage of behavior modification can teach individuals to discriminate between preferred and non preferred items and further be generalized to other areas of their life to give them control.

While behavior modification is more commonly known to be used with those with ASD, behavior modification teachings can also improve interactions between neurotypical people and people with autism. Teachings like modeling, as done in one study, found that it was able to teach typical people communication and social skills that helped them in their field of work with approaching and interacting with people who have ASD.

Although a popular treatment, newer research on ABA has questioned the evidence of its effectiveness, and suggested it may even be harmful. As autistic adults are increasingly able to publish their own perspectives on the ABA used with them as children, the predominant view among autistic adults is that ABA is abusive. This has led to discussion of non-behavioral alternatives.

=== Children with ADHD ===
For children with attention deficit hyperactivity disorder (ADHD), one study showed that over a several-year period, children in the behavior modification group had half the number of felony arrests as children in the medication group. These findings have yet to be replicated, but are considered encouraging for the use of behavior modification for children with ADHD. There is strong and consistent evidence that behavioral treatments are effective for treating ADHD. A 2008 meta-analysis found that the use of behavior modification for ADHD resulted in effect sizes in between group studies (.83), pre-post studies (.70), within group studies (2.64), and single subject studies (3.78) indicating behavioral treatments are highly effective.

=== Uncontrollable diabetes Type 2 ===
Drawing upon Bandura's self-efficacy theory, which has proven effective in programs aimed at promoting health-related behavioral modifications in adults with diabetes, various interventions have been implemented. These interventions incorporate group counseling, group discussions, and an empowerment process, all geared towards encouraging individuals to adopt healthy dietary practices, adhere to medication regimens, and engage in regular exercise, with the goal of improving glycemic levels. Notably, the outcomes of these programs have demonstrated promising advancements, with improvements observed in self-efficacy and trends towards significance in hemoglobin A1c levels.

=== Residential treatment ===
Behavior modification programs form the core of many residential treatment facility programs. They have shown success in reducing recidivism for adolescents with conduct problems and adult offenders. Though use of these facilities for adolescents is a controversial practice. One particular program that is of interest is teaching-family homes (see Teaching Family Model), which is based on a social learning model that emerged from radical behaviorism. These particular homes use a family style approach to residential treatment, which has been carefully replicated over 700 times. Recent efforts have seen a push for the inclusion of more behavior modification programs in residential re-entry programs in the U.S. to aid prisoners in re-adjusting after release.

=== Weight loss outcomes ===
Research has shown effectiveness for obese people who binge eat. One program called the Trevose Behavior Modification Program (TBMP) is an accessible self-help weight loss program that emphasizes ongoing care. TBMP, administered and directed by non-professionals, has demonstrated remarkable success in facilitating substantial and lasting weight loss. This program not only offers the advantage of being cost-effective but also provides continuous support. Notably, individuals with and without frequent binge eating have achieved significant long-term weight loss through TBMP's continuing care approach.

=== Addictions ===
One area that has repeatedly shown effectiveness has been the work of behaviorists working in the area of community reinforcement for addictions.

Behavior modification can also help those recovering from addiction to find replacement behaviors that is more functionally and equivalent to the satisfaction or need.

=== Depression ===
Another area of research that has been strongly supported has been behavioral activation for depression.

One way of giving positive reinforcement in behavior modification is in providing compliments, approval, encouragement, and affirmation; a ratio of five compliments for every one complaint is generally seen as being effective in altering behavior in a desired manner and even in producing stable marriages.

== Criticism ==
Behavior modification is critiqued in person-centered psychotherapeutic approaches such as Rogerian Counseling and Re-evaluation Counseling, which involve "connecting with the human qualities of the person to promote healing", while behaviorism is "denigrating to the human spirit". B.F. Skinner argues in Beyond Freedom and Dignity that unrestricted reinforcement is what led to the "feeling of freedom", thus removal of aversive events allows people to "feel freer". Further criticism extends to the presumption that behavior increases only when it is reinforced. This premise is at odds with research conducted by Albert Bandura at Stanford University. His findings indicate that violent behavior is imitated, without being reinforced, in studies conducted with children watching films showing various individuals "beating the daylights out of Bobo". Bandura believes that human personality and learning is the result of the interaction between environment, behavior and psychological process. There is evidence, however, that imitation is a class of behavior that can be learned just like anything else. Children have been shown to imitate behavior that they have never displayed before and are never reinforced for, after being taught to imitate in general.

Based on the early improper use of behavior modification techniques, substantial emphasis has been placed on the importance of ethics and licensure. Ethics is paramount because it ensures that practitioners prioritize the well-being, dignity, and rights of their clients. Given the vulnerable populations often served by ABA professionals, such as individuals with developmental disabilities, maintaining high ethical standards helps prevent exploitation, harm, and abuse. In today's era, The Behavior Analyst Certification Board (BACB) Code of Ethics is a comprehensive framework that guides behavior analysts in their professional conduct. For instance, Code 1.04 emphasizes the importance of integrity, urging behavior analysts to be honest and truthful in their professional dealings. Code 2.01 mandates the prioritization of client dignity and welfare, ensuring that the client's needs come first. Code 2.06 requires informed consent, meaning clients must be fully aware of and agree to the interventions used. Confidentiality is protected under Code 2.07, which ensures that all client information is kept private and secure. Additionally, Code 3.01 stresses the necessity of providing evidence-based treatments, ensuring interventions are scientifically supported and effective. By adhering to these and other ethical guidelines, behavior analysts foster trust, promote positive outcomes, and uphold the integrity of the field.

== See also ==
- Behavioural change theories
- Behavior change (public health)
- Behavior management
- Behavior therapy
- Conversion therapy
- Covert conditioning
- Decoupling for body-focused repetitive behaviors
- Habit reversal training
- Pain model of behaviour management
- Positive behavior interventions and supports
- Token economy
