= Applied behavior analysis =

Application of respondent and operant conditioning to change behavior

Applied behavior analysis (ABA), also referred to as behavioral engineering, is a psychological discipline that uses respondent and operant conditioning to change human and animal behavior. ABA is the applied form of behavior analysis; the other two are: radical behaviorism (or the philosophy of the science) and experimental analysis of behavior, which focuses on basic experimental research.

The term applied behavior analysis has replaced behavior modification because the latter approach suggested changing behavior without clarifying the relevant behavior-environment interactions. In contrast, ABA changes behavior by first assessing the functional relationship between a targeted behavior and the environment, a process known as a functional behavior assessment. Further, the approach seeks to develop socially acceptable alternatives for maladaptive behaviors, often through implementing differential reinforcement contingencies.

Although ABA is most commonly associated with autism intervention, it has been used in a range of other areas, including applied animal behavior, substance abuse, organizational behavior management, behavior management in classrooms, and acceptance and commitment therapy. ABA is controversial and rejected by the autistic rights movement due to the fact that it emphasizes normalization instead of acceptance, as well as a history of – in some forms of ABA and its predecessors – the use of aversives, such as electric shocks.

== Definition ==
ABA is an applied science devoted to developing procedures that will produce meaningful changes in behavior. It is to be distinguished from the experimental analysis of behavior, which focuses on basic research, but it uses principles developed by such research, in particular operant conditioning and classical conditioning. Both branches of behavior analysis adopt the viewpoint of radical behaviorism, treating thoughts, emotions, and other covert activity as behavior that is subject to the same responses as overt behavior. This represents a shift away from methodological behaviorism, which restricts behavior-change procedures to behaviors that are overt, and was the conceptual underpinning of behavior modification. Behavior analysts emphasize that the science of behavior must be a natural science as opposed to a social science. As such, behavior analysts focus on the observable relationship of behavior with the environment, including antecedents and consequences, without resort to "hypothetical constructs".

== History ==
The field of behaviorism originated in 1913 by John B. Watson with his seminal work Psychology as the Behaviorist Views it. In the article, Watson argued against the field of psychology's focus on consciousness and proposed that the field instead focus on observable behaviors, a concept referred to as methodological behaviorism. In the 1930s, B. F. Skinner established the concept of radical behaviorism which extended Watson's theory to encompass private events that are unobservable to others, such as thoughts and emotions. The initial experiments studying the effectiveness of behavior analysis on human subjects were published in the 1940s and '50s, including Paul Fuller's "Operant conditioning of a vegetative human organism" (1949). In 1957, the Society for Experimental Analysis of Behavior (SEAB) was founded by a group of behavioral psychologists, including Skinner and Charles Ferster, to publish a journal that focused on operant conditioning, and the following year, the first edition of the Journal of the Experimental Analysis of Behavior was published.

Teodoro Ayllon and Jack Michael's study "The psychiatric nurse as a behavioral engineer" in 1959 was the first to employ the seven dimensions of ABA, which demonstrated how effective a token economy was in altering the aberrant behavior of hospitalized patients with schizophrenia and intellectual disability. The successful results from this study led researchers at the University of Kansas to start the Journal of Applied Behavior Analysis (JABA) in 1968. A group of researchers at the University of Washington, including Donald Baer, Sidney W. Bijou, Bill Hopkins, Jay Birnbrauer, Todd Risley, and Montrose Wolf, applied the principles of behavior analysis to treat autism, manage the behavior of children and adolescents in juvenile detention centers, and organize employees who required proper structure and management in businesses. In 1968, Baer, Bijou, Risley, Birnbrauer, Wolf, and James Sherman joined the Department of Human Development and Family Life at the University of Kansas, where they founded the Journal of Applied Behavior Analysis.

From 1960 through 1997, Ivar Lovaas researched the efficacy of ABA techniques on autistic children. While Lovaas is often considered a pioneer in the field of ABA, and his work was instrumental in establishing it as an effective treatment for autism, his early use of aversives (including slapping and electric shocks) has raised considerable ethical concerns. In 2022, a major ABA trade group, the Association for Behavior Analysis International (ABAI), issued a policy statement unconditionally condemning electric-shock aversives. In 2023, the task force ABAI formed to assess the use of electric-shock aversives authored a paper in which they claimed such methods were not inherently unethical and that patients and caregivers should be permitted to opt into them to treat "severe, life-threatening behavior". ABAI has historically been criticized by members of the autistic community, including by the Autistic Self Advocacy Network (ASAN) and its leadership, for routinely platforming staff from the Judge Rotenberg Center (JRC) at its annual conferences. The JRC is the only known facility in the United States whose ABA practitioners still use electric shocks to punish autistic people in their care, a practice labeled torture by the United Nations special rapporteur on torture. After ABAI released its 2022 policy statement, ASAN called on ABAI to stop platforming JRC staff members and lobby for a federal ban on electric-shock aversives.

During the 1960s and 1970s, researchers began experimenting on the use of ABA techniques in the form of gay conversion therapy. These methodologies often involved the use of punishment procedures. Lovaas and his doctoral student George Rekers co-authored a paper titled "Behavioral treatment of deviant sex-role behaviors in a male child" in 1974. Several of Lovaas's contemporaries released criticisms of the paper shortly after its publication, and conversion therapy was formally condemned by ABAI in 2021. In 2020, JABA added an expression of concern and an editor's note to the 1974 paper, which it had originally published. The documents acknowledged the harm done by the study to its 4-year-old subject and the LGBTQ+ community at large, while also claiming the study did not violate the ethical standards of its time and could not be causally linked to the subject's suicide as an adult. Some members of academia, including Arthur Caplan (of the New York University Grossman School of Medicine) and Austin Johnson (of the University of California, Riverside's Graduate School of Education), criticized the journal for claiming the study was conducted ethically for its time and refusing to retract the paper outright.

Over the years, "behavior analysis" gradually superseded "behavior modification". Instead of simply attempting to alter maladaptive behavior, behavior analysts sought to understand the function of that behavior, what reinforcement histories (i.e., attention, escape from demands, automatic (sensory stimulation), access to tangible items or activities) promote and maintain it, and how it can be replaced by an alternative, more appropriate behavior.

== Characteristics ==
7 Characteristics of ABA (also known as 7 dimensions of ABA)

Baer, Wolf, and Risley's 1968 article is still used as the standard description of ABA. It lists the following seven characteristics of ABA. Another resource for the characteristics of applied behavior analysis is the textbook Behavior Modification: Principles and Procedures.

- Applied: ABA focuses on the social significance of the behavior studied and works to improve the lives of those receiving ABA services.
- Behavioral: ABA focuses on behavior, which is defined as the observable and measurable movements of an organism. Definitions of behavior should be written unambiguously so they can be clearly understood by a third party.
- Analytic: Behavior analysis is successful when the analyst understands and can manipulate the events that control a target behavior. This may be relatively easy to do in the lab, where a researcher is able to arrange the relevant events, but it is not always easy, or ethical, in an applied situation. In order to consider something to fall under the spectrum of analytic, it must demonstrate a functional relationship and it must be provable. Baer et al. outline two methods that may be used in applied settings to demonstrate control while maintaining ethical standards. These are the reversal design and the multiple baseline design. In the reversal design, the experimenter first measures the behavior of choice, introduces an intervention, and then measures the behavior again. Then, the intervention is removed, or reduced, and the behavior is measured yet again. The intervention is effective to the extent that the behavior changes and then changes back in response to these manipulations. The multiple baseline method may be used for behaviors that seem irreversible. Here, several behaviors are measured and then the intervention is applied to each in turn. The effectiveness of the intervention is revealed by changes in just the behavior to which the intervention is being applied.
- Technological: The description of analytic research must be clear and detailed so that any competent researcher can repeat it accurately.
- Conceptually Systematic: Behavior analysis should not simply produce a list of effective interventions; rather, intervention protocols should focus on including technological descriptions as well as theoretically meaningful terms, such as "secondary reinforcement" or "errorless discrimination", to help the reader understand how the concepts could be used in similar protocols.
- Effective: Interventions must produce behavioral changes that have a large enough effect to make meaningful, positive changes in the client's life.
- Generality: ABA intervention should focus on selecting and teaching new behaviors so the client can transfer those skills into new environments and stimuli outside of what was directly taught. Behavior analysts should incorporate plans for generalization when creating programs.

=== Other proposed characteristics ===
In 2005, Heward et al. suggested the addition of the following five characteristics:

- Accountable: ABA must be able to demonstrate that its methods are effective. This requires repeatedly measuring the effect of interventions (success, failure or no effect at all), and, if necessary, making changes that improve their effectiveness.
- Public: The methods, results, and theoretical analyses of ABA must be published and open to scrutiny. There are no hidden treatments or mystical, metaphysical explanations.
- Doable: To be generally useful, interventions should be available to a variety of individuals, who might be teachers, parents, therapists, or even those who wish to modify their own behavior. With proper planning and training, many interventions can be applied by almost anyone willing to invest the effort.
- Empowering: ABA provides tools that give the practitioner feedback on the results of interventions. These allow clinicians to assess their skill level and build confidence in their effectiveness.
- Optimistic: Behavior analysts have cause to be optimistic that their efforts are socially worthwhile, for the following reasons:
  - The behaviors impacted by behavior analysis are largely determined by learning and controlled by manipulable aspects of the environment.
  - Practitioners can improve performance by direct and continuous measurements.
  - As a practitioner uses behavioral techniques with positive outcomes, they become more confident of future success.
  - The literature provides many examples of success in teaching individuals considered previously unteachable.

== Basic principles ==
=== Operant conditioning and three-term contingency ===
Operant behavior is voluntary behavior that is sensitive to, or controlled by, its consequences. Specifically, operant conditioning refers to the three-term contingency that uses stimulus control. In the three-term contingency, a discriminative stimulus (sD) is an antecedent stimulus that first signals to the subject that reinforcement (or, less commonly, punishment) is available. Then, the subject performs a behavior. After performing a behavior, a consequence will occur that either adds (positive) or removes (negative) something that will make the behavior either occur more (reinforcement) or less (punishment) frequently in the future.

Reinforcement

Reinforcement occurs when the consequence of a behavior makes it more likely for that behavior to occur in the future. Reinforcing consequences can be either positive, where something preferred is added, or negative, where something aversive is removed. Reinforcement is the key element in operant conditioning and most behavior change programs. There are multiple schedules of reinforcement that affect the future probability of behavior.

Punishment

Punishment occurs when the consequences of a behavior make the behavior less likely to occur in the future. As with reinforcement, a stimulus can be added (positive punishment) or removed (negative punishment). Broadly, there are three types of punishment: presentation of aversive stimuli (e.g., pain), response cost (removal of desirable stimuli such as monetary fines), and restriction of freedom (as in a 'time out'). Punishment in practice can often result in unwanted side effects, such as an increase in aggressive behaviors. Some other potential unwanted effects include resentment over being punished, attempts to escape the punishment, expression of pain and negative emotions associated with it, and recognition by the punished individual between the punishment and the person delivering it. Furthermore, because the termination of a problem behavior may serve as a negative reinforcement for the individual delivering punishment, careful monitoring must be implemented to ensure that over-punishment and behavioral drift are not occurring. Because of the risks and ethical considerations associated with punishment procedures, the Behavior Analysts Certification Board's code of ethics prohibits behavior analysts from utilizing punishment procedures unless less intrusive methods have been unsuccessful or "the risk of harm to the client outweighs the risk associated with the behavior-change intervention."

Extinction

Extinction is a procedure of withholding/discontinuing reinforcement for a previously reinforced behavior, resulting in the decrease of that behavior. The behavior is then set to be extinguished. Although extinction is less restrictive than punishment procedures, clients may exhibit extinction bursts when a previously reinforced behavior is no longer being reinforced. An extinction burst is the temporary increase in the frequency, intensity, and/or duration of the behavior targeted for extinction. Novel problem behaviors may also emerge during an extinction burst. The practicality of an extinction procedure must be carefully considered before being implemented as the inconsistent application of extinction may result in accidentally placing more severe forms of the behavior on a variable schedule of reinforcement, thus worsening the behavior and making it more resistant to intervention in the future.

Motivating operations

Motivating operations are variables that alter the effectiveness of a reinforcer. Variables that increase the effectiveness are establishing operations (EO), whereas variables that decrease the effectiveness of a reinforcer are abolishing operations (AO). Conditioned motivating operations (CMOs) are a type of motivating operation that is dependent on the individual's learning history and include transitive (CMO-T), surrogate (CMO-S), and reflexive (CMO-R) conditioned motivating operations.

=== Respondent (classical) conditioning ===
Respondent (classical) conditioning is based on involuntary reflexes. In respondent conditioning, an unconditioned response occurs in the presence of an unconditioned stimulus. When a neutral stimulus is repeatedly paired with an unconditioned stimulus, the response will begin occurring in the presence of the previously neutral stimulus; thus, the neutral stimulus and the unconditioned response become a conditioned stimulus and conditioned response, respectively. In his experiments with dogs, Ivan Pavlov presented dogs with food (unconditioned stimulus) and observed that the dogs began salivating (unconditioned response). Before running the experiment, the dogs did not salivate when Pavlov rang a bell (neutral stimulus). During the experiment, Pavlov rang a bell whenever he presented the dogs with food. After pairing the bell with the food, Pavlov stopped presenting the food with the bell, but the dogs continued to salivate when hearing the bell alone; thus, the bell became the conditioned stimulus, and salivating at the sound of the bell became a conditioned response. Unlike operant conditioning, the response does not produce a reinforcer or punisher (e.g., the dog does not get food because it salivates) in respondent conditioning.

== Measurement of behavior ==
In behavior analysis, behavior is defined as any movement of an organism that changes the environment; thus, behavior includes both voluntary (operant) and involuntary (respondent) behavior. Ogden Lindsley developed the Dead Man's Test to assist behaviorists in differentiating between behaviors and passive states of being. In it, the behaviorist must determine if the target is something a dead person could do; if it is, the target is not a behavior. According to Johnston and Pennypacker, behavior has three dimensions that can be measured: repeatability, temporal extent, and temporal locus.

=== Repeatability ===
Response classes occur repeatedly throughout time—i.e., how many times the behavior occurs.

- Frequency/Count is the number of occurrences in behavior.
- Rate is the number of instances of behavior per unit of time.
- Celeration is the measure of how the rate changes over time.

=== Temporal extent ===
The temporal extent refers to the duration of the response, which is the measure of time from the start to the end of the response. The duration of a response is either the duration of each response or the duration of all responses during a specific timeframe, which is then recorded as a percentage.

=== Temporal locus ===
Latency specifically measures the time that elapses between the event of a stimulus and the behavior that follows. This is important in behavioral research because it quantifies how quickly an individual may respond to external stimuli, providing insights into their perceptual and cognitive processing rates. There are two measurements that define temporal locus: response latency and interresponse time.

- Response latency measures the time between the presentation of a stimulus, such as an instruction, and the first response.
- Interresponse time refers to the interval between two instances of behavior, and it helps in understanding patterns and frequency of a behavior over time.

=== Derivative measures ===
Derivative measures are additional metrics derived from primary data, often by combining or transforming dimensional quantities to offer deeper insights into a phenomenon. Despite not being directly tied to specific dimensions, these measures provide valuable supplemental information. In applied behavior analysis (ABA), for example, percentage is a derivative measure that quantifies the ratio of specific responses to total responses, offering a nuanced understanding of behavior and assisting in evaluating progress and intervention effectiveness. Trials-to-criterion, another ABA derivative measure, tracks the number of response opportunities needed to achieve a set level of performance. This metric aids behavior analysts in assessing skill acquisition and mastery, influencing decisions on program adjustments and teaching methods. Applied behavior analysis relies on meticulous measurement and impartial evaluation of observable behavior as a foundational principle. Without accurate data collection and analysis, behavior analysts lack the essential information to assess intervention effectiveness and make informed decisions about program modifications. Therefore, precise measurement and assessment play a pivotal role in ABA practice, guiding practitioners to enhance behavioral outcomes and drive significant change.

== Methods developed through ABA research ==
=== Task analysis ===
Task analysis is the process of breaking down a multi-step instruction into its component parts. The student is then taught to complete a task analysis through chaining. For example, a task analysis of washing hands might include the following steps: Turn on the sink, put hands in the water, put soap on hands, scrub hands, rinse hands, turn off water. Task analysis has been used in organizational behavior management, a behavior analytic approach to changing the behaviors of members of an organization (e.g., factories, offices, or hospitals). Behavioral scripts often emerge from a task analysis. Bergan conducted a task analysis of the behavioral consultation relationship and Thomas Kratochwill developed a training program based on teaching Bergan's skills. A similar approach was used for the development of microskills training for counselors. Ivey would later call this "behaviorist" phase a very productive one and the skills-based approach came to dominate counselor training during 1970–90. Task analysis was also used in determining the skills needed to access a career. In education, Englemann (1968) used task analysis as part of the methods to design the direct instruction curriculum.

=== Chaining ===
Chaining is the process of teaching the steps of a task analysis. The two methods of chaining, forward chaining and backward chaining, differ based on what step a learner is taught to complete first. In forward chaining, the ABA practitioner teaches the learner to independently complete the first step and prompts the learner for all subsequent steps. In backward chaining, the practitioner prompts all steps except the last step. As the learner begins to respond independently, the practitioner systematically removes the prompts and teaches the next step in the task analysis. Total task presentation is a variation of forward chaining where the practitioner asks the learner to perform the entire task analysis and provides prompting only when the learner is unable to complete a step independently.

=== Prompting ===
A prompt is a cue that encourages a desired response from an individual. Prompts fall into one of two categories: stimulus prompts and response prompts. Stimulus prompts alter the environment in a way that makes the correct response more salient. Different types of stimulus prompts include positional, redundancy, and gestural prompts. Response prompts are cues directed toward the learner that include verbal, model, and physical prompts. Prompts are often categorized into a prompt hierarchy from most intrusive to least intrusive, although there is some controversy about what is considered most intrusive, those that are physically intrusive or those that are hardest prompt to fade (e.g., verbal). When using a most-to-least prompting strategy, the instructor begins prompting the learner using the most intrusive prompt in the hierarchy and systematically fading the prompts after multiple correct responses.

In contrast, when using a least-to-most prompting strategy, the instructor will first prompt the learner using the least intrusive prompt. If the learner does not respond correctly, the instructor will gradually increase the intrusiveness of the prompt until the learner emits a correct response. Other prompting strategies include no-no and errorless (or simultaneous) prompting. Errorless prompting involves providing a prompt that will result in a correct response immediately after presenting the instruction in order to minimize errors. Alternatively, when utilizing a no-no prompt, the learner is given an errorless prompt only after they have emitted two incorrect responses.

=== Fading ===
The overall goal is for an individual to eventually not need prompts. As an individual gains mastery of a skill at a particular prompt level, the prompt is faded to a less intrusive prompt. This ensures that the individual does not become overly dependent on a particular prompt when learning a new behavior or skill. An organized prompt fading procedure should be used. For example, when fading physical guidance, support might be gradually reduced from holding the learner's wrists, to lightly touching their hands, to touching the forearm or elbow, and finally to no physical contact. This ensures the learner does not become dependent on prompts while acquiring new skills.

=== Functional behavior assessment ===
According to behavior analysts, all behavior serves at least one of four primary functions: sensory (automatic), access to tangible items or activities, escape or avoidance, and attention. A functional behavior assessment (FBA) is the systematic process of identifying the environmental variables and reinforcement contingencies that maintain a target behavior. This process often includes data collection, direct observation, and analysis of contextual factors. FBAs that rely primarily on direct observation and measurement of behavior, rather than indirect methods such as interviews or rating scales, are also known as descriptive behavior assessments.

==== Functional analysis ====
Functional analysis is a process of experimentally controlling the environment in order to determine the function of a target behavior.

=== Thinning a reinforcement schedule ===
Thinning is often confused with fading. Fading refers to a prompt being removed, where thinning refers to an increase in the time or number of responses required between reinforcements. Periodic thinning that produces a 30% decrease in reinforcement has been suggested as an efficient way to thin. Schedule thinning is often an important and neglected issue in contingency management and token economy systems, especially when these are developed by unqualified practitioners (professional practice of behavior analysis).

=== Generalization ===
Generalization is the expansion of a student's performance ability beyond the initial conditions set for acquisition of a skill. Generalization can occur across people, places, and materials used for teaching. For example, once a skill is learned in one setting, with a particular instructor, and with specific materials, the skill is taught in more general settings with more variation from the initial acquisition phase. For example, if a student has successfully mastered learning colors at the table, the teacher may take the student around the house or school and generalize the skill in these more natural environments with other materials. Behavior analysts have spent a considerable amount of time studying factors that lead to generalization.

=== Shaping ===
Shaping involves modifying a single existing behavior into the target behavior by differentially reinforcing successive approximations of the target behavior. When the learner emits a response that is closer to the target behavior than previous responses, the new response is reinforced, and any instances of the old response are no longer reinforced. For example, if the target behavior were for the learner to say the word bubbles, a practitioner may initially blow bubbles in response to every vocal utterance made by the learner. Once the learner started emitting a bu- sound, the practitioner would only blow bubbles when the learner made this response. Eventually, the practitioner would only blow bubbles when the learner said bubbles.

=== Verbal behavior ===
B. F. Skinner's classification system of human language in behavior analysis has been applied to treatment of a host of communication disorders. Skinner's system includes:

- Tact – a verbal response evoked by a non-verbal antecedent and maintained by generalized conditioned reinforcement (e.g., identifying items, people, or nonhuman animals).
- Mand – behavior under control of motivating operations maintained by a characteristic reinforcer (e.g., direct reinforcement for a self-initiated request).
- Intraverbals – verbal behavior for which the relevant antecedent stimulus was other verbal behavior, but which does not share the response topography of that prior verbal stimulus (e.g., responding to another speaker's question).
- Echoic – vocal imitation under control of verbal stimuli (e.g., repeating what is said).
- Autoclitic – secondary verbal behavior which alters the effect of primary verbal behavior on the listener. Examples involve quantification, grammar, and qualifying statements (e.g., the differential effects of "I think..." vs. "I know...")

== Applications ==
=== Autism intervention ===
Although there are many applications of ABA outside of autism intervention, a large majority of ABA practitioners specialize in autism, and ABA itself is often mistakenly considered synonymous with therapy for autism. Practitioners often use ABA-based techniques to teach adaptive behaviors to, or diminish challenging behaviors presented by, autistic individuals. ABA methodologies such as differential reinforcement, extinction, and task analysis, are among the most well-researched evidence-based practices for autism intervention. In North America, ABA therapy is primarily provided by behavior technicians who deliver direct intervention under the supervision of Board Certified Behavior Analysts (BCBAs), who conduct assessments and write treatment plans for clients.

==== Discrete trial training ====
In 1965, early development of discrete trial training techniques, which was also known as the Lovaas method, involved the use of electric shocks, scolding, and the withholding of food. Ivar Lovaas published a series of articles that described a pioneering investigation of the antecedents and consequences that maintained a problem behavior, including aversives, such as slapping and electric shocks, to suppress stereotypic body movements and emotional outbursts. Lovaas described how to use social (secondary) reinforcers, teach children to imitate, and what interventions may be used to reduce aggression and life-threatening self-injury. He also relied on the methods of errorless learning, which was initially introduced by Charles Ferster to teach nonverbal children to speak.

In 1987, Lovaas published the study, "Behavioral treatment and normal educational and intellectual functioning in young autistic children". The experimental group in this study received an average of 40 hours per week in a 1:1 teaching setting at a table using errorless discrete trial training with a trained therapist. The treatment was implemented in the child's home. A heavy emphasis was placed on teaching eye contact, fine and gross motor imitation, academics, receptive and expressive language, and oral motor imitation. Each new skill is taught through prompting, modeling, and shaping. The outcome of this study indicated 47% of the experimental group (9/19) went on to lose their autism diagnosis and were described as indistinguishable from their typically developing adolescent peers. This included passing general education without assistance and forming and maintaining friendships. These gains were maintained as reported in the 1993 study, "Long-term outcome for children with autism who received early intensive behavioral treatment". Lovaas' work was recognized by the US Surgeon General and New York State Department of Health in 1999, and his research was replicated in university and private settings. The "Lovaas Method" went on to become known as early intensive behavioral intervention (EIBI).

In 2018, a Cochrane meta-analysis database concluded that preliminary research suggests that there are two different ABA teaching approaches to gaining spoken language: children with higher receptive language skills respond to 2.5 – 20 hours per week of the naturalistic approach, whereas children with lower receptive language skills acquire words from 25 hours per week of discrete trial training – the structured and intensive form of ABA. A 2023 multi-site randomized control trial study of 164 participants showed similar findings, with larger gains in the lower receptive language skilled group who obtained DTT.

==== Pivotal response treatment ====
Pivotal response treatment (PRT) is a naturalistic ABA-based intervention which targets skills that, when mastered, "can elicit more widespread positive clinical gains in the child's other domains of functioning." PRT's primary focus is increasing the learner's motivation by self-initiated requesting and to engage them socially through play within a behavioral framework. PRT recognizes that learners may be unmotivated to communicate due to natural causes, like genetic influences, and how learned helplessness from previously unsuccessful communication attempts can discourage future communication attempts.

=== Human applications outside of autism intervention ===
While ABA is often associated with autism intervention, it is also used in a variety of other fields, such as classroom instruction with typically developing students, pediatric feeding therapy, and substance use disorders. Other human applications of ABA include consumer behavior analysis, forensic behavior analysis, behavioral medicine, behavioral neuroscience, clinical behavior analysis, organizational behavior management, schoolwide positive behavior support, and contact desensitization for phobias. As of 2022, 350 domains of application of behavior analysis have been documented.

==== Acceptance and commitment therapy ====
Acceptance and commitment therapy (ACT) is a clinical approach which has its philosophical base in clinical behavior analysis and functional contextualism, and is guided by the theoretical framework of relational frame theory. The primary goal of ACT is to help the client acknowledge negative or unwanted private events, such as thoughts and feelings, and shift their self-identity from one based on psychological phenomenon to one based in self-as-context. Among the techniques the therapy uses include mindfulness and shaping.

==== Environmental conservation, sustainability, and climate change ====
Research and application in environmental conservation, sustainability, and climate change has spanned since the first environmental movement in the 1970s, influenced by early behavior analysts, such as E. Scott Geller. A review of peer-reviewed behavior-analytic journals showed the most common behavior-analytic interventions to promote proenvironmental behavior included incentives, feedback, punishment, prompting and education, response effort, stimulus control, self-monitoring, modeling, and commitment and goal-setting. A common critique of behavior analysis is that the research methods focus on single-subject research designs, which emphasizes internal validity before external validity, requiring scientific certainty that changes in the dependent variable (targeted behavior) is a result of the independent variable (intervention). This ensures that interventions are effective prior to applying to large populations. To address such concerns and tackle climate change as a wicked problem, the field has more recently expanded its emphasis on organizational environmental practices, climate change mitigation and adaption, and public policy implementation. Specific special interest groups (SIGs), Behavior Analysis for Sustainable Societies and Behaviorists for Social Responsibility, of the Association for Behavior Analysis International focus on this particular area.

=== Applied animal behavior and nonhuman animal welfare ===
ABA has been successfully applied to other species, such as in applied animal behavior. One example of a similar to ABA treatment was Pavlovs dog in which the stimulus (of a bell ringing) would cause a response (salivation), a comparison can be made to the stimulus causing a behavior which causes the consequence. While Board Certified Behavior Analysts work with humans, certified applied animal behaviorists are credentialed to deliver services to nonhuman animals in shelters and other community settings.

In 1992, Forthman and Ogden published an article describing ways that ABA could be used to promote the health and well-being of animals in zoos, such as compliance with veterinary care and encouraging species-specific behaviors. Pfaller-Sadovsky et al. (2019) conducted a functional analysis to determine the function of companion dogs jumping on their owners. The researchers successfully identified a function for the behavior for all five participants, and all five owners successfully reduced the frequency of the behavior by implementing a schedule of non-contingent reinforcement. The same year, Morris and Slocum successfully utilized functional analysis and non-contingent attention to reduce self-injurious feather-plucking in a black vulture.

== Criticisms ==
=== Neurodiversity movement ===
Some neurodiversity advocates, including autistic people who have experienced ABA interventions, criticize that ABA attempts to eliminate, suppress or reduce autistic behaviors and reinforces autistic people to mask their true characteristics, imitate non-autistic behaviors (e.g. eye contact, body language) and conform to an overly narrow conception of normal behavior. Masking is generally associated with suicidality and poor long-term mental health. Instead, these critics advocate for increased social acceptance of harmless and sometimes adaptive autistic traits and interventions focused on improving well-being and quality of life. The Autistic Self Advocacy Network (ASAN) campaigns against the use of ABA as an autism therapy. The European Council of Autistic People (EUCAP) published a 2024 position statement expressing deep concern about the harm caused by ABA. They emphasize that most surveyed autistic individuals view ABA as harmful, abusive, and counterproductive to their well-being. EUCAP advocates for a variety of support methods and the inclusion of autistic individuals in decision-making processes regarding their care.

A 2020 study examined perspectives of autistic adults that received ABA as children and found that the overwhelming majority reported that "behaviorist methods create painful lived experiences", that ABA led to the "erosion of the true actualizing self", and that they felt they had a "lack of self-agency within interpersonal experiences". Another study published in 2023 in Autism found similar results, with evidence of increased masking and causing mental health challenges for some autistic people. Quantitative evidence regarding likely widespread adverse effects of ABA interventions including mental health worsening, masking, and trauma, is also emerging, but currently limited with methodological limitations.

=== Research validity ===
Conflicts of interest, methodological concerns, and a high risk of bias pervade most ABA studies. A 2019 meta-analysis noted that "methodological rigor remains a pressing concern" in research into ABA's use as therapy for autism; while the authors found some evidence in favour of behavioral interventions, the effects disappeared when they limited the scope of their review to randomized controlled trial designs and outcomes for which there was no risk of detection bias.

==== Conflicts of interest in research ====
One study revealed extensive undisclosed conflicts of interest (COI) in published ABA studies. 84% of studies published in top behavioral journals over a period of one year had at least one author with a COI involving their employment, either as an ABA clinical provider or a training consultant to ABA clinical providers. However, only 2% of these studies disclosed the COI.

A five-year follow-up by the same research team, published in 2026, found that disclosure practices had worsened. The update reported that 93% of studies had at least one author with a clinical or consultancy COI, 78% of authors held such conflicts, only 8% of studies disclosed any conflicts, and 93% of statements claiming no conflicts of interest were false.

==== Quality of evidence ====
Low-quality evidence is likewise a concern in some research reporting on the potential harms of ABA on autistic children. Another concern is that ABA research only measures cognition or behavior as a means of success, which has led to a lack of qualitative research about autistic experiences of ABA, a lack of research examining the internal effects (e.g. mental health, well-being, emotions) of ABA and a lack of research for autistic children who are non-speaking or have co-occurring intellectual disabilities. Research is also lacking about whether ABA is effective long-term and very little longitudinal outcomes have been studied.

=== Ethical concerns ===
Opponents of ABA have denounced the ABA ethical code as too lenient, citing its failure to restrict or clarify the use of aversives, the absence of an autism or child development education requirement for ABA therapists, and its emphasis on parental consent rather than the consent of the person receiving services. Numerous researchers have argued that some forms of ABA interventions can be abusive and can increase symptoms of post-traumatic stress disorder (PTSD) in people undergoing the intervention. Some bioethicists argue that employing ABA violates the principles of justice and nonmaleficence and infringes on the autonomy of both autistic children and their parents.

=== Use of aversives ===
Lovaas incorporated aversives into some of the ABA practices he developed, including employing electric shocks, slapping, and shouting to modify undesirable behavior. Although the use of aversives in ABA became less common over time, and in 2012 their use was described as inconsistent with contemporary practice, aversives persisted in some ABA programs. In comments made in 2014 to the US Food and Drug Administration (FDA), a clinician previously employed by the JRC claimed that "all textbooks used for thorough training of applied behavior analysts include an overview of the principles of punishment, including the use of electrical stimulation."

=== Linguistic rigor ===
Skinner's verbal operants were critiqued by the linguist Noam Chomsky who argued that Skinner's view of language as behavior did not explain the complexity of human language.. Chomsky’s critiques of Skinner’s Verbal Behavior have been rebutted by subsequent scholars, who have argued for example that Chomsky was attributing assumptions to B.F. Skinner that he had not made. Further, Chomsky argued that "human language appears to be a unique phenomenon, without significant analogue in the animal world" this nativisitc view of language does not lend itself to an elegant interpretation of results in ABA, in which teaching non-verbal individuals to use language has been repeatedly demonstrated successfully.

=== Response to criticisms ===
Justin B. Leaf and others examined and responded to several of these criticisms of ABA in three papers published in 2018, 2019, and 2022, in which they questioned the evidence for such criticisms, concluding that the claim that all ABA is abusive has no basis in the published literature. Others have published similar responses. In addition, some forms of ABA interventions have been reforming to address these criticisms and mitigate the potential risks of harm, informed by neurodiversity approaches, related findings, and lived experiences of autistic people.

== See also ==
- Association for Behavior Analysis International
- Autism in psychoanalysis
- Behavior analysis of child development
- Behavior therapy
- Behavioral activation
- Educational psychology
- Parent management training
- Professional practice of behavior analysis
