= Ole Ivar Lovaas =

Norwegian-American psychologist (1927–2010)

O. Ivar Lovaas
- Born: Ole Ivar Løvaas; 8 May 1927; Lier, Norway
- Died: 2 August 2010 (aged 83); Lancaster, California, US
- Education: Luther College (BA); University of Washington (MS, PhD)
- Occupations: Clinical psychologist University professor
- Employer: University of California, Los Angeles
- Known for: Applied behavior analysis Discrete trial training Autism research Conversion therapy
- Spouse(s): Nina Watthen (m. 1986) Beryl Scoles (m. 1955; divorced)

Ole Ivar Lovaas (8 May 1927 – 2 August 2010) was a Norwegian-American clinical psychologist and professor at the University of California, Los Angeles. He was best known for his research on what is now called applied behavior analysis (ABA) to modify the behavior of autistic children through prompts, modeling, and positive reinforcement. Lovaas' methods included the use of aversives (punishment), such as electric shocks and slaps, to reduce undesired behavior.

His work influenced how autism is treated, and Lovaas received widespread acclaim and several awards during his lifetime, but also strong criticisms from many autistic activists and researchers aligned with the autistic rights and neurodiversity movements. Lovaas has also been criticized (including contemporaneously by other ABA researchers) for his participation in a study that tested the efficacy of conversion therapy on a four-year-old boy.

Although Lovaas claimed to have been a forced laborer during the German occupation of Norway (which began in 1940 and ended in 1945), historical records reflect uninterrupted school attendance, as well as his and his family's membership and participation in Nazi-aligned Norwegian organizations.

== Personal life ==
Lovaas was born in Lier, Norway, on 8 May 1927 to Hildur and Ernst Albert Løvaas, who was a watchmaker and journalist before taking leadership roles in the Nasjonal Samling party. He had two siblings: an older sister named Nora and a younger brother named Hans Erik. Lovaas attended Hegg Elementary School in Lier from 1934 to 1941. He attended junior high school at Drammen Realskole until 1944, and then moved on to Drammen Latin School for high school. Lovaas was enrolled in a program focusing on English as a second language and graduated in 1947. After high school, he served in the Norwegian Air Force for 18 months as a medic.

Lovaas claimed that he was a forced farm worker during the 1940s Nazi occupation of Norway, and often said that observing the Nazis had sparked his interest in human behavior and belief that behavior, both positive and negative, could be conditioned. However, Lovaas' claims about forced farm labor cannot be reconciled with school records that show he was continuously enrolled in classes during the occupation. The family were members of the fascist Nasjonal Samling (NS) Nazi collaborationist party: Lovaas' father was a high-ranking member who became one of Norway's "most important and influential Nazi propagandists", and Lovaas and his sister were active members; his mother and brother were also members, though not especially active. Lovaas himself was a member of the NS Youth League, patterned after the Hitler Youth and named after the Norwegian Hirden paramilitary organization. He stated he joined in 1941. The following year, Lovaas attended a six-week course at the league's prestigious fører ('führer') school in Jessheim and was subsequently made leader of a local chapter. Both he and his father are listed in Norway's "National Treason" files documenting Nazi collaboration. Scholar Åsmund Borgen Gjerde, who wrote on Lovaas' background and link to the NS, states, however, that it is hard to state what the significance of this time of Lovaas' life may have been.

Following World War II, Lovaas moved to the United States; at that time, he changed the spelling of his surname from Løvaas to Lovaas. There, Lovaas married Beryl Scoles in 1955, and they had four children together. Lovaas later divorced his wife and married Nina Watthen in 1986.

== Career ==
Lovaas began attending Luther College in Decorah, Iowa, in 1950, on a violin scholarship. He graduated after just one year with his B.A. in sociology. Lovaas received his Masters of Science in clinical psychology from the University of Washington in 1955, and his PhD in learning and clinical psychology from the same school three years later.

Early in his career, Lovaas worked at the Pinel foundation, which focused on Freudian psychoanalysis. After earning his PhD, he took a position at the University of Washington's Child Development Institute, where he first learned of behavior analysis. Lovaas began teaching at UCLA in 1961 in the Department of Psychology, where he performed research on autistic children at the school's Neuropsychiatric Institute. He started an early intervention clinic at UCLA called the UCLA Young Autism Project, which provided intensive intervention inside the children's homes. Lovaas was named professor emeritus in 1994. Lovaas also established the Lovaas Institute for Early Intervention (LIFE) that provides interventions based on his research.

Lovaas came to prominence for his work with autistic children in a 1965 feature in Life magazine. He taught prominent behaviorists, such as Robert Koegel, Laura Schreibman, Tristram Smith, Doreen Granpeesheh, John McEachin, Ron Leaf, and Jacquie Wynn, as well as thousands of UCLA students who took his "Behavior Modification" course during his 50 years of teaching. Lovaas also published hundreds of research articles and several books and received many accolades for his research. Due to this research, a number of school districts have adopted his programs. His work influenced how autism is treated.

Smith worked under Lovaas as a graduate student in the 1980s and described him as having a mercurial nature in a 2010 interview conducted after Lovaas' death. Smith stated the following:

I have to say, though, that I also had to develop a certain amount of equanimity. Lovaas could praise me extravagantly on some occasions yet give brusque criticism at other times; tell me to insert a passage into a manuscript that he would later reproach me for, excite his whole team about a new project or idea only to abandon it at the next meeting, set an agenda but then spend an entire meeting talking about something else altogether, and appear at meetings in a jovial mood or livid because of a mistake or oversight on my part. These ups and downs could be difficult, but I came to see them as a form of creative destruction that would ultimately lead to an original, important contribution.

== Research ==
=== Autism intervention ===
==== Early research ====
Lovaas prompting several young research subjects and using food as a reinforcer, ca. 1965

Lovaas established the Young Autism Project clinic at UCLA in 1962, where he began his research, authored training manuals, and recorded tapes of him and his graduate students implementing errorless learning—based on operant conditioning and what was then referred to as behavior modification—to instruct autistic children. Lovaas later coined the term "discrete trial training" to describe the procedure, which was used to teach listener responding, eye contact, fine and gross motor imitation, receptive and expressive language, academic, and a variety of other skills. In an errorless discrete trial, the child sits at a table across from the therapist who provides an instruction (i.e., "do this", "look at me", "point to", etc.), followed by a prompt, then the child's response, and a stimulus reinforcer. The prompts are later discontinued once the child demonstrates proficiency. During this time, Lovaas and colleagues also employed physical aversives (punishment), such as electric shocks and slaps, to decrease aggressive and self-injurious behavior, as well as verbal reprimands if the child answered incorrectly or engaged in self-stimulatory behavior.

==== 1987 study ====
In 1987, Lovaas published a study which demonstrated that, following 40 hours a week of treatment, nine of the 19 autistic children developed typical spoken language, increased IQs by 30 points on average, and were placed in regular classrooms. A 1993 follow-up study found that eight maintained their gains and were "indistinguishable from their typically developing peers", scoring in the normal range of social and emotional functioning. His studies were limited because Lovaas did not randomize the participants or treatment groups. This produced a quasi-experiment in which he was able to control the assignment of children to treatment groups. Lovaas' manipulation of the study in this way may have been responsible for the observed effects. The true efficacy of his method cannot be determined since his studies cannot be repeated for ethical reasons. A 1998 study subsequently recommended that EIBI programs be regarded with skepticism. In 1999, the United States Surgeon General's office wrote, "Thirty years of research has demonstrated the efficacy of applied behavioral methods in reducing inappropriate behavior and in increasing communication, learning, and appropriate social behavior", and he also endorsed the 1987 study.

==== Literature reviews ====
According to a 2007 review study in Pediatrics, "The effectiveness of [EIBI] in [autism spectrum disorder] has been well-documented through 5 decades of research by using single-subject methodology and in controlled studies... in university and community settings." It further stated, "Children who receive early intensive behavioral treatment have been shown to make substantial, sustained gains in IQ, language, academic performance, and adaptive behavior as well as some measures of social behavior, and their outcomes have been significantly better than those of children in control groups." However, the study also recommended to later generalize the child's skills with more naturalistic ABA-based procedures, such as incidental teaching and pivotal response treatment, so their progress is maintained.

Another review in 2008 described DTT as a "'well-established' psychosocial intervention for improving the intellectual performance of young children with autism spectrum disorders..." Three years later, it was found that the intervention is effective for some, but "the literature is limited by methodological concerns" due to there being small sample sizes and very few studies that used random assignment, and a 2018 Cochrane review subsequently indicated low-quality evidence to support this method. Nonetheless, a meta-analysis in the same journal database concludes how some recent research is beginning to suggest that because of the heterology of ASD, there are a wide range of different learning styles and that it is the children with lower receptive language skills who acquire spoken language from Lovaas' treatment. In 2023, a multi-site randomized control trial study of 164 participants indicated similar findings.

=== UCLA Feminine Boy Project ===
In 1974, Lovaas and George Rekers released the first in a series of papers associated with the Feminine Boy Project, a collective academic effort to formally develop conversion therapy (which consists of various discredited and abusive treatments intended to alter someone's sexual orientation, gender identity or gender expression to fit societal norms). The paper described the use of operant conditioning to force Kirk Murphy (then a four-year-old boy who was behaving in a traditionally feminine way) to behave in a gender-conforming manner. Lovaas and Rekers said in the paper that they hoped experimenting on Murphy would help them develop a method to prevent "adult transsexualism or similar adult sex-role deviation."

Murphy died by suicide in 2003; some members of his family attributed the suicide to the trauma that he endured during the study. Despite one of the subsequent papers (which Lovaas did not co-author) concluding that the conditioning Murphy was subjected to changed his sexual orientation from gay to heterosexual, his sister rejected that conclusion and claimed that Murphy "was conditioned to say that." After reviewing Murphy's journal entries, his sister described how he feared disclosing he was gay due to his father spanking him for playing with dolls and exhibiting other gender non-conforming behaviors. Murphy's brother stated, "I saw my brother's whole back side bruised so badly one time, my dad should have gone to jail for it."

In October 2020, the Journal of Applied Behavior Analysis (JABA) issued an expression of concern about the Rekers and Lovaas paper, which they had originally published. In the expression of concern, the journal editors acknowledged that the study would have violated ethical standards if conducted at the time of writing, but claimed they chose not to rescind the paper because they did not believe the study violated the ethical standards of its time. In a note accompanying the expression of concern, the journal's editors said that the study did psychological harm to Murphy and his family, but claimed that his suicide could not be causally linked to the study. The editors also said that the study did harm to the LGBTQ+ community by falsely validating the efficacy of conversion therapy, and stated that conversion therapy was not representative of the field of ABA as a whole.

JABA's justification for not retracting the paper was rejected by some members of academia, including Arthur Caplan, who founded the medical ethics division at the New York University Grossman School of Medicine, and Austin Johnson, the director of the school psychology program at the University of California, Riverside's Graduate School of Education. Caplan, who claimed he had "never seen such a 'historically oriented' disclosure," further stated, "I think many would have found punishing this behavior wrong by the standards of the day so I am not persuaded this note is accurate." Johnson stated, "Rekers and Lovaas abused Kirk Murphy, a cisgender gay man who ultimately committed suicide in 2003. The words used and actions described in Rekers and Lovaas are abusive and shameful. They did not have value in 1974. They do not have value now. To comply with editorial guidelines and basic human decency, JABA must retract this paper." Johnson also pointed out that the treatment of Murphy had been contemporaneously labeled unethical by some of Lovaas' peers, including ABA researcher Donald M. Baer, and that the American Psychiatric Association had already depathologized homosexuality at the time the paper was published.

Some members of the Autistic community, including some who have undergone ABA themselves, have labeled ABA "autistic conversion therapy" and directly compared it to conversion therapy targeting the queer community.

== Awards and accolades ==
Lovaas received praise from several organizations during his lifetime. In 2001, he was given the Society of Clinical Child and Adolescent Psychology Distinguished Career Award. Lovaas received the Edgar Doll Award from the 33rd Division of the American Psychological Association, the Lifetime Research Achievement Award from the 55th Division of the American Psychological Association, and the Award for Effective Presentation of Behavior Analysis in the Mass Media by the Association for Behavior Analysis International. Lovaas also earned a Guggenheim fellowship and the California Senate Award, which is an honorary doctorate. He was named a Fellow by Division 7 of the American Psychological Association and was given the Champion of Mental Health Award by Psychology Today.

== Criticism ==
The goal of making autistic people indistinguishable from their peers has attracted significant backlash from autistic activists and advocates. Julia Bascom of the Autistic Self Advocacy Network (ASAN) has said "ASAN's objection is fundamentally an ethical one. The stated end goal of ABA is an autistic child who is 'indistinguishable from their peers'—an autistic child who can pass as neurotypical. We don't think that's an acceptable goal. The end goal of all services, supports, interventions, and therapies an autistic child receives should be to support them in growing up into an autistic adult who is happy, healthy, and living a self-determined life." In his article on Lovaas' background, Gjerde states that Lovaas and other behavior analysts insisted on "normality and productivity" in autistic people, citing a 1981 quote from Lovaas: "No one has the right to be taken care of, no matter how retarded he is.… [Children] have no right to act bizarrely, many professional opinions notwithstanding. On the contrary, you have a right to expect decent behavior from your children".

Lovaas has also been criticized for his dehumanizing view of autistic people. During a 1974 interview with Psychology Today, Lovaas stated, "You start pretty much from scratch when you work with an autistic person. You have a person in the physical sense – they have hair, a nose, a mouth – but they are not people in the psychological sense."

=== Aversives ===
Lovaas is credited with popularizing the use of aversives in behavior modification, as shown in a Life magazine photo spread in 1965. He later admitted that they were only temporarily effective and punishments became less effective over time. Eventually, Lovaas abandoned these tactics, telling CBS in a 1994 interview, "These people are so used to pain that they can adapt to almost any kind of aversive you give them."

== See also ==
Human rights

- Autistic rights movement
- Neurotribes

Behaviorism

- George Rekers
- Conversion therapy
- Behaviorism
- B.F. Skinner

== Bibliography ==
- The Autistic Child: Language Development Through Behavior Modification, 1977
- Teaching Developmentally Disabled Children: The Me Book, 1981
- Teaching Individuals With Developmental Delays: Basic Intervention Techniques, 2003
