= Discrete trial training =

Applied behavior analysis teaching technique

Discrete trial training (DTT) is a technique used by practitioners of applied behavior analysis (ABA) that was developed by Ivar Lovaas at the University of California, Los Angeles (UCLA). DTT uses mass instruction and reinforcers that create clear contingencies to shape new skills. Often employed as an early intensive behavioral intervention (EIBI) for up to 25–40 hours per week for autistic children, the technique relies on the use of prompts, modeling, and positive reinforcement strategies to facilitate the child's learning. It previously used aversives to punish unwanted behaviors. DTT has also been referred to as the "Lovaas/UCLA model", "rapid motor imitation antecedent", "listener responding", "errorless learning", and "mass trials".

Many intensive behavioral interventions rely heavily on discrete trial teaching (DTT) methods, which use stimulus-response-reward techniques to teach foundational skills such as attention, compliance, and imitation. While DTT is effective for teaching foundational skills such as attention, compliance, and imitation, children may struggle to apply these skills to real-world settings. These students are also taught with naturalistic teaching procedures to help generalize these skills. In functional assessment, a common technique, a teacher formulates a clear description of a problem behavior, identifies antecedents, consequences, and other environmental factors that influence and maintain the behavior, develops hypotheses about what occasions and maintains the behavior, and collects observations to support the hypotheses. A few more-comprehensive ABA programs use multiple assessment and intervention methods individually and dynamically.

ABA-based techniques have demonstrated effectiveness in several controlled studies: children have been shown to make sustained gains in academic performance, adaptive behavior, and language, with outcomes significantly better than control groups. A 2009 review of educational interventions for children, whose mean age was six years or less at intake, found that the higher-quality studies all assessed ABA, that ABA is well-established and no other educational treatment is considered probably efficacious, and that intensive ABA treatment, carried out by trained therapists, is demonstrated effective in enhancing global functioning in preschool children. These gains may be complicated by initial IQ.

A 2008 evidence-based review of comprehensive treatment approaches found that ABA is well established for improving intellectual performance of young children with ASD. A 2009 comprehensive synthesis of early intensive behavioral intervention (EIBI), a form of ABA treatment, found that EIBI produces strong effects, suggesting that it can be effective for some children with autism; it also found that the large effects might be an artifact of comparison groups with treatments that have yet to be empirically validated, and that no comparisons between EIBI and other widely recognized treatment programs have been published.

A 2009 systematic review came to the same principal conclusion that EIBI is effective for some but not all children, with wide variability in response to treatment; it also suggested that any gains are likely to be greatest in the first year of intervention. A 2009 meta-analysis concluded that EIBI has a large effect on full-scale intelligence and a moderate effect on adaptive behavior. However, a 2009 systematic review and meta-analysis found that applied behavior intervention (ABI), another name for EIBI, did not significantly improve outcomes compared with standard care of preschool children with ASD in the areas of cognitive outcome, expressive language, receptive language, and adaptive behavior. ABA is cost effective for administrators.

A 2023 multisite randomized controlled trial compared 25 hours per week of discrete trial training (DTT) to 2.5 to 20 hours per week of JASPER therapy, a naturalistic developmental behavioral intervention. Progress was identified with both approaches: 45% of participants gained typical spoken language, and the children with lower receptive language skills who received DTT showed larger gains in the long-term.

.

== Technique ==
Discrete trial training (DTT) is a process whereby an activity is divided into smaller distinct sub-tasks and each of these is repeated continuously until a person is proficient. The trainer rewards successful completion and uses errorless correction procedures when the learner makes any error to condition them into mastering the process. Once proficiency is gained in each subtask, they are recombined into the complete activity: in this way proficiency at complex activities can be taught.

The intervention is often used in conjunction with the Picture Exchange Communication System (PECS) as it primes the child for an easy transition between treatment types. The PECS program serves as another common intervention technique used to support communications among autistic individuals. As many as 25% of autistic individuals have no functional speech. The program teaches spontaneous social communication through symbols or pictures by relying on ABA techniques. PECS operates on a similar premise to DTT in that it uses systematic chaining to teach the individual to pair the concept of expressive speech with an object. It is structured in a similar fashion to DTT, in that each session begins with a preferred reinforcer survey to ascertain what would most motivate the child and effectively facilitate learning.

== Effectiveness ==
Research shows limited likelihood that DTT is effective in enhancing spoken language, academic and adaptive skills, as many studies are of low quality, having small sample sizes and high risk of bias.

== Society and culture ==
=== In media ===
A 1965 article in Life magazine entitled Screams, Slaps and Love has had a lasting impact on public attitudes towards Lovaas's therapy. Giving little thought to how their work might be portrayed, Lovaas and parent advocate Bernie Rimland, M.D., were surprised when the magazine article appeared, since it focussed on text and selected images showing the use of aversives, including a close up of a child being slapped. Even after the use of aversives had been largely discontinued, the article continued to have an effect, galvanizing public concerns about behavior modification techniques.

=== United States cost ===
In April 2002 treatment cost in the U.S. was about US$4,200 per month ($50,000 annually) per child. The 20–40 hours per week intensity of the program, often conducted at home, may place additional stress on already challenged families.

== History ==
Discrete trial training is rooted in the hypothesis of Charles Ferster who theorized that autism was caused in part by a person's inability to react appropriately to "social reinforcers", such as praise or criticism. Lovaas's early work concentrated on showing that it was possible to strengthen autistic people's responses to these social reinforcers, but he found these improvements were not associated with any general improvement in overall behavior.

In a 1998 paper, psychologists Frank Gresham and Donald MacMillan described a number of weaknesses in Lovass's research and judged that it would be better to call the evidence for his interventions "promising" rather than "compelling".

Lovaas's original technique used aversives such as striking, shouting, and electrical shocks to punish undesired behaviors. By 1979, Lovaas had abandoned the use of aversives, and in 2012 the use of electric shocks was described as being inconsistent with contemporary practice.

== See also ==
- Professional practice of behavior analysis
