= Chrysalis School =

Former independent school for autistic children in Hertfordshire, England

The Chrysalis School was an independent school for autistic children in Hertfordshire, England. The school moved to Hitchin before closing in 2011. It used the model of applied behavior analysis (ABA) to facilitate teaching its pupils.

The school's aim was to start working with young children who had just been diagnosed as autistic, or those who had been following a home-based ABA programme. It was set up by two families who have autistic children.

With the backing of the Local Education Authority, plus fundraising and grants, the school provided places for children between five and sixteen years of age. The school was a registered charity.

== History ==
The Chrysalis School was founded by parents of children with autism who sought specialised educational provision that was not widely available in mainstream schools at the time.

The organisation behind the school, The Chrysalis School for Autism Ltd, was incorporated in November 2003 and registered as a charitable company in England and Wales. The charity's objectives included promoting and improving the education and wellbeing of children diagnosed with autism and related communication disorders.

The charity was officially registered on 8 January 2004 and later removed from the charity register in September 2012 after the organisation ceased operations. Company records indicate that the organisation later entered voluntary liquidation following the closure of the school.

== Fundraising events ==
The school regularly organised a variety of public events to raise funds. These included sports events; balls; musicals, such as a performance of the 'Twelfth Night' in 2008; and murder mystery nights.

== See also ==
- Applied behavior analysis
- Special education in the United Kingdom
