= Covert conditioning =

Approach to mental health treatment

Covert conditioning is an approach to mental health treatment that uses the principles of applied behavior analysis, or cognitive-behavior therapies (CBTs) to help individuals improve their behavior or inner experience. This method relies on the individual's ability to use imagery for purposes such as mental rehearsal. In some populations, it has been found that an imaginary reward can be as effective as a real one. The effectiveness of covert conditioning is believed to depend on the careful application of behavioral treatment principles, including a comprehensive behavioral analysis.

Some clinicians include the mind's ability to spontaneously generate imagery that can provide intuitive solutions or even reprocessing that improves people's typical reactions to situations or inner material. However, this goes beyond the behavioristic principles on which covert conditioning is based.

Therapies and self-help methods have aspects of covert conditioning. This can be seen in focusing, some neuro-linguistic programming methods such as future pacing, and various visualization or imaginal processes used in behavior therapies, such as CBTs or clinical behavior analysis.

== Therapeutic interventions ==
"Covert desensitization" associates an aversive stimulus with a behavior that the client wishes to reduce or eliminate. This is achieved by imagining the target behavior followed by imagining an aversive consequence. "Covert extinction" attempts to reduce a behavior by imagining the target behavior while imagining that the reinforcer does not occur. "Covert response cost" seeks to reduce a behavior by associating the loss of a reinforcer with the target behavior that is to be decreased.

"Contact desensitization" intends to increase a behavior by imagining a reinforcing experience in connection with modeling the correct behavior. "Covert negative reinforcement" attempts to increase a behavior by connecting the termination of an aversive stimulus with increased production of a target behavior.

"Dialectical behavior therapy" (DBT) and "Acceptance and commitment therapy" (ACT) uses positive reinforcement and covert conditioning through mindfulness.

== Effectiveness ==
Previous research in the early 1990s has shown covert conditioning to be effective with sex offenders as part of a behavior modification treatment package. Clinical studies continue to find it effective with some generalization from office to natural environment with this population.

== See also ==
- Covert hypnosis
