= E. Scott Geller =

American behavioral psychologist and academic

Prof. E. Scott Geller
- Born: February 7, 1942 (age 84)
- Occupations: Behavioral psychologist, author, academic
- Years active: 1969-present
- Title: Alumni Distinguished Professor

Academic background
- Education: BA in Pre-Medicine Studies, Ph.D. in Applied Psychology
- Alma mater: Southern Illinois University Carbondale
- Thesis: Dimensions of expectancy in a choice reaction time experiment (1969)
- Doctoral advisor: Gordon F. Pitz

Academic work
- Notable ideas: Actively Caring

E. Scott Geller (born February 7, 1942) is a behavioral psychologist, and currently an Alumni Distinguished Professor of Psychology at Virginia Tech and Director of the Center for Applied Behavior Systems. He is the founder of the idea of "Actively Caring". He is co-founder of GellerAC4P, a training/consulting firm dedicated to teaching and spreading the Actively Caring for People (AC4P) Movement worldwide. He is co-founder and Senior Partner of Safety Performance Solutions, Inc., a training and consulting organization specializing in behavior-based safety since 1995.

== Education ==
Scott Geller graduated from The College of Wooster in 1964 with Bachelors of Arts in Pre-Medicine Studies. Geller graduated from Southern Illinois University Carbondale in 1969 with a PhD in Applied Psychology.

== Ted Talk ==
On December 5, 2013, Tedx Talks upload a Scott Geller's Ted Talk from TedxVirginiaTech to YouTube. The clip has generated more than 12 million views and 175,000 likes.

== Bibliography ==
=== Books ===
- Working Safe: How to Help People Actively Care for Health and Safety (1996)
- The Participation Factor: How to Increase Involvement in Occupational Safety (2008)
- Actively Caring for People: Cultivating a Culture of Compassion (2012)
- Applied Psychology: Actively Caring for People (2016)
- Actively Caring for People's Safety: How to Cultivate a Brother's/Sister's Keeper Work Culture (2017)

=== Book chapters ===
- Geller, E. Scott. "The challenge of increasing proenvironment behavior." Handbook of environmental psychology 2, no. 396 (2002): 525–540.

=== Journal articles ===
- Geller, E. Scott. "Evaluating energy conservation programs: Is verbal report enough?." Journal of Consumer research 8, no. 3 (1981): 331–335. doi:10.1086/208872
- Geller, E. Scott. "Applied behavior analysis and social marketing: An integration for environmental preservation." Journal of social issues 45, no. 1 (1989): 17–36. doi:10.1111/j.1540-4560.1989.tb01531.x
- Geller, E. Scott. "Ten principles for achieving a total safety culture." Professional Safety 39, no. 9 (1994): 18.
- Dula, Chris S., and E. Scott Geller. "Risky, aggressive, or emotional driving: Addressing the need for consistent communication in research." Journal of safety research 34, no. 5 (2003): 559–566. doi:10.1016/j.jsr.2003.03.004
- Lehman, Philip K., and E. Scott Geller. "Behavior analysis and environmental protection: Accomplishments and potential for more." Behavior and social issues 13 (2004): 13–33. doi:10.5210/bsi.v13i1.33
- Geller, E. Scott. "Behavior-based safety and occupational risk management." Behavior modification 29, no. 3 (2005): 539–561.
- Bolderdijk, Jan Willem, Linda Steg, E. Scott Geller, Philip K. Lehman, and Tom Postmes. "Comparing the effectiveness of monetary versus moral motives in environmental campaigning." Nature climate change 3, no. 4 (2013): 413–416. doi:10.1038/nclimate1767
