= Allen Neuringer =

American psychologist

Allen Neuringer is an American psychologist. He is a highly published and well regarded scientist in the field of the experimental analysis of behavior, as pioneered by B.F. Skinner. His areas of research include human volition studies, the generation of randomness in organisms, self-experimentation, and many other areas. He received his B.A. at Columbia College in 1962, and his PhD from Harvard University in 1967. He served on National Institute of Health (NIH) and National Science Foundation (NSF) committees, received numerous awards and grants for his research, and has published widely. As of June 2008, Neuringer retired as a professor of psychology at Reed College.

== Early life and education ==
Neuringer was born ca. 1940. He received his B.A. at Columbia College. He did his PhD at Harvard University.

== Career ==
As of June 2008, Neuringer retired as a professor of psychology at Reed College.

He has also been an editor or assistant editor on four journals, and currently is an editor for the Journal of the Experimental Analysis of Behavior (JEAB). He has been a reviewer on 23 journals, including Science and the Journal of Applied Behavior Analysis.

He served on National Institute of Health (NIH) and National Science Foundation (NSF) committees.

== Research interests ==
Neuringer is a social scientist in the field of the experimental analysis of behavior, as pioneered by B.F. Skinner. His areas of research include human volition studies, the generation of randomness in organisms, self-experimentation, and many other areas.

=== Randomness and behavior ===
Neuringer's work focused on the production of "pure randomness" in human and other organismic behavior, something that was widely considered impossible. Matching and reinforcing human and animal responses to a random number generator he was able to have humans and other organisms behave "randomly".

=== Melioration and self-experimentation ===
Neuringer has suggested that behavior analysis as a field might benefit from using experimental designs that explicitly and directly attempted to meliorate the condition of an experimental subject. He envisaged placing practical everyday goals as the objective of experiments and, especially, self-experiments.

== Awards and recognition ==
Neuringer's work has received numerous NSF/NIMH grants.

== Personal life ==
Neuringer, with his wife, live in a house they built in a forested area in the State of Oregon.

== Representative publications ==
- Neuringer A (December 2004). "Reinforced variability in animals and people: implications for adaptive action". Am Psychol. 59 (9): 891–906. CiteSeerX 10.1.1.334.1772. doi:10.1037/0003-066X.59.9.891. PMID 15584823.
- Neuringer A (December 2002). "Operant variability: evidence, functions, and theory". Psychon Bull Rev. 9 (4): 672–705. doi:10.3758/bf03196324. PMID 12613672.
- Grunow A, Neuringer A (June 2002). "Learning to vary and varying to learn". Psychon Bull Rev. 9 (2): 250–8. doi:10.3758/bf03196279. PMID 12120786.
- Vickrey C, Neuringer A (June 2000). "Pigeon reaction time, Hick's law, and intelligence". Psychon Bull Rev. 7 (2): 284–91. doi:10.3758/bf03212983. PMID 10909135.
- Neuringer A (November 1984). "Melioration and self-experimentation". J Exp Anal Behav. 42 (3): 397–406. doi:10.1901/jeab.1984.42-397. PMC 1348111. PMID 16812398.
