= Response-prompting procedures =

Response-prompting procedures are systematic strategies used to increase the probability of correct responding and opportunities for positive reinforcement for learners by providing and then systematically removing prompts. Response prompting is sometimes called errorless learning because teaching using these procedures usually results in few errors by the learner. The goal of response prompting is to transfer stimulus control from the prompt to the desired discriminative stimulus. Several response prompting procedures are commonly used in special education research: (a) system of least prompts, (b) most to least prompting, (c) progressive and constant time delay, and (d) simultaneous prompting.

== System of least prompts ==
The SLP prompting procedure uses and removes prompts by moving through a hierarchy from less to more restrictive prompts. If the student emits the correct behavior at any point during this instructional trial (with or without prompts), reinforcement is provided. The system of least prompts gives the learner the opportunity to exhibit the correct response with the least restrictive level of prompting needed. Because teachers are required to use multiple types of prompts (e.g., verbal and physical prompts), the SLP prompting procedure may be complicated for use in typical settings, but may be similar to non-systematic teaching procedures typically used by teachers that involve giving learners an opportunity to exhibit a behavior independently before providing a prompt.

=== Example: SLP trial for teaching sitting behavior ===
Prompt Level	Teacher Behavior	Learner Behavior and Consequence	Learner Behavior and Consequence	Learner Behavior and Consequence
Independent	Gives direction:"Everyone sit in their desk"	Unprompted Correct: Sits (provide reinforcer)	No response (provide prompt 1)	Unprompted Incorrect (provide prompt 1)
Verbal Prompt	Gives Prompt 1: "Matt, please sit in your desk"	Prompted Correct: Sits (provide reinforcer)	No response (provide prompt 2)	Prompted Incorrect (provide prompt 2)
Gesture Prompt	Gives Prompt 2: "Everyone sit in their desk." Moves towards and points to desk	Prompted Correct: Sits (provide reinforcer)	No response (provide prompt 3)	Prompted Incorrect (provide prompt 3)
Physical Prompt	Gives Prompt 3: Puts hands on learner's shoulders and physically guides him to sit	Prompted Correct: Sits (provide reinforcer)	No response (ignore). This response is unlikely: re-evaluate prompt and/or value of reinforcer	No response (ignore). This response is unlikely: re-evaluate prompt and/or value of reinforcer

SLP has been widely used for a variety of learners and skills. It has been most widely used in a 1:1 format (individual instruction) for chained skills. It has recently been used in conjunction with new technology, like portable DVD players and video iPods, to each self-help skills to young adults with intellectual disabilities and to improve transition skills for elementary school students with autism spectrum disorders.

== Most to least prompting ==
The MTL prompting procedure (Cuvo, Leaf, & Borakove, 1978) removes prompts by moving through a hierarchy from most restrictive to less restrictive. The MTL prompting procedure begins with the most restrictive prompt, usually a physical prompt. After the learner has received reinforcement for completing the task with physical prompts, a less restrictive prompt is given (e.g., a partial physical prompt), and then an even less restrictive prompt (e.g., verbal prompt). Usually, a specific criterion is set for each prompt change (e.g., after three days of correct performance of the behavior with the use of a partial physical prompt, a verbal prompt will be used). If the individual fails to perform the behavior correctly with the less intrusive prompt, the instructor would return to a more intrusive prompt for a specified number of trials. Eventually, the discriminative stimulus for the behavior is the typically occurring stimulus (e.g., when lunch is finished, student independently goes to the sink to wash hands) or the direction (e.g., when teacher says "Class, it is time to sit in your desks", the student sits in his desk).

=== Example: MTL prompting procedure for opening lunchbox ===
Order of Prompts	Prompting Level	Teacher Behavior	Criterion for Moving to Less Intrusive Prompt
1	Physical	Places hands over learner's hands and physically guides learner to open lunchbox	3 days at 100% correct responding with physical prompts
2	Verbal	Says "Matt, open your lunchbox."	3 days at 100% correct responding with verbal prompts
3	Independent	Gives learner his lunchbox	N/A

MTL prompting procedures have been most often used to teach chained tasks (e.g., hand washing) to learners with intellectual disabilities, but has been used to teach learners with mild to profound disabilities from infants to adults. Wolery and Gast suggest that MTL prompting procedures should be used with non-imitative learners who may not initially respond to less-restrictive prompts like models and may not be as efficient for imitative learners with mild or no disabilities.

== Constant and progressive time delay ==
With CTD and PTD procedures, the same prompt is used throughout, and this prompt should ensure that the learner can give the correct response: It is a "controlling" prompt. The time delay prompt procedures are different from SLP and MTL procedures because instead of removing prompts by progressing through a hierarchy, prompts are removed by delaying them in time. The progressive time delay procedure was developed first, and the constant time delay procedure was developed as a more parsimonious procedure for teaching students with disabilities. CTD and PTD are systematic procedures that use the teaching strategy of waiting on a learner's response that has likely been used haphazardly for years.

When using time delay procedures, a prompt is initially given immediately after the desired discriminative stimulus. For example, immediately after the teacher says "What is this?" while showing a picture of a dog, she gives the student the correct answer "dog". After a pre-specified number of trials (when teaching discrete tasks, usually this is a "session" comprising at least 10 trials), the prompt is delayed. In the previous example, the teacher would ask the question "What is this?" and would then wait a few seconds before giving the controlling prompt "dog". PTD delays the prompt in time gradually, so the teacher would first wait 1 second, then 2 seconds, etc. CTD delays the prompt in time only once, usually by 3–5 seconds.

=== Example: Trial during an initial session of PTD or CTD to teach naming ===
Prompt Level	Teacher Behavior	Learner Behavior and Consequence	Learner Behavior and Consequence	Learner Behavior and Consequence
Prompted	"What is this? Dog." While showing a picture of a dog. (Waits specified time; e.g., 3 seconds)	Prompted Correct: "Dog" (provide reinforcer)	Prompted Incorrect: "Cat" (ignore)	No Response (ignore)

During initial sessions, the learner is not given the opportunity to respond independently because the prompt is given immediately (0-second delay). However, in subsequent sessions, a learner is given an opportunity to respond independently because the prompt is delayed in time. The learner accesses reinforcement more quickly if s/he answers independently, but s/he is still reinforced for prompted responses.

=== Example: Trial during a subsequent session of PTD or CTD to teach naming ===
Prompt Level	Teacher Behavior	Learner Behavior and Consequence	Learner Behavior and Consequence	Learner Behavior and Consequence
Independent	"What is this?" while showing a picture of a dog. (Waits specified time; e.g., 3 seconds)	Unprompted Correct: "Dog" (provide reinforcer)	Unprompted Incorrect: "Cat" (remind to wait for a prompt if s/he doesn't know the answer)	No Response (provide prompt)
Prompted	"What is this? Dog." While showing a picture of a dog. (Waits specified time; e.g., 3 seconds)	Prompted Correct: "Dog" (provide reinforcer)	Prompted Incorrect: "Cat" (ignore)	No Response (ignore)

PTD and CTD are similar except that the delay is gradual for PTD and immediate for CTD. For students who are not able to wait for a prompt when they are unable to independently perform a skill, PTD may be a better choice as a prompting strategy because it will decrease errors.

Example: Delay by session for PTD and CTD

Session	PTD Delay	CTD Delay
1	0 sec	0 sec
2	1 sec	3 sec
3	2 sec	3 sec
4	3 sec	3 sec
5 and remaining sessions	3 sec	3 sec

CTD and PTD have been extensively used and found to be effective with a variety of students with and without disabilities, across both discrete and chained skills, in both individual and small group settings, for learners from toddlers to adults. Like SLP, CTD has been used in conjunction with new technologies like SMART boards to teach children with disabilities.

== Simultaneous prompting ==
A modification of the time delay procedures was presented by Schuster and colleagues in 1992. For this procedure, the same prompt is given during every session (a controlling prompt; similar to CTD and PTD). However, the prompt is not delayed in time. During every instructional session, the prompt is immediately given to the student after the stimulus is presented (see 0 second delay sessions, above). The learner does not have a chance to emit an unprompted response during these sessions. However, immediately before each session, a probe session is conducted to test whether the child can emit an unprompted correct response. So, using an example similar to the one above, a teacher might present a picture and ask "What is this?" and then immediately give a prompt ("dog") during instructional sessions. Each day prior to instructional sessions, the teacher would ask "What is this?" but provide no prompts. This probe session is done to test whether the student has acquired the material. Instruction ends when the learner reaches a criterion level (e.g., 100% correct for 3 consecutive days) during probe sessions.

The primary advantage of simultaneous prompting, when compared with time delay procedures, is that a learner does not need to have the prerequisite skill of waiting for a prompt if he or she cannot independently emit the behavior. It is also a less complicated procedure for teachers to use because there are fewer response variations (e.g., unprompted corrects and unprompted incorrects are not possible) and fewer prompt variations (e.g., no need to vary prompt intrusiveness or delay).

Simultaneous prompting has been used with learners from three years of age through adulthood, and with learners with learning disabilities, intellectual disabilities, developmental delays, and learners without disabilities. A recent study suggests that it may not be necessary to conduct probes every day, but further research is needed to determine how frequency of probe sessions affects efficiency of the procedure.

== Summary and limitations ==
All of the discussed response prompting procedures can be considered evidence based practices using the criteria suggested by Horner and colleagues in 2005. Studies have shown that response prompting is effective for learners from preschool through adulthood, in a variety of instructional contexts (e.g., embedded into large group activities, during small group direct instruction). In addition, studies have shown that a variety of instructional agents, including teachers, assistants, and peers with and without disabilities, can accurately use prompting procedures.

Little is known about the use of prompting procedures when procedural fidelity is low, as it may be in typical instructional contexts, though errors in some steps of the procedure may not impede learning. Additional studies regarding typical errors made by instructors and the effects of the errors on acquisition of skills by learners are needed. In addition, prompting procedures have been primarily used to teach specific responses rather than response classes (e.g., conversational skills, social play skills). The relative effectiveness of response prompting procedures to teach response classes needs to be studied.
