= Pain model of behaviour management =

Classroom behaviour management model

The pain model of behaviour management, which acknowledges that physical pain and psychological pain may inhibit learning, is a model developed for teachers who work with students who have extremely challenging behaviours, social problems and a lack of social skills. The model's strategies may also be used by teachers to prevent the development of challenging behaviours in the classroom.

The model was developed in Queensland, Australia early this decade by a team of behaviour support teachers led by Patrick Connor, an applied psychologist working as a guidance officer within this team. The teachers, who work within a Behaviour Management Unit work with children who can no longer attend school due to exclusions or suspension from school. The pain model is grounded in the work they have done with these students identified as high-risk; students whose behaviour has resulted in a referral to the Behaviour Management Unit – a service supplied to schools by some states in Australia.

== Basis ==
Connor drew on the work of Eric Berne and Harris who researched the influences of past experiences on later behaviour, and O’Reilly (1994) and accepted the proposition of the neuro-physiological link between the brain and behaviour. Connor recognised, as far as learning was concerned, that there was little difference between the effect of physical pain and psychological pain. Both types of pain were debilitating and inhibited learning.

The pain model recognises that social problems such as homelessness, skill-lessness, meaninglessness, domestic violence, abuse, addiction or chemical or organic problems such as autism spectrum disorder (ASD) or attention deficit hyperactivity disorder (ADHD) cause psychological pain. When high-risk students (students that are experiencing one or more of these problems) are fearful, stressed and experiencing psychological pain teachers need to calm the student and relieve the pain before participation within the school environment can begin.

The model also allows the teacher to understand that the student’s behaviour is due to the pain they are experiencing making a less stressful classroom environment and allowing teachers to be more patient with students.

== Assumptions ==
1. If students ‘feel good’ they will ‘act good’; if students ‘feel bad’ they will ‘act bad’.
2. Behaviour is a type of communication and, because it is a type of communication schools may misinterpret the intended meaning of the message the student is sending through ‘bad’ behaviour.
3. Students who act ‘bad’ may be unhappy and experiencing pain; inflicting punishment will only make this worse. Listening to students is more appropriate than punishing them.
4. When young people are abused they cannot build primary relationships and often do not have the skills to participate in the class environment. They need to be taught these skills prior to gradual reintegration to the school.
5. Traditional models of discipline are not effective with high-risk students.
6. Some students ‘act bad’ in order to be punished and noticed. As a result, they are noticed for their behaviour not for who they are.

== Principles ==
- Acknowledge the pain
- Value the person

== Preventative strategies ==
- Develop relationships
- Give clear instructions
- Care for teachers – support provided to teachers with ‘high-risk’ students.

== Corrective strategies ==
- Relieve the pain and calm the student – teach relaxation techniques, assess and address physical needs
- Re-skill the student – teach personal skills, interpersonal skills, academic skills and problem solving skills
- Reconstruct self-esteem – use slogans; set up for success; encourage
- Use related strategies - agreements; self-managing log; adjunctive therapies; collaboration with parents
- Refer on - deeper therapy.

== School-wide strategies ==
- Make school a welcoming place
- Create a welfare centre

== Advantages ==
- Less stress for teachers
- Better outcomes for high-risk students
- Long-term advantages for teachers and society
- Actively involves parents in process

== Disadvantages ==
- Resource intensive
- Change to whole school culture needed
- It is difficult for some teachers to relinquish power
- Some teachers expect naughty students to be punished
- Some aspects of the model are not suitable for use as general behaviour management for the majority of classes
- Relies upon all aspects of the child’s life supporting the basis of this model in order for it to be successful
