= Aversives =

Unpleasant stimulus that induces changes in behavior through punishment

Denatonium, a very bitter chemical, is sometimes employed as an aversive substance in special nail polishes intended to reduce or discourage nail biting.

In psychology, aversives are unpleasant stimuli that induce changes in behavior via negative reinforcement or positive punishment. By applying an aversive immediately before or after a behavior, the likelihood of the target behavior occurring in the future may be reduced. Aversives can vary from being slightly unpleasant or irritating to physically, psychologically and/or emotionally damaging.

== Types of stimuli ==
There are two types of aversive stimuli:

=== Unconditioned ===
Unconditioned aversive stimuli naturally result in pain or discomfort and are often associated with biologically harmful or damaging substances or events. Examples include extreme heat or cold, bitter flavors, electric shocks, loud noises and pain. Aversives can be applied naturally (such as touching a hot stove) or in a contrived manner (such as during torture or behavior modification).

=== Conditioned ===
A conditioned aversive stimulus is an initially neutral stimulus that becomes aversive after repeated pairing with an unconditioned aversive stimulus. This type of stimulus would include consequences such as verbal warnings, gestures or even the sight of an individual who is disliked.

== Use in applied behavior analysis (ABA) ==
A patent drawing of the GED, an aversive conditioning device

Aversives may be used as punishment or negative reinforcement during applied behavior analysis. In early years, the use of aversives was represented as a less restrictive alternative to the methods used in mental institutions such as shock treatment, hydrotherapy, straitjacketing and frontal lobotomies. Early iterations of the Lovaas technique incorporated aversives, though Lovaas later abandoned their use. Over time the use of aversives has become less common, though they are still in use as of 2021.

Several national and international disability rights groups have spoken against the use of aversive therapies, including TASH and the Autism National Committee (known as AUTCOM). Although it has generally fallen out of favor, at least one institution continues to use electric shocks on the skin as an aversive. A ruling in 2018 supported its continued use. The FDA has made a commitment to ban its use, but as of January 2019 has not yet done so.

A report from the Food and Drug Administration found that "the literature contains reports that when health care providers have resorted to punishers... the addition of punishers proved no more successful than [Positive behavioral support]-only techniques... Reflecting this trend, a 2008 survey of members of the Association for Behavior Analysis found that providers generally view punishment procedures as having more negative side effects and being less successful than reinforcement procedures." The Behavior Analyst Certification Board has stated their support the use of aversives on children with consent by a parent or guardian.

=== Opposition ===
The use of aversives in applied behavior analysis is opposed by many advocacy groups for people with disabilities. These include:

- Autistic Self Advocacy Network
- Arc of the United States
- Aspies For Freedom
- Autism Network International

== See also ==
- Carrot and stick
- Extinction (psychology)
- Pavlovian-instrumental transfer
