= Behavior-based safety =

System used in industry to reduce exposure to hazards

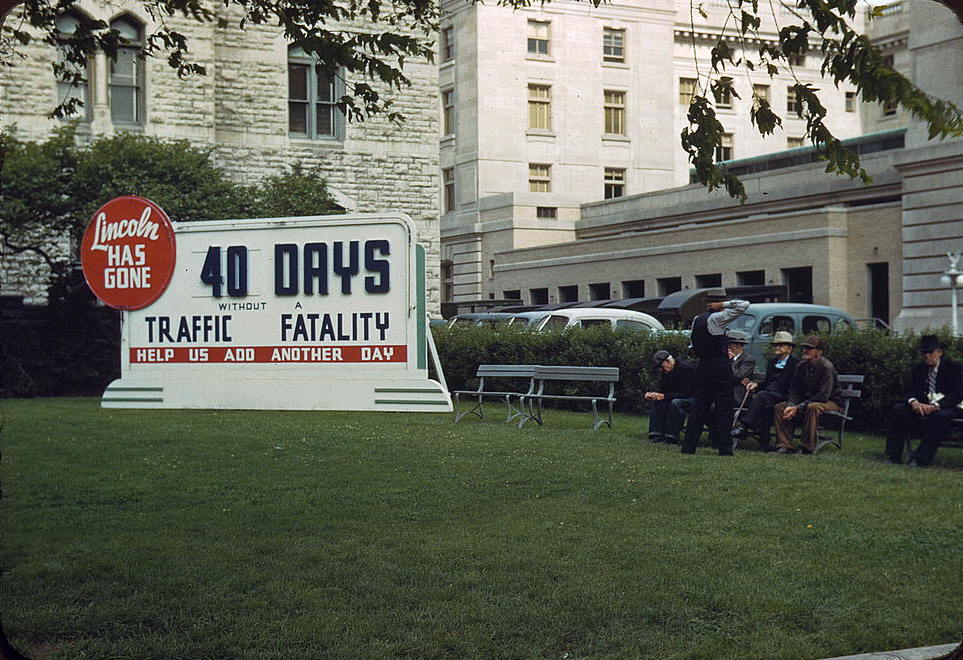

Behavior-based safety (BBS) is the "application of science of behavior change to real world safety problems". or "A process that creates a safety partnership between management and employees that continually focuses people's attentions and actions on theirs, and others, daily safety behavior." BBS "focuses on what people do, analyzes why they do it, and then applies a research-supported intervention strategy to improve what people do". At its very core BBS is based on a larger scientific field called organizational behavior management.

== History ==
BBS is considered to have emerged in the U.S. in the 1970s. The psychological roots of these concepts stem from the work of B.F. Skinner and the ideas of behaviorism. Behaviorism involves the understanding that human behavior is learned through reinforcement, punishment, or other consequences in the environment. As behaviorism evolved in the field of psychology, experimental behavior analysis and applied behavior analysis emerged as therapeutic techniques and intervention strategies. This connects to how BBS is an approach that focuses on what an individual is doing, analyzes reasoning behind a current action, and then prescribes an intervention to change behavioral outcomes in the workplace.

== Application ==

In a safety management system based upon the hierarchy of hazard control, BBS may be applied to internalize hazard avoidance strategies or administrative controls (including use of personal protective equipment), but should not be used in preference to the implementation of reasonably practicable safety measures further up the hierarchy.

Behavior-based safety systems may vary across workplaces, but there are five common elements that they will share:

- Identifying behaviors that impact safety
- Defining the behaviors so they can be measured
- Developing and implementing ways to measure progress towards safety goals
- Providing feedback
- Reinforcing progress

An acronym commonly used for the implementation of behavior-based safety is DO IT. This stands for define, observe, intervene, test. You begin by identifying the target behaviors that need to be changed in the workplace for increased safety. From there, you would observe the baseline behaviors, implement interventions, and test the impact of these interventions.

The BBS implementation process is done by observing the work in its natural setting, measuring the frequency and rate of behaviors, and providing feedback. The antecedents and consequences of target behaviors for effective intervention. When interventions are implemented, it is important to continue to take observations and collect data to compare to the baseline behavior measurements. Both individual and group performance may be considered for BBS, and feedback should reflect this. The goal of BBS is to promote values of positive workplace safety culture, and this begins with the communication to the employee from the employers.

Additionally, in order to be successful a BBS program must include all employees, from the CEO to the front line workers including hourly, salary, union employees, contractors and sub-contractors. To achieve changes in behavior, a change in policy, procedures and/or systems most assuredly will also need some change. Those changes cannot be done without buy-in and support from all involved in making those decisions.

BBS is not based on assumptions, personal feeling, and/or common knowledge. To be successful, the BBS program used must be based on scientific knowledge.
