= Punishment (psychology) =

Stimulus that reinforces the cessation of a behavior

Operant conditioning	Extinction
Reinforcement; Increase behavior	Punishment; Decrease behavior
Positive reinforcement Add appetitive stimulus following correct behavior	Negative reinforcement	Positive punishment Add noxious stimulus following behavior	Negative punishment Remove appetitive stimulus following behavior
Escape; Remove noxious stimulus following correct behavior	Active avoidance Behavior avoids noxious stimulus

Punishment is any change in a human or animal's surroundings which, occurring after a given behavior or response, reduces the likelihood of that behavior occurring again in the future. Reinforcement, referring to any behavior that increases the likelihood that a response will occurs, plays a large role in punishment. Motivating operations (MO) can be categorized in abolishing operations, decrease the effectiveness of the stimuli and establishing, increase the effectiveness of the stimuli. For example, a painful stimulus which would act as a punisher for most people may actually reinforce some behaviors of masochistic individuals.

There are two types of punishment: positive and negative. Positive punishment involves the introduction of a stimulus to decrease behavior while negative punishment involves the removal of a stimulus to decrease behavior. While similar to reinforcement, punishment's goal is to decrease behaviors while reinforcement's goal is to increase behaviors. Different kinds of stimuli exist as well. Rewarding stimuli are considered pleasant; however, aversive stimuli are considered unpleasant. There are also two types of punishers: Primary and secondary punishers. Primary punishers directly affect the individual such as pain and are a natural response. Secondary punishers are things that are learned to be negative like a buzzing sound when getting an answer wrong on a game show.

Conflicting findings have been found on the effectiveness of the use of punishment. Some have found that punishment can be a useful tool in suppressing behavior while some have found it to have a weak effect on suppressing behavior. Punishment can also lead to lasting negative unintended side effects as well. In countries that are wealthy, high in trust, cooperation, and democracy, punishment has been found to be effective.

Punishment has been used in a lot of different applications. It has been used in applied behavioral analysis, specifically in situations to try to punish dangerous behaviors like head banging.

In some situations, punishment techniques have been seen as effective. Children with intellectual disabilities, autism and those who participate in stuttering therapy have had a positive outcome using punishment as a means to learn. Stuttering therapy can help a child improve their speech fluency, develop communication effectively, and be able to participate in all class activities.

== Types ==
There are two basic types of punishment in operant conditioning:

- positive punishment, punishment by application, or type I punishment, an experimenter punishes a response by presenting an aversive stimulus into the animal's surroundings (a brief electric shock, for example).
- negative punishment, punishment by removal, or type II punishment, a valued, appetitive stimulus is removed (as in the removal of a feeding dish). As with reinforcement, it is not usually necessary to speak of positive and negative in regard to punishment.

Punishment is not a mirror effect of reinforcement. In experiments with laboratory animals and studies with children, punishment decreases the likelihood of a previously reinforced response only temporarily, and it can produce other "emotional" behavior (wing-flapping in pigeons, for example) and physiological changes (increased heart rate, for example) that have no clear equivalents in reinforcement.

Punishment is considered by some behavioral psychologists to be a "primary process" – a completely independent phenomenon of learning, distinct from reinforcement. Others see it as a category of negative reinforcement, creating a situation in which any punishment-avoiding behavior (even standing still) is reinforced.

=== Positive ===
Positive punishment occurs when a response produces a stimulus and that response decreases in probability in the future in similar circumstances.

- Example: A mother yells at a child when they run into the street. If the child stops running into the street, the yelling ceases. The yelling acts as positive punishment because the mother presents (adds) an unpleasant stimulus in the form of yelling.
- Example: A barefoot person walks onto a hot asphalt surface, creating pain, a positive punishment. When the person leaves the asphalt, the pain subsides. The pain acts as positive punishment because it is the addition of an unpleasant stimulus that reduces the future likelihood of the person walking barefoot on a hot surface.

=== Negative ===
Negative punishment occurs when a response produces the removal of a stimulus and that response decreases in probability in the future in similar circumstances.

- Example: A teenager comes home after curfew and the parents take away a privilege, such as cell phone usage. If the frequency of the child coming home late decreases, the privilege is gradually restored. The removal of the phone is negative punishment because the parents are taking away a pleasant stimulus (the phone) and motivating the child to return home earlier.
- Example: A child throws a temper tantrum because they want ice cream. Their mother subsequently ignores them, making it less likely the child will throw a temper tantrum in the future when they want something. The removal of attention from his mother is a negative punishment because a pleasant stimulus (attention) is taken away.

== Versus reinforcement ==
Simply put, reinforcers serve to increase behaviors whereas punishers serve to decrease behaviors; thus, positive reinforcers are stimuli that the subject will work to attain, and negative reinforcers are stimuli that the subject will work to be rid of or to end. The table below illustrates the adding and subtracting of stimuli (pleasant or aversive) in relation to reinforcement vs. punishment.

	Rewarding (pleasant) stimulus	Aversive (unpleasant) stimulus
Adding/Presenting	Positive Reinforcement	Positive Punishment
Removing/Taking Away	Negative Punishment	Negative Reinforcement

== Types of stimuli and punishers ==
=== Rewarding stimuli (pleasant) ===
A rewarding stimuli is a stimulus that is considered pleasant. For example, a child may be allowed TV time every day. Punishment often involves the removal of a rewarding stimuli if an undesired action is done. If the child were to misbehave, this rewarding stimulus of TV time would be removed which would result in negative punishment.

=== Aversive stimuli (unpleasant) ===
Aversive Stimuli, punisher, and punishing stimulus are somewhat synonymous. Punishment may be used to mean

1. An aversive stimulus
2. The occurrence of any punishing change
3. The part of an experiment in which a particular response is punished.

Some things considered aversive can become reinforcing. In addition, some things that are aversive may not be punishing if accompanying changes are reinforcing. A classic example would be mis-behavior that is 'punished' by a teacher but actually increases over time due to the reinforcing effects of attention on the student.

==== Primary punishers ====
Pain, loud noises, foul tastes, bright lights, and exclusion are all things that would pass the "caveman test" as an aversive stimulus, and are therefore primary punishers. Primary punishers can also be loss of money and receiving negative feedback from people.

==== Secondary punishers ====
The sound of someone booing, the wrong-answer buzzer on a game show, and a ticket on your car windshield are all things society has learned to think about as negative, and are considered secondary punishers.

== Effectiveness ==
Contrary to suggestions by Skinner and others that punishment typically has weak or impermanent effects, a large body of research has shown that it can have a powerful and lasting effect in suppressing the punished behavior. Furthermore, more severe punishments are more effective, and very severe ones may even produce complete suppression. However, it may also have powerful and lasting side effects. For example, an aversive stimulus used to punish a particular behavior may also elicit a strong emotional response that may suppress unpunished behavior and become associated with situational stimuli through classical conditioning. Such side effects suggest caution and restraint in the use of punishment to modify behavior. Spanking in particular has been found to have lasting side effects. Parents often use spanking to try make their child act better but there is minimal evidence suggesting that spanking is effective in doing so. Some lasting side effects of spanking include lower cognitive ability, lower self-esteem, and more mental health problems for the child. Some side effects can reach into adulthood as well such as antisocial behavior and support for punishment that involves physical force such as spanking. Punishment is more effective in increasing cooperation in high-trust societies than low-trust societies. Punishment was also more effective in countries that have stronger norms for cooperation, high in wealth, and countries that are high-democratic rather than low-democratic.

== Importance of contingency and contiguity ==
One variable affecting punishment is contingency, which is defined as the dependency of events. A behavior may be dependent on a stimulus or dependent on a response. The purpose of punishment is to reduce a behavior, and the degree to which punishment is effective in reducing a targeted behavior is dependent on the relationship between the behavior and a punishment. For example, if a rat receives an aversive stimulus, such as a shock each time it presses a lever, then it is clear that contingency occurs between lever pressing and shock. In this case, the punisher (shock) is contingent upon the appearance of the behavior (lever pressing). Punishment is most effective when contingency is present between a behavior and a punisher. A second variable affecting punishment is contiguity, which is the closeness of events in time and/or space. Contiguity is important to reducing behavior because the longer the time interval between an unwanted behavior and a punishing effect, the less effective the punishment will be. One major problem with a time delay between a behavior and a punishment is that other behaviors may present during that time delay. The subject may then associate the punishment given with the unintended behaviors, and thus suppressing those behaviors instead of the targeted behavior. Therefore, immediate punishment is more effective in reducing a targeted behavior than a delayed punishment would be. However, there may be ways to improve the effectiveness of delayed punishment, such as providing verbal explanation, reenacting the behavior, increasing punishment intensity, or other methods.

== Applications ==
=== Applied behavior analysis ===
Applied behavior analysis (ABA) practitioners will sometimes use positive or negative punishments to modify the behaviors of intellectually or developmentally disabled individuals, including members of the autistic community. Punishment is considered one of the ethical challenges to autism treatment and has led to significant controversy.

A 2017 study found that 46% of autistic people who had undergone ABA appeared to meet the criteria for post-traumatic stress disorder (PTSD), a rate 86% higher than the rate of those who had not undergone ABA (28%). According to the researcher, the rate of apparent PTSD increased after exposure to ABA regardless of the age of the patient. However, the quality of this study has been disputed by some ABA researchers.

=== Psychological manipulation ===
Braiker identified the following ways that manipulators control their victims:

- Positive reinforcement: includes praise, superficial charm, superficial sympathy (crocodile tears), excessive apologizing, money, approval, gifts, attention, facial expressions such as a forced laugh or smile, and public recognition.
- Negative reinforcement: may involve removing one from a negative situation
- Intermittent or partial reinforcement: Partial or intermittent negative reinforcement can create an effective climate of fear and doubt. Partial or intermittent positive reinforcement can encourage the victim to persist - for example in most forms of gambling, the gambler is likely to win now and again but still lose money overall.
- Punishment: includes nagging, yelling, the silent treatment, intimidation, threats, swearing, emotional blackmail, the guilt trip, sulking, crying, and playing the victim.
- Traumatic one-trial learning: using verbal abuse, explosive anger, or other intimidating behavior to establish dominance or superiority; even one incident of such behavior can condition or train victims to avoid upsetting, confronting or contradicting the manipulator.

=== Traumatic bonding ===
Traumatic bonding occurs as the result of ongoing cycles of abuse in which the intermittent reinforcement of reward and punishment creates powerful emotional bonds that are resistant to change.

=== Punishment used in stuttering therapy ===
Early studies in the late 60's to early 70's have shown that punishment via time-out (a form of negative punishment) can reduce the severity of stuttering in patients. Since the punishment in these studies was time-out which resulted in the removal of the permission to speak, speaking itself was seen as reinforcing which thus made the time-out an effective form of punishment. Some research has also shown that it is not the time-out that is considered punishing but rather the fact that the removal of the permission to speak was seen as punishing because it interrupted the individual's speech.

=== Punishment of disabled children ===
Some studies have found effective punishment techniques concerning children with disabilities, such as autism and intellectual disabilities. The targeted behaviors were self-injurious behaviors such as head banging, motor, stereotypy, aggression, emesis, or breaking the rules. Some techniques that were used are timeout, overcorrection, contingent aversive, response blocking, and response interruption and redirection (RIRD). Most punishment techniques were used alone or combined with other punishment techniques; however, the use of punishment techniques alone was less effective in reducing targeted behaviors. Timeout was used the most even though it was less effective in reducing targeted behaviors; however, contingent aversive was used the least even though it was more effective in reducing targeted behaviors. Using punishment techniques in combination with reinforcement-based interventions was more effective than a punishment technique alone or using multiple punishment techniques.

== See also ==
- Abusive power and control
- Carrot and stick
- Child grooming
- Devaluation
- Emotional blackmail
- Isolation to facilitate abuse
- Lovaas technique
- Pavlovian-instrumental transfer
- Psychological manipulation
- Punishment (in general)
- Traumatic bonding
