= Chaining =

Procedure, psychology

Chaining is a type of intervention that aims to create associations between behaviors in a behavior chain. A behavior chain is a sequence of behaviors that happen in a particular order where the outcome of the previous step in the chain serves as a signal to begin the next step in the chain. In terms of behavior analysis, a behavior chain is begun with a discriminative stimulus (S-δ) which sets the occasion for a behavior, the outcome of that behavior serves as a reinforcer for completing the previous step and as another SD to complete the next step. This sequence repeats itself until the last step in the chain is completed and a terminal reinforcer (the outcome of a behavior chain, i.e. with brushing one's teeth the terminal reinforcer is having clean teeth) is achieved. For example, the chain in brushing one's teeth starts with seeing the toothbrush, this sets the occasion to get toothpaste, which then leads to putting it on one's brush, brushing the sides and front of mouth, spitting out the toothpaste, rinsing one's mouth, and finally putting away one's toothbrush. To outline behavior chains, as done in the example, a task analysis is used.

Chaining is used to teach complex behaviors made of behavior chains that the current learner does not have in their repertoire. Various steps of the chain can be in the learner's repertoire, but the steps the learner doesn't know how to do have to be in the category of can't do instead of won't do (issue with knowing the skill not an issue of compliance). There are three different types of chaining: forward chaining, backward chaining, and total task chaining (not to be confused with a task analysis).

== Forward chaining ==
Forward chaining is a procedure where a behavior chain is learned and completed by teaching the steps in chronological order using prompting and fading. The teacher teaches the first step by presenting a distinctive stimulus to the learner. Once they complete the first step in the chain, the teacher then prompts them through the remaining steps in the chain. Once the learner is consistently completing the first step without prompting, the teacher has them complete the first and second step then prompts the learner through the remaining steps and so on until the learner is able to complete the entire chain independently. Reinforcement is delivered for completion of the step, although they do not attain the terminal reinforcer (outcome of the behavior chain) until they are prompted through the remaining steps .

== Backward chaining ==
Backward chaining is the same process as forward chaining but starts with the last step. Typically used for people with limited abilities, this process uses prompting and fading techniques to teach the last step first. The biggest benefit of using a backward chain is that the learner receives the terminal reinforcer (the outcome of the behavior chain) naturally. Backward chaining is the preferred method when teaching skills to individuals with severe delays because they complete the last step and see the direct outcome of the chain immediately rather than having to be prompted through the remaining steps to receive reinforcement.

The teacher begins by prompting the learner through the entire chain, starting with the final behavior. The teacher repeats this until the learner can perform the final step without prompting upon the discriminative stimulus being presented. Once the learner can complete the final step consistently, the penultimate step is taught while continuing the prompts for the other steps. The teacher repeats this procedure of teaching the next step while prompting the remaining ones until the learner can perform (or achieve) all the steps without prompting.
