= Errorless learning =

Instructional learning without errors

Errorless learning was an instructional design introduced by psychologist Charles Ferster in the 1950s as part of his studies on what would make the most effective learning environment. B. F. Skinner was also influential in developing the technique. Describing Skinner's 1968 work The Technology of Teaching, Rosales-Ruiz says:

In his [Skinner's] system, errors are not necessary for learning to occur. Errors are not a function of learning or vice versa nor are they blamed on the learner. Errors are a function of poor analysis of behavior, a poorly designed shaping program, moving too fast from step to step in the program, and the lack of the prerequisite behavior necessary for success in the program.

Errorless learning can also be understood at a synaptic level, using the principle of Hebbian learning ("Neurons that fire together wire together").

Many of Skinner's other students and followers continued to test the idea. In 1963, Herbert Terrace wrote a paper describing an experiment with pigeons which allows discrimination learning to occur with few or even with no responses to the negative stimulus (abbreviated S−). A negative stimulus is a stimulus associated with undesirable consequences (e.g., absence of reinforcement). In discrimination learning, an error is a response to the S−, and according to Terrace errors are not required for successful discrimination performance.

== Principles ==
A simple discrimination learning procedure is one in which a subject learns to associate one stimulus, S+ (positive stimulus), with reinforcement (e.g. food) and another, S− (negative stimulus), with extinction (e.g. absence of food). For example, a pigeon can learn to peck a red key (S+), and avoid a green key (S−). Using traditional procedures, a pigeon would be initially trained to peck a red key (S+). When the pigeon was responding consistently to the red key (S+), a green key (S−) would be introduced. At first the pigeon would also respond to the green key (S−) but gradually responses to this key would decrease, because they are not followed by food, so that they occurred only a few times or even never.

Terrace (1963) found that discrimination learning could occur without errors when the training begins early in operant conditioning and visual stimuli (S+ and S−) like colors are used that differ in terms of brightness, duration and wavelength. He used a fading procedure in which the brightness and duration differences between the S+ and the S− were decreased progressively leaving only the difference in wavelength. In other words, the S+ and S− were initially presented with different brightness and duration, i.e., the S+ would appear for 5 s and fully red, and the S− would appear for 0.5 s and dark. Gradually, over successive presentations, the duration of the S− and its brightness were gradually increased until the keylight was fully green for 5 s.

Studies of implicit memory and implicit learning from cognitive psychology and cognitive neuropsychology have provided additional theoretical support for errorless learning methods (e.g., Brooks and Baddeley, 1976, Tulving and Schacter, 1990). Implicit memory is known to be poor at eliminating errors, but can be used to compensate when explicit memory function is impaired. In experiments on amnesiac patients, errorless implicit learning was more effective because it reduced the possibility of errors "sticking" in amnesiacs' memories.

== Effects ==
The errorless learning procedure is highly effective in reducing the number of responses to the S− during training. In Terrace's (1963) experiment, subjects trained with the conventional discrimination procedure averaged over 3000 S− (errors) responses during 28 sessions of training; whereas subjects trained with the errorless procedure averaged only 25 S− (errors) responses in the same number of sessions.

Later, Terrace (1972) claimed not only that the errorless learning procedure improves long-term discrimination performance, but also that: 1) S− does not become aversive and so does not elicit "aggressive" behaviors, as it often does with conventional training; 2) S− does not develop inhibitory properties; 3) positive behavioral contrast to S+ does not occur. In other words, Terrace has claimed that the "by-products" of conventional discrimination learning do not occur with the errorless procedure.

== Limits ==
Some evidence suggests that errorless learning may not be as qualitatively different from conventional training as Terrace initially claimed. For example, Rilling (1977) demonstrated in a series of experiments that these "by-products" can occur after errorless learning, but that their effects may not be as large as in the conventional procedure; and Marsh and Johnson (1968) found that subjects given errorless training were very slow to make a discrimination reversal.

== Applications ==
Interest from psychologists studying basic research on errorless learning declined after the 1970s. However, errorless learning attracted the interest of researchers in applied psychology, and studies have been conducted with both children (e.g., educational settings) and adults (e.g. Parkinson's patients). Errorless learning continues to be of practical interest to animal trainers, particularly dog trainers.

Errorless learning has been found to be effective in helping memory-impaired people learn more effectively. The reason for the method's effectiveness is that, while those with sufficient memory function can remember mistakes and learn from them, those with memory impairment may have difficulty remembering not only which methods work, but may strengthen incorrect responses over correct responses, such as via emotional stimuli. See also the reference by Brown to its application in teaching mathematics to undergraduates.

== See also ==
- Evidence-based learning
