= Judge Rotenberg Center =

Controversial American special education institution

Judge Rotenberg Educational Center, Inc.
- Abbreviation: JRC
- Founded: 1971; 55 years ago
- Founder: Matthew Israel
- Type: Private, Special education
- Tax ID no.: 04-2489805
- Legal status: 501(c)(3)
- Location: Canton, Massachusetts, United States
- President and Executive Director: Glenda Crookes
- Board of directors: Henry Slucki (Chairman); Jeffrey Sánchez; Richard Malott; Ron van Houten; Thomas Brady; Joseph Wyatt; Margaret Uwayo; Michael Sciannamea; Jennifer Kirby
- Key people: Curtiss Houghton (Chief Financial Officer); Robert Duquette (Director of Human Resources); Ralph Antonelli (Director of Admissions); Lloyd Ferdinand (Director of Software Development); Gary Woo (Software Developer); Paul Blivess (IT Director); Nathan Blenkush (Director of Clinical Services)
- Revenue: $133,117,240 (Fiscal year ending June 30, 2025)
- Expenses: $130,746,351 (Fiscal year ending June 30, 2025)
- Staff: 1,641 employees (2024)
- Website: www.judgerc.org
- Formerly called: Behavior Research Institute (1971–1994)

The Judge Rotenberg Center (JRC) is a pseudoscientific therapeutic institution in Canton, Massachusetts, United States, whose behavior modification program targeted at people with developmental disabilities and emotional and behavioral disorders has been condemned by the United Nations special rapporteur on torture. The center is known for its use of the graduated electronic decelerator (GED), a torture device that administers electric shocks to residents.

The JRC's behavior modification program uses the methods of applied behavior analysis and relies heavily on aversion therapy. Aversives used at JRC include food deprivation, movement limitation via long-term restraints, sensory deprivation, and GED shocks. While JRC claims to rely mainly on positive behavior support and contends that aversives are used only as a last resort when positive intervention has failed, state reports have repeatedly found that aversives are used for minor infractions, and that no significant positive behavior support programs exist. While the Food and Drug Administration issued a formal ban on the GED in 2020, the device continued to be used on some residents pending an administrative stay for the duration of the COVID-19 pandemic. In July 2021, the D.C. Circuit Court of Appeals ruled that the FDA could not issue a "partial stay" but must issue a blanket ban or no ban at all, thus allowing the JRC to continue using the device. In response to this ruling, the United States Congress amended the Food, Drug, and Cosmetic Act through the Consolidated Appropriations Act of 2022. The amendments gave the FDA the authority to ban a medical device for one use regardless of approval for other uses. The FDA proposed a new ban based on its expanded authority in March 2024 and accepted public comments on the proposal through May 2024. After allowing two previous self-imposed deadlines (October 2025 and May 2026) to pass, the agency announced in July 2026 that it would make a final decision on the proposed ban by November 2026.

The Judge Rotenberg Center was founded by Matthew Israel in 1971 as the Behavior Research Institute (BRI). In 2002, JRC staff tied an autistic boy face-down to a board with four-point restraints and shocked him 31 times at the highest amperage setting. The first shock was given for failing to take off his coat when asked, and the remaining 30 shocks were given for screaming and tensing up while being shocked. The boy was later hospitalized with third degree burns and acute stress disorder, but, as neither the law nor JRC policy had been broken, no action was taken against any of the staff. In a 2007 incident, in response to a prank phone call claiming that two residents were misbehaving, JRC staff restrained and shocked the two 29 and 77 times respectively. In 2011, Matthew Israel was arraigned on charges related to the 2007 incident, though the charges were dropped after Israel resigned from his position as part of a deferred prosecution deal with the Massachusetts Attorney General.

There have been repeated attempts to shut down the center by autism, disability, and human rights rights advocates. Organizations that oppose the center include the Autistic Self Advocacy Network, Disability Rights International and Community Alliance for the Ethical Treatment of Youth. Six residents have died at the institute since it was founded in 1971.

== History ==
=== Background ===
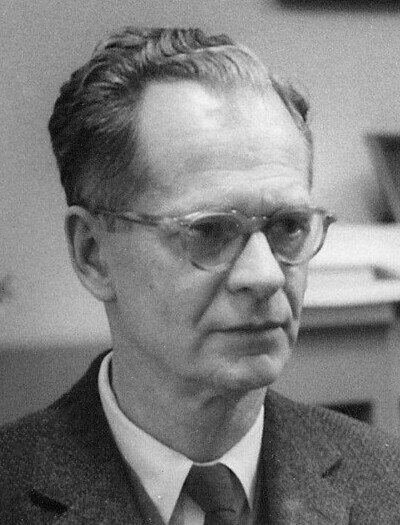
Matthew Israel was inspired by the work of B. F. Skinner (pictured), whom he studied under at Harvard University.

In 1957, a group of researchers interested in applications for B. F. Skinner's theory of operant conditioning – an approach to behavior modification based on providing rewards or other reinforcing stimuli – founded the Society for the Experimental Analysis of Behavior. In 1967, the group established the Journal of Applied Behavior Analysis (JABA) to focus on the application of applied behavior analysis (ABA) to the "socially important problems" of people with autism and other developmental disabilities. Researchers for JABA believed that because there was data supporting the effectiveness of the use of aversives on disabled people, use of aversives was "science-based" and that arguments based on human values were irrelevant. In 1974, a dissenting group of researchers founded the Association for the Education and Treatment of the Severely and Profoundly Handicapped (AESEPH; later renamed TASH), which distinguished itself through its opposition to the use of aversives and involuntary commitment.

Matthew Israel enrolled at Harvard University in 1950, where he studied under Skinner and earned undergraduate and doctoral degrees in psychology. In 1966, Israel founded the Association for Social Design (ASD), an organization intent on building a network of communes based on the behavior modification principles described in Skinner's utopian novel Walden Two. Under Israel's management, the Boston chapter of the ASD attempted to establish two urban communes – one in 1967 in Arlington, Massachusetts and another in 1969 in Boston's South End – though both dissolved within weeks. In 1970, Israel moved to Providence, Rhode Island, where he ran behavior modification programs for children with autism and behavioral disorders at the Patrick I. O'Rourke Children's Center and the Emma Pendleton Bradley Hospital.

=== Foundation of the Behavior Research Institute ===
In 1971, when federal funding for his program at the O'Rourke Children's Center ran out, Israel established the Behavior Research Institute (BRI) at the Fogarty Center. As a result of the difficulties he had encountered while attempting to establish a Walden Two community, Israel chose to instead focus his efforts on establishing a school, though he maintained that an autonomous community could eventually develop out of the BRI. In 1972, Israel established the Behavior Research Institute Camp at Matthew Rossi's private home on Prudence Island; the camp initially housed two adolescents: one with autism and Rossi's son, who had schizophrenia. Rossi later wrote in 1976 that Israel's treatment provided no benefit for his son, alleged that he created "miserable situations", and accused Israel of manipulating other parents.

In February 1973, after several months of study, the Human Rights Committee of the Rhode Island Planning and Advisory Council on Developmental Disabilities published a report on the BRI raising concerns over the institute's unchecked usage of aversives. However, Massachusetts family court judge Michael DeCiantis ordered the Massachusetts Department of Mental Health to continue to pay the institute's $16,000 tuition, stating that he was particularly impressed by the institute's before-and-after videos. In response to allegations of abuse in the Human Rights Committee report, Rhode Island Behavioral Health Services for Children and Youth asked a team of ABA researchers led by Richard B. Stuart to conduct site visits to the BRI. Contrary to the Human Rights Committee expectations, Stuart's team praised the BRI, reporting that it was effectively run and well conceived, though they recommended better oversight regarding the institute's usage of corporal punishment.

After the BRI raised its tuition in 1976, the state of Rhode Island transferred all eleven children that were attending the institute with funding from the state to the Behavioral Development Center in Providence. The Behavioral Development Center was run by June Groden, who had previously collaborated with Israel before separating due to disagreements over educational practices and the use of aversives. In June 1978, June Ciric wrote to Rhode Island Governor J. Joseph Garrahy criticizing the state's decision to license the institution and alleging cases of child abuse and death at the institute. In response, the state governments of Massachusetts and New Jersey both investigated the institution, concluding that while Ciric's son had been hospitalized as a result of the institute's use of handcuffs, the allegations of abuse were unsubstantiated.

=== Expansion into and withdrawal from California ===
==== Foundation and licensure ====
On June 17, 1975, the California chapter of the National Society for Autistic Children (NSAC) secured three months of funding for a California branch of the BRI from the North Los Angeles County Regional Center (NLACRC). The decision raised objections from both the NSAC and the Los Angeles County chapter of the NSAC, which had both rescinded their endorsements of the BRI by May 1975. In November, the board of the NLACRC followed suit by unanimously voting to withdraw its support for the BRI and urging its executives to actively oppose funding by the state. On April 30, 1976, the BRI opened its first California group home in Van Nuys without a license to operate a group home or a license to use aversives; in addition, Matthew Israel also did not have a license to practice psychology in the state of California.

On December 27, 1976, the board of directors of the NSAC voted to terminate Israel's membership after concluding that Israel had been operating the BRI and practicing as a clinical psychologist without obtaining a license in the state of California. In a contrasting decision, the California Board of Medical Quality Assurance determined in their investigation that "the Board was unable to confirm any violations of law related to the practice of Psychology". On January 17, 1977, the California Department of Health denied Israel's application for a license to operate a group home, writing that Israel had "shown a disregard for the law" by operating his program and practicing psychology without first obtaining a license. The department also criticized the institution's use of aversion therapy, writing that BRI used unjustifiably painful aversives beyond necessity and without adequate scientific backing, guidelines or supervision. (Note: "Our own review of your program has led us to conclude that your use and controls on the use of painful aversives would be considered unsatisfactory by professionals actively engaged in and knowledgeable in the use of aversive therapy on the following grounds: a) the aversive intervenors which you use or evince a willingness to use are unjustifiably harsh; b) there is a lack of meaningful peer review of your choice of treatment; c) pain infliction and other physically coercive techniques are employed when it is not necessary to do so; d) alternatives to the use of painful aversives are not adequately explored; e) individual aversive techniques are continued in use beyond apparent effectiveness; f) painful aversives are used to teach a behavior that the child does not presently have, rather than limited to the purpose of suppressing existing behavior; g) record keeping of the administration and effect of, and the preconditions to the use of aversives are inadequate; h) again, there is inadequate supervision of treatment choice and utilization by qualified staff.") The department then issued a cease and desist order against the institution, effective January 31, 1977.

The institution responded to the cease and desist order by formally severing ties with the BRI and re-opening the school as a daycare run as a privately funded parent-owned cooperative, with Judy Weber serving as the corporation's executive director and Matthew Israel serving as a consultant. In August 1977, the renamed BRI of California, with legal representation from former California governor Pat Brown's law firm, applied for funding and a license to operate a group home. At the time, the institution's board of directors also included Mark Adams, an attorney for California governor Jerry Brown. On October 25, the Department of Health granted the BRI of California a one-year license to operate a group home for six children and adults, despite objections from the CSAC. The institution also received the only permit ever granted by the state of California to use physical aversives, and the highest funding rate of any community facility in California at $35,000 a year per child (approximately equivalent to $186,000 in 2025).

==== Christopher Hirsch incident and allegations of abuse ====
On Friday, October 28, 1978, Matthew Israel pinched Christopher Hirsch's feet for thirty minutes as punishment for soiling his pants. Hirsch, a 12-year-old autistic student at the institute, was reportedly left with bruises and blistering that left him unable to walk. The following Monday, Kathy Corwin, a BRI treatment worker who witnessed the incident, resigned and filed a child abuse complaint with the district attorney. The California attorney general's office initiated an investigation into the complaint, but the investigation was later dismissed due to insufficient evidence. On November 27, 1978, the California Department of Social Services (CDSS) informed the NLACRC of the incident and recommended that the organization end its funding for the BRI. This led to the NLACRC board voting, on January 10, 1979, to discontinue funding for the BRI, concluding that the institution "was seriously jeopardizing the rights, health, safety, and welfare of children at the facility". The BRI appealed the NLACRC's decision and a Fair Hearing – a mediation process in the state of California involving independent hearing officers acting as judges – was scheduled for March 14 and 15.

On March 29, the Fair Hearing panel issued a ruling in favor of the BRI, though they also found that the administrative procedures surrounding the use of aversives at the BRI had lacked rigorous controls. The following day a special permit was issued to the BRI, allowing the institution to provide physical aversives under the conditions that it hire a full-time, behaviorally trained, employee with a doctorate; comply with California draft guidelines on the use of aversives; and establish a national review and evaluation team.

Following the incident, an Orange County Superior Court judge awarded temporary custody to Hirsch's father and issued a court order protecting Hirsch from further pinching. Two violations of the court order were later alleged by the NLACRC and Hirsch's father: NLACRC staff members reportedly witnessed Hirsch being pinched and Hirsch's father found further bruising on Hirsch's body, which the institute claimed were the result of "muscle squeezes" applied as an alternative to pinching.

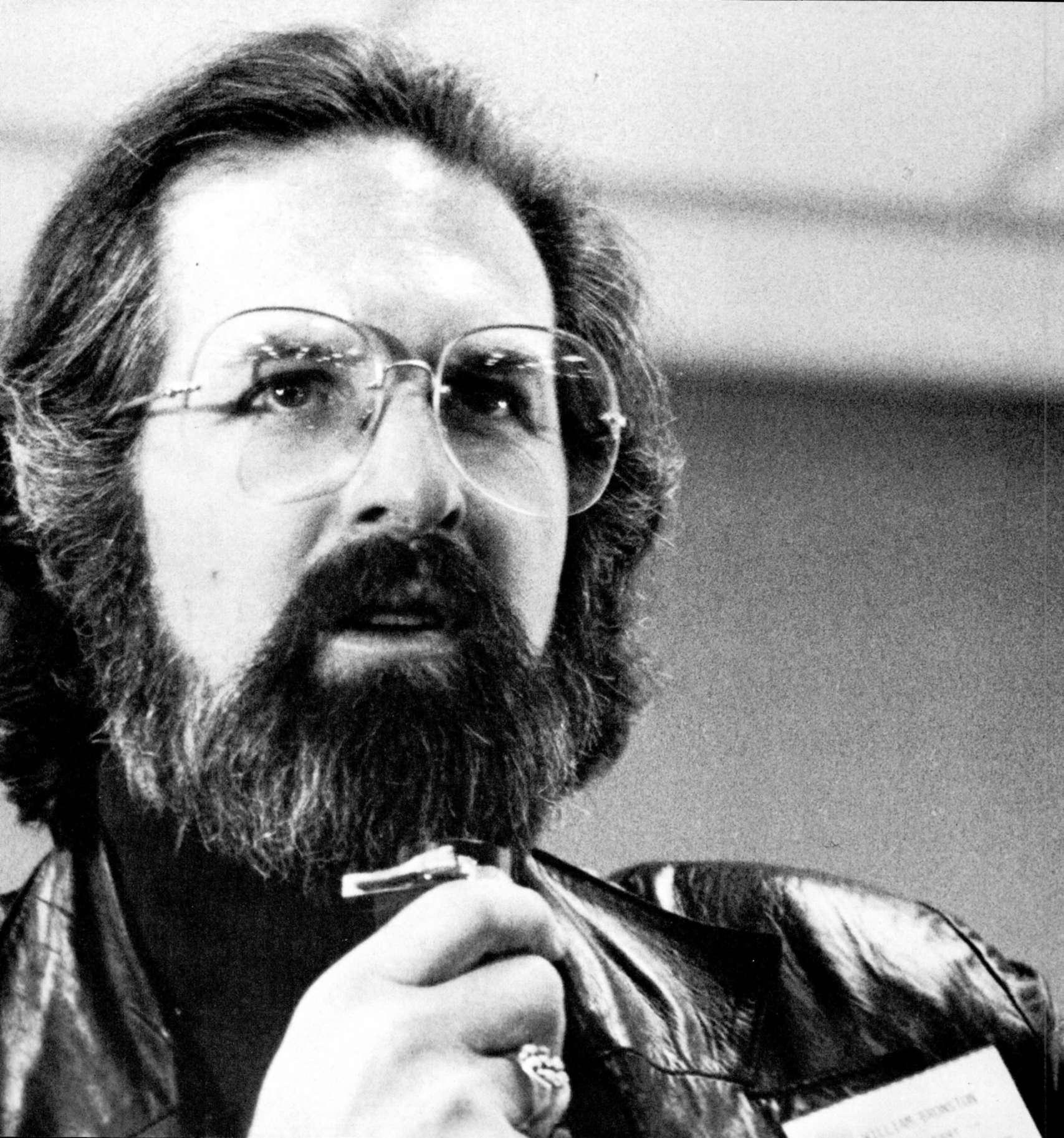
In an influential internal memo, William Bronston urged the state of California to end its relationship with the Behavior Research Institute.

In late April, William Bronston, the chief of medical services at the California Department of Developmental Services (California DDS), visited the facility with CDSS medical director Robert Rafael; from their visit, the two concluded that the institution was acting in "flagrant violation of both the spirit and the intent of the protection order". In a memo to California DDS director David Loberg, Bronston recommended that the state immediately and permanently end its support for the institution, writing that the BRI obsessively used aversive techniques where there was no need, failed to provide adequate educational services, and lacked any oversight or accountability. The NLACRC appealed the Fair Hearing panel's decision and on May 11, Loberg upheld the regional center's decision to discontinue funding for the BRI; the BRI and parents appealed Loberg's decision to the Los Angeles County Superior Court. On May 24, on the recommendation of Loberg, CDSS director Marion Woods revoked the portions of the BRI's license that sanctioned aversion therapy.

==== Death of Danny Aswad and investigation ====
On July 18, 1981, Danny Aswad, a 14-year-old autistic boy, died at the BRI while restrained face-down to a bed, despite the institute not being authorized to use restraints on its residents at the time. Aswad had previously had a rod surgically implanted in his back to treat degenerative back disease resulting from his treatment there. The coroner's report concluded that Aswad had died of "mental retardation" and "cerebral malformation" and recorded his death as from natural causes.

California launched an investigation into the institute and its practices which revealed various abuses against the residents, both physical and psychological. Residents were beaten, restrained, humiliated, and not adequately fed or cared for. Residents often bore extreme bruising, which staff had been trained to conceal from doctors and family members. As a result of the investigation, the institute was banned from using physical aversives, as well as from using restraints and withholding meals as punishment. Additionally, Matthew Israel was banned from entering the facility. Judy Weber, who would go on to become Israel's second wife and was the mother of one of the institute's residents, took over the operation of the center and later renamed it Tobinworld. The center denied all allegations made by the state report.

=== BRI in Rhode Island and Massachusetts ===
As early as 1979, authorities in New York State had published two reports on the Behavior Research Institute in which signs of physical and mental abuse were documented. One report found that the institute's methods were only effective through the means of coercion, and that the residents relapsed into their old behavior as soon as the immediate threat of punishment was gone. While corporal punishment was against the law in Massachusetts, the institute was granted special permission to use aversives in 1983. The institute was welcomed by some state officials due to its near-zero rejection rate.

In 1980, 25-year-old Robert Cooper died of a hemorrhagic bowel obstruction. The institution was criticized for driving him to the hospital in a private vehicle rather than calling for an ambulance. Then in 1993, the Massachusetts Department of Mental Retardation said that the institution had "repeatedly failed to comply with a number of state regulations" and threatened to withdraw its certification.

=== Judge Rotenberg Center ===
In 1985, Vincent Milletich, a 22-year-old autistic man, died at the institute. After an epileptic seizure, he was restrained and forced to wear a white noise emitting sensory deprivation helmet. The Rhode Island medical examiner found "[Milletich] died of asphyxiation but said it was not known what cut off his oxygen supply." Milletich had a history of epileptic seizures, and had been made to wear the helmet as punishment for "making inappropriate sounds". The judge who presided over a hearing on Milletich's death declared that two staff doctors were negligent for approving the therapy, and that the center's director, Matthew Israel, "was negligent in authorizing the use of this helmet without having an expert in helmet construction design the helmet or subject it to a safety inspection." Milletich's mother said that she did not want charges pressed against the institute, but did sue the JRC for $10 million.

In 1985, following the death of Milletich, the Massachusetts Office of Children issued an order to close the BRI. The BRI counter-sued the Office of Children, and after seeing the institute's presentation of one of its worst self-harming residents, Judge Ernest Rotenberg sided with the BRI. In the settlement that followed, the Office for Children agreed to pay $580,000 to the BRI in legal fees. The head of the Office of Children later resigned and was sued by a group of parents for $15 million, who claimed that her attempt the shut down the center was a violation of their children's rights.

In 1987, Abigail Gibson, a 29-year-old woman with a seizure disorder, was detained at the BRI and subject to regular physical aversives by the program there. She had a heart attack in her bed and died two days later at Sturdy Memorial Hospital.

In 1990, Linda Cornelison, a 19-year-old non-verbal and intellectually disabled resident, died of complications related to a ruptured bowel. At the time of her death, Cornelison was on a "contingent food program" where food was withheld as a punishment for undesired behavior. In the days leading up to her death, Cornelison's expressions of pain were interpreted as misbehavior by staff, who administered 56 physical aversives over five hours before calling an ambulance. Cornelison was unconscious when the ambulance arrived. An investigation of Cornelison's death, conducted by the Massachusetts Department of Mental Retardation, reported that the treatment was "inhumane beyond all reason" and violated "universal standards of human decency", but failed to find enough evidence to link the JRC's treatment of Cornelison to her death. However, a Massachusetts court found in 1995 that the JRC had exhibited negligence. At the time of her death, Cornelison had been a resident of the institute for seven years, and had been subjected to 88,719 aversives.

In 1994, the BRI officially changed its name to the Judge Rotenberg Educational Center in honor of Judge Ernest Rotenberg, who had overseen the BRI's 1987 settlement with the state of Massachusetts.

In the mid-1990s, the Massachusetts Department of Mental Retardation launched a second attempt to shut down the center. A judge described the case as a "war of harassment" against Matthew Israel and ruled against the attempt to close the center and ordered the state to pay $1.5 million to the JRC in compensation for legal fees and other costs. Additionally, he stripped the agency of its power to regulate the center and awarded it to the courts, and the commissioner of the Department of Mental Retardation was forced to resign.

The JRC moved from its original location near Providence, Rhode Island, to its current facilities in Canton, Massachusetts, in 1996.

In 1998, a disabled 16-year-old named Silverio Gonzalez died in the institute's custody. He was housed there for 11 months before making an attempt to escape by jumping from a transport bus; he died from head trauma from the fall.

In 2011, after being indicted on criminal charges related to the abuse of residents, Israel was forced to resign from his position as director of the Judge Rotenberg Center as part of a deferred prosecution agreement. Six residents have died of preventable causes at the center since it opened in 1971.

As the result of a 2011 ruling by the Massachusetts Department of Early Education and Care, governor Deval Patrick's administration imposed regulations grandfathering existing residents whose current treatment plan included use of the GED but otherwise banning it: new residents enrolled into the JRC were no longer allowed, by law, to receive the GED as part of their plan.

==== 2007 hoax phone call ====
After the center received a phone call from a purported supervisor alleging that two residents had misbehaved earlier that evening, staff woke them from their beds, restrained them, and repeatedly gave them electric shocks. One of the residents received 77 shocks and the other received 29, with one of the residents having to be treated for burns. The phone call was later found to be a hoax perpetrated by a former resident. In December 2007, the center was found by the Massachusetts Department of Early Education and Care to have been abusive towards residents and having failed to protect their health.

The incident led to two investigations – one by the federal government, and one by the state of Massachusetts. While the investigation was ongoing, Matthew Israel ordered tapes destroyed, despite a court order to keep them. In May 2011, Israel was indicted on charges of child endangerment, acting as an accessory after the fact, and obstruction of justice for misleading a grand jury regarding the JRC's destruction of tapes. In 2011, Israel was forced to resign his position at JRC in a deferred prosecution deal with the Massachusetts State Attorney General's office.

==== Andre McCollins ====
External video
- Video clip showing Andre McCollins being shocked (2014-08-05). CBS Evening News. Retrieved 2023-11-11 – via YouTube.

In 2002, Andre McCollins, an autistic teenager from New York City, was restrained on a four-point board and shocked 31 times over the course of seven hours. The first shock was given after he did not take off his coat when asked and the subsequent thirty shocks were given as punishments for screaming and tensing up while being shocked. In the video, McCollins can be heard shouting "[s]omeone, help me, please!" The JRC staff listed this as a "major disruptive behavior", for which he was administered another GED shock. The day after the incident, McCollins' mother had to drive him to the hospital, as he was unable to speak and had multiple burns covering his body. The doctor diagnosed him with acute stress disorder as a direct result of the center's aversives. His mother subsequently claimed that "[t]here is no counseling for the [residents] there... and the staff there lied to [me] all these years..."

In 2012, a video of the incident was released as part of a lawsuit by McCollins' mother, which was settled for an undisclosed sum.

== Behavior modification ==
The Judge Rotenberg Center provides behavioral treatment using the methodologies of applied behavior analysis (ABA) and relies heavily on aversion therapy, with treatment directed exclusively towards promoting normalization. Aversives used to modify behavior include: food deprivation, restraint, solitary confinement, and GED skin shocks. While the center often claims that it uses aversives only as last resort against self-harm and aggression, these claims have been repeatedly refuted. Reports by multiple government agencies have found that the center regularly uses aversives on children with no history of self-harm or aggression, often for minor infractions. Several former residents of the center who used to be on the GED have successfully transitioned to positive behavior support programs elsewhere. There is medical consensus that positive-only support is both safer and more effective than the use of aversives.

=== Aversives ===
==== Contingent skin shocks ====
A patent illustration of the GED

The center has stated that the GED was only used as a last resort to prevent violent or self-injurious behavior when positive behavior support had failed. However, a 2006 report by the New York State Education Department found that the device was regularly used when there was no threat of serious physical harm or injury, including for:

- Failing to be neat
- Wrapping one's foot around the leg of a chair
- Stopping work for more than ten seconds
- Closing one's eyes for more than five seconds
- Minor acts of noncompliance

Other reported reasons for administering shocks included:

- Using the bathroom without permission
- Urinating on oneself after being refused the right to use the bathroom
- Screaming while being shocked
- Attempting to remove the GED

The report also found that despite the center's claims, no significant positive behavioral support program existed.

Additionally, the report found that the GED could be programmed to give automated skin shocks in response to targeted unwanted behaviors. For example, some residents were made to sit on GED seats that would automatically administer skin shocks for the target behavior of standing up, while others wore waist holsters that would administer skin shocks if the resident pulled a hand out of the holster. Shocks were administered continuously until the target behavior stopped occurring. The center did not have approval from the Food and Drug Administration (FDA) to use the device in this way.

An FDA investigation found that some parents and guardians were pressured into giving consent to put their child on the GED, that they were not provided with accurate information about the device's risks, and that other options were not exhausted before resorting to the GED. The agency also found that the GED could cause both physical and psychological harm, including pain, burns, tissue damage, depression, fear, and aggression. Furthermore, they concluded that the GED device may have caused one resident to enter a catatonic state, and that it can in some cases worsen the very behaviors that it claims to treat.

Greg Miller, a former teacher's assistant at the JRC, reported that staff were expected to administer shocks without consideration for the circumstances in which the behavior occurred. Staff were monitored by cameras, and feared losing their jobs if they refused to deliver the expected shocks. "There were no exceptions" he said, "we had to follow court-approved orders." Residents were made to wear the GED devices at all hours, even during showers and sleep. Residents report that they were sometimes awoken by shocks in the night, which were administered for reasons including nighttime incontinence, tensing up while asleep, and having broken a rule earlier in the day. Residents would also be shocked if they failed to stay awake at daytime. One resident reported that after being shocked while asleep, staff would not explain to her why she was shocked. After the incident, the fear of being shocked in her sleep produced extreme insomnia.

It was not explained to me why I got this shock. I was terrified and angry. I was crying. I kept asking why? And they kept telling me 'No talking out'... After this incident I really stopped sleeping. Every time I closed my eyes they would jump open, anticipating that jolt somewhere in my body.

— Anonymous former resident

William Pelham, a behavioral specialist and the Center for Children and Families at the State University of New York at Buffalo's director, argued that the center's use of electric shocks was harmful and unnecessary. "People don't use...shock anymore because they don't need to. It is not the standard of care. There are alternative procedures that do not involve aversives like electric shock." Matthew Israel has cited Ole Ivar Lovaas's use of a cattle prod on children with autism as justification for the center's use of electric skin shocks, and at the time of the ban, the JRC was the only institution in the United States still using electric skin shocks as aversives.

==== Contingent food program ====
In the contingent food program, a resident's food is withheld to be used as a reward for good behavior. If a resident fails to meet all the goals laid out for them by the JRC each meal (such as obedience, docility, etc), they are made to discard the unearned, excess, food. If the remaining food fails to meet the resident's daily minimum calorie intake (which may be as little as 20% of their prescribed calories), non-preferred make up food is dispensed to bring them up to the minimum. The non-preferred make up food is designed to be noxious so as to punish the resident; for example, it may be mashed up and sprinkled with liver powder. A 2006 investigation of the JRC concluded that the contingent food program posed an "unnecessary risk" to the residents' growth and development.

==== Sensory deprivation ====
A common sensory deprivation punishment involves forcing a resident to wear a spiked helmet that restricts vision and hearing (through the use of white noise and tones designed to cause extreme pain) for an extended period of time. The resident may also be restrained and subjected to other aversives during this time. In 1981, a resident died of asphyxiation during this procedure after a staff member slipped a plastic bag over their head and taped it to their neck, believing that 'asphyxiation therapy' would cure them, though the punishment continues to be used.

At least one resident was subjected to a procedure called "isolation-deprivation" in which he was restrained by the wrists and ankles for 24 hours and boxes were stacked so as to prevent him from seeing anything in the room. During this time he received only lettuce (dipped in urine) with rotten 6-month old mayonnaise to eat. On some occasions he was not allowed to use the bathroom and was forced to soil his pants and consume the results. Furthermore, staff were directed to pinch and cut his feet once per hour and spray him with water whenever they walked by.

==== Movement limitation ====
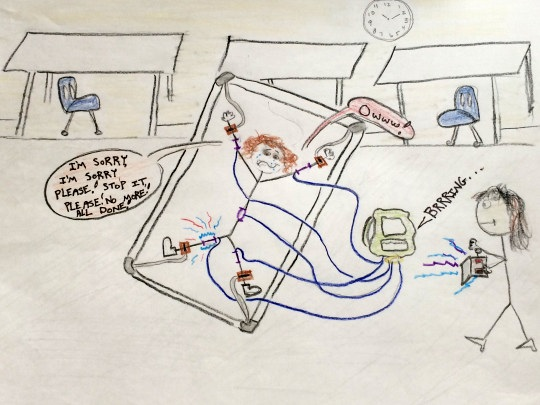
In an illustration by a former resident, a resident pleads for mercy while receiving GED shocks, restrained to a four-point board.

The use of long term restraints is common at the JRC. Many residents are required to carry their own "restraint bags", which contain the materials required to restrain them. Commonly used restraints include the four-point board and the five-point restraint chair. Restraints may be used alone, or in combination with other aversives. For example, one resident's behavior plan specified that he was to receive five GED shocks while restrained to a four-point board as a consequence for pulling the fire alarm.

==== Behavior rehearsal lessons ====
In a behavior rehearsal lesson, a resident is provoked, tricked, or coerced into exhibiting a specific target behavior (e.g. eating nonfood items, destruction of property) so that the target behavior may be punished. If the resident refuses to perform the target behavior, they are punished for noncompliance, but if they perform the target behavior then they are punished much more harshly for breaking the rules – there is no way for the resident to escape punishment. The resident is repeatedly challenged to perform the behavior, and the lesson does not end until they sit perfectly still for ten minutes. The JRC contends that behavior rehearsal lessons are an effective way of reducing "high risk, low frequency" behaviors. As of 2006, at least nine residents at the JRC were approved for behavior rehearsal lessons.

=== Rewards ===
In addition to punishments, residents of the center are given the opportunity to earn rewards. State reports have found that despite the institute's claims, its reward programs are minimal. Things considered rewards at the JRC may include verbal praise, the opportunity to look out a window, and sometimes food. A child who cries is not to be given comfort, as this is considered a reward, and the child may be punished for crying. One reward that a resident may win is the opportunity to visit the "Big Rewards Store" (BRS). The BRS contains a pool table and various arcade games, and is the only place in the center that residents may socialize freely.

We had to wait until we were in BRS to communicate with others. That was the only time you really laughed, had fun, hung around with your friends. Because usually, you can't talk to them.

— Isabel Cedeño, former student

== Investigations ==
In its 2006 Private Special Education School Program Review Report of Findings, the Massachusetts Department of Education found that unsigned Individualized Education Programs (IEPs) were being utilized for residents at JRC, and that the center did not have a written policy indicating that it must obtain consent before revising or changing an IEP. Multiple investigations and lawsuits have been brought against the center throughout its history.

=== 1982 report ===
In 1979, a staff member resigned and asked the district attorney to file child abuse charges against the institute, alleging that he had observed abuse there. On the prompting of various former staff, residents, and concerned family members, the CDSS launched an investigation into the institution. The ensuing investigation revealed multiple abuses by the institute including: improper and unsafe use of restraints, punishments designed to humiliate the residents, failure to provide proper nutrition, failure to provide proper medical care, and severe bruising/lacerations/scars from aversive interventions. In a 1982 report on the investigation, the CDSS documented various violations and abuses that had occurred at the institute. As a result of the investigation, the state of California revoked the institute's license to use aversives and forbade Matthew Israel from setting foot on the property.

==== Physical abuse ====
The investigation found that residents had received "excessive bruises" from "excessive and unnecessary aversives". Residents had cuts, scars, scabs, and open wounds from the use of aversives. Furthermore, staff took action to disguise these injuries from doctors and family members; doctor's appointments were sometimes postponed due to the presence of excessive bruising, and aversive interventions were put on hold before scheduled visits with family for "public relations purposes". Residents were made to wear long sleeves to cover up the injuries, and social service employees were on some occasions denied the right to adequately inspect them for bruises.

Residents were often put in positions where there was no way for them to avoid receiving an aversive: for example, deaf children were punished for failing to comply with verbal commands. Residents were also forced to take part in the aforementioned behavior rehearsal lessons where they were punished regardless of whether or not they behaved correctly. Additionally, residents were regularly spanked for crying in response to punishment. The report found that at least one resident's behavior substantially worsened at the institute due to "improper treatment" and "unprofessional use of aversives".

==== Humiliation ====
The report found that staff pinched residents to make them repeat phrases created by the staff, and threatened residents with the use of aversives if they did not comply with the staff's arbitrary demands. One resident was made to eat dinner outside with his arms restrained by his sides; he had to eat from a plate of food that had been placed on the ground. Other residents were deprived of the right to sleep in a bed. One was forced to sleep in a kneeling position while tied to a piece of furniture, while another was made to sleep on the floor with his arms restrained to nearby fixtures. Residents were sometimes forced to soil themselves when staff refused to let them use the bathroom.

==== Restraints ====
Residents were restrained for punishment, as well as for the personal convenience and sexual gratification of staff. Residents were restrained in unsafe ways, and sometimes received cuts, bruises, and other injuries. In 1981, a fourteen-year boy old died at the institute while restrained face down to a four-point board and tortured. The institute was not authorized to use restraints on any resident at this time, and continued to do so even after being informed that it was acting illegally.

==== Record keeping and retaliation ====
The institute was found to have removed records, making them inaccessible to investigators and family, and to have denied to family members and investigators the right to view records. In many cases, the institute's records were inaccurate. Examples include: denying a resident food as punishment while recording that he had been fed, recording that restraints had been checked when they had not been checked, and failing to properly record the administration of aversives. The institute retaliated against people who complained about their practices and refused to let the CDSS investigate those complaints. Parents were told that their children would be expelled if they questioned or complained about the institute.

==== Before-and-after video ====
The investigation found that residents were provoked into violent and aggressive behavior as part of the filming of a before-and-after video, where staged clips of the residents responding to provocation were shown as examples of how they had behaved before treatment. The residents were then taken off aversive therapy, rewarded heavily for several days, and asked to perform only tasks that placed little demand on them so that a video could be produced to show how they behaved after treatment. This film is often shown to parents of prospective residents and to reporters to convince them of the benefits of the institute.

== Opposition ==
There have been repeated attempts to shut down the center by autism rights advocates, disability rights advocates, and human rights advocates. Other notable people who have opposed the center include Ari Ne'eman, Shain Neumeier and Ly Xīnzhèn M. Zhǎngsūn Brown. Organizations that oppose the center include the Autistic Self Advocacy Network, Disability Rights International, and Community Alliance for the Ethical Treatment of Youth.

=== Condemnation for torture ===
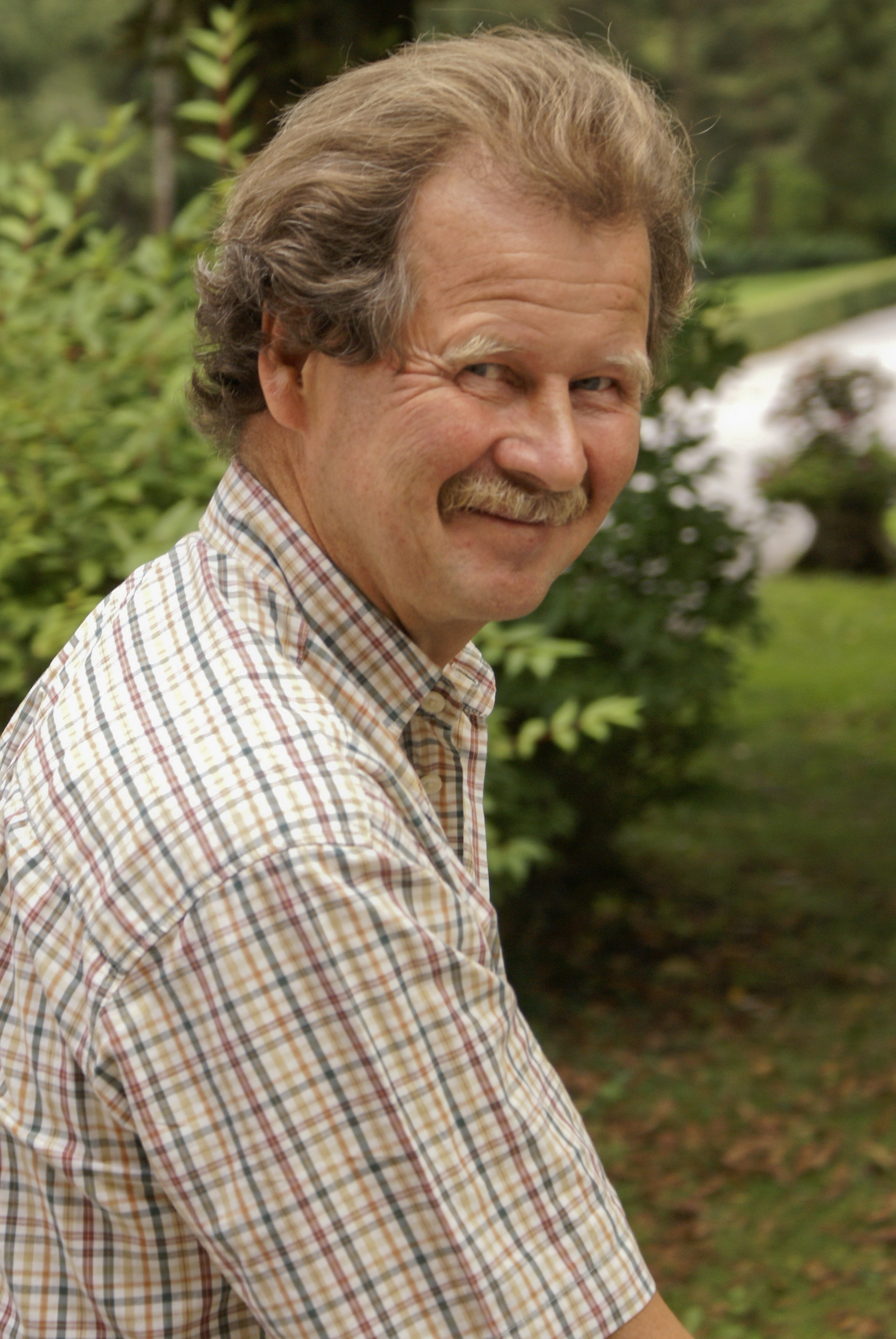
In 2013, Manfred Nowak, the United Nations Special Rapporteur on Torture, released a report describing the treatment of students at the institute as a violation of the UN Convention Against Torture.

In 2010, Disability Rights International filed an appeal with the office of the United Nations Special Rapporteur on Torture, stating they believed the residents were being subjected to human rights abuses due to the center's use of aversives. Manfred Nowak, the UN Special Rapporteur on Torture at the time, sent what he described as "an urgent appeal to the U.S. government asking them to investigate." In 2013, the Special Rapporteur declared that the rights of the students at the Judge Rotenberg Center had been violated under the United Nations Convention Against Torture.

=== Industry criticism ===
In November 2022, the Association for Behavior Analysis International (ABAI), an ABA industry trade group, adopted a position statement condemning the use of aversive electric shocks, although said statement did not mention the JRC by name. It read, in part, "In accordance with these values, we strongly oppose the use of contingent electric skin shock (CESS) under any condition." In June 2023, members of the ABAI task force assigned to investigate the use of aversive electric shocks publicly issued a report that conflicted with the position statement, claiming that shocks could be used ethically in some situations and that neither shocks nor punishment in general inherently violated the ethical standards adopted by ABAI and the Behavior Analyst Certification Board. The report was a revised version of one the task force distributed to ABAI membership in September 2022. ABAI has platformed the JRC at its annual conferences, both in the years before and the years since it issued the 2022 position statement. As of the fiscal year ending June 30, 2025, three of the JRC's board members — Richard Malott, Ronald van Houten, and Henry Slucki — were closely tied to ABAI (Malott being a cofounder and past president, Van Houten being an ABAI fellow, and Slucki being a former certification committee chair). ABAI also distributed a continuing-education webinar presented by JRC board member Margaret Uwayo in March 2025.

In 2022, two other ABA industry groups, the Association of Professional Behavior Analysts and the European Association for Behaviour Analysis, issued position statements rejecting the use of aversive electric shocks in all situations. Like the ABAI position statement, neither mentioned the JRC by name.

=== FDA banning of the GED ===
In April 2014, the FDA announced a public hearing where a panel of neurological device experts would consider whether or not the FDA should issue a ban of electric shock aversive conditioning devices such as the GED. In April 2016, the FDA took the further step of formally proposing a regulatory ban on electric shock aversive conditioning devices. In 2020 the FDA issued the final rule banning the GED with only minor changes from the 2016 draft. The device was the third medical device ever banned by the FDA in the organization's history. However, in March 2020 the FDA issued an administrative stay pending the end of the COVID-19 pandemic, which allowed the center to continue using shock on "individuals who would need a physician-directed plan" indefinitely, as the pandemic limited physician contact with many residents. In July 2021, the D.C. Circuit Court of Appeals ruled that the FDA could not issue a "partial stay" but must issue either a blanket ban or no ban at all, which allowed the JRC to continue using the device while awaiting further judgement. In response to this ruling, the United States Congress amended the Food, Drug, and Cosmetic Act through the Consolidated Appropriations Act of 2022. The amendments gave the FDA the authority to ban a medical device for a particular use irrespective of its approval for other uses. The FDA proposed a new ban based on its expanded authority in March 2024 and accepted public comments on the proposal through May 2024. As of July 2026, the agency has not acted on its proposal, despite previous self-imposed deadlines of October 2025 and May 2026. In a May 2026 statement to Disability Scoop, United States Department of Health and Human Services spokesperson Andrew Nixon said the FDA was still considering comments received. An unnamed government spokesperson did not respond to a June 2026 request for comment submitted by a Stat reporter. In July 2026, the FDA announced a new self-imposed deadline of November 2026.

=== Legislative responses ===
As of 2007, bills to ban aversives had been introduced in every Massachusetts legislative session since the late 1980s. However, none passed due to a combination of lobbying from the JRC and the protests of parents.

Former Massachusetts state Representative Jeffrey Sánchez (whose nephew is housed at the JRC) is a major proponent of the JRC and their practices. During his time in office (which began in 2003 and ended after he lost his 2018 re-election bid), Sánchez repeatedly opposed legislation that would have prohibited the JRC from using electric shocks or other aversives. He claimed they were a more humane and effective means of preventing his nephew from harming himself than constant physical restraint or sedation. Sánchez has served on the JRC's board of directors since the organization's fiscal year ending June 30, 2021.

In November 2025, the General Court of Massachusetts' Joint Committee on Children, Families and Persons with Disabilities held a hearing focused on two pending bills — H.240 (which would set up a state licensure system for use of the GED) and H.245 (which would, amongst other things, prohibit the use of pain-inducing aversives, such as hitting, pinching, and electric shocks). During the hearing, a former JRC resident alleged she and others were abused by staff, both with and without the GED, and that the GED suppressed her self-injurious behaviors without addressing the reasons behind them or eliminating them in the long term. Also during the hearing, retired University of Delaware professor Nancy Weiss repeated allegations of abuse shared with her by former residents, including an allegation that a staff member sexually assaulted a resident while blocking a security camera and later shocked them for recounting the assault. The JRC denied all allegations of abuse to local news outlet MassLive.

=== Lawsuits ===
Multiple parents and former residents have filed lawsuits against the JRC. In 2006, the family of Evelyn Nicholson sued the center over the use of electric shocks, claiming that the treatment was inhumane and violated her civil rights. The lawsuit was later settled for $65,000. The mother of Andre McCollins sued the center, settling in 2012 for an undisclosed sum.

== Corporate affairs ==
=== Board of directors ===
As of the fiscal year ending June 30, 2025, the below individuals sat on the JRC's board of directors.

- Henry Slucki — Slucki is a retired psychologist who formerly worked as a senior research associate for the USC Keck School of Medicine's department of psychiatry and behavioral sciences. Slucki taught at USC for more than 50 years and has publicly spoken about his experiences as a Holocaust survivor.
- Jeffrey Sánchez — Sánchez is a former Massachusetts state representative (2003 to 2018) whose nephew is housed at the JRC. He is a staunch proponent of electric-shock aversives, which BRI/JRC staff have used on his nephew since 1989 (initially via the Self-Injurious Behavior Inhibiting System and later the GED). On multiple occasions while in office, Sánchez brought out his nephew in front of colleagues and news media to demonstrate how difficult he was to physically restrain.
- Richard "Dick" Malott — Malott is a former president and co-founder of ABAI. He worked as a professor at Western Michigan University's department of psychology from 1966 to 2019 and co-founded its behavior analysis program. He continued to work at the university in an advisory role following his formal retirement and co-founded the Kalamazoo Academy for Behavioral and Academic Success (an ABA-based school) with fellow board member Margaret Uwayo in 2023. In 2018, Malott used what ABAI leadership described as "gender-based and race-based derogatory language" in a speech he gave to the California Association for Behavior Analysis; to mollify critics of his speech, he declined an award he was scheduled to receive at ABAI's annual convention the same year.
- Ronald "Ron" van Houten — Van Houten is a professor of psychology at Western Michigan University and an ABAI fellow. He previously worked as an associate editor for the Journal of Applied Behavior Analysis.
- Thomas Brady — Brady is a senior vice president at the Massachusetts-based bank Rockland Trust.
- W. Joseph Wyatt — Wyatt is a forensic psychologist, author, and legal consultant, who formerly worked as a professor for Marshall University.
- Margaret "Margo" Uwayo — Uwayo is a board certified behavior analyst who supervised Western Michigan University's Academic Lab Literacy Reading Program. She co-founded the Kalamazoo Academy for Behavioral and Academic Success (an ABA-based school) with fellow board member Richard Malott in 2023.
- Michael Sciannamea — Sciannamea's brother was housed at the BRI/JRC from 1978 until his death in 2023. In 2016, Sciannamea was among several family members of JRC residents who wrote to the FDA opposing a ban on the GED. In his letter, he claimed electric-shock aversives had benefited his brother and accused the GED's critics of mischaracterizing it as a torture device.
- Jennifer D. Kirby — Kirby is a psychology professor at Marshall University. She is also licensed to practice psychology within the state of West Virginia. She earned her Doctor of Philosophy in clinical child psychology at West Virginia University.

=== Finances ===
As of 2021, it cost the center $275,000 per year to keep a resident, which was largely paid for by state and local governments. As of the JRC's fiscal year ending June 30, 2025, the organization had an annual revenue of approximately $133.1 million. The center advertises a near-zero rejection rate, and has said that it is a good fit for any teen who is failing school, refusing to attend, or in a psychiatric or correctional setting. The center has sent out promotional materials to various institutions, and has had some success in picking up inmates from New York's juvenile jails and from Rikers Island. Some residents are sent to there by the foster care system. As of 2014, nearly 90% of the center's residents were from New York City, and about 90% of the residents were racial minorities.

The JRC is incorporated as a tax-exempt nonprofit organization. In 2020, it received $1.7 million in COVID-19 relief funds.

As the BRI of California's psychological consultant, Matthew Israel was paid $12,000 by the state of California. In 2007, Israel was paid $321,000.

The JRC raised $12,981 through the PayPal Giving Fund during calendar year 2023 and received a $25,000 grant from the Fidelity Investments Charitable Gift Fund during the fiscal year ending June 30, 2023. Fidelity awarded the JRC a $27,500 grant during the fiscal year ending June 30, 2024.

=== Advertising and promotion ===
In 2008, the JRC spent over $390,000 on advertising and promotion. The JRC advertises at psychiatric and juvenile justice conferences, where it attempts to get professionals to recommend the institution to parents and guardians. It also places ads on New York City radio stations. If a parent or guardian expresses interest in the center, a JRC recruiter will contact them to provide gifts and promotional materials. They will also help the parents sue their school district into paying the JRC's tuition and housing fees.

=== Company culture ===
All employees must sign an agreement not to talk publicly about the JRC, even after they no longer work there. Employees are encouraged to file anonymous reports against each other, and are forbidden from making casual conversation. The negative write-ups that result from these anonymous reports are called "performance improvement opportunities". Sometimes management will direct an employee to bait another into breaking the rules as a test. For example, an employee might try to start a casual conversation with another employee at the direction of management. The conversation will then be recorded so that staff caught breaking the rules may be disciplined.

Residents are also restricted from socializing with each other.

It was basically like we had to have enemies. They didn't want us to be friendly with nobody.

— Isabel Cedeño, former student

=== Legal ===
In 1986, the institute filed a lawsuit for $15 million ($44 million in 2025) against the director of the Massachusetts Office of Children, alleging that her attempt to shut the center down was a violation of the residents' rights.

Several critics of the JRC have claimed that the center harassed them, and that it sued them for defamation or threatened to sue them if they did not revoke their statements. In April 2022, a law firm representing the JRC sent a cease-and-desist letter to autistic-led nonprofit NeuroClastic, alleging that several statements the organization made about the JRC and its electric-shock aversives in an August 2021 article were false and defamatory. NeuroClastic refused to change the substance of the article, only revising one quote the following month at the request of the source. In a formal response to the cease-and-desist letter, attorneys for the Foundation for Individual Rights and Expression, which agreed to represent NeuroClastic, stated that the JRC was "censor[ing] its critics through baseless legal threats and bullying."

According to Disability Rights International, former residents, teachers, state officials, and legal advocates have expressed fear about publicly criticizing the JRC, and the JRC has filed numerous other lawsuits.

In 2007, the JRC spent $2.8 million in legal fees.

==== Enrollment ====
Some parents have filed, and won, lawsuits against their local school districts to keep their children enrolled at JRC. Under the Individuals with Disabilities Education Act, the federal government requires that all states must provide a "free and appropriate" education to all students. Any school district that cannot provide an appropriate education to a student is required to send that student to an approved school that can. The JRC helps families sue their school districts in order to send their children to the center. It also frequently sues school districts and states to keep individuals at the JRC after they turn 21.

=== Overbilling ===
In 2006, it was found that 14 of the center's 17 psychologists, including the director of psychology, lacked proper licenses. As the state reimburses the JRC for services rendered by doctors, the JRC had overbilled the state by nearly $800,000. As of 2008, the state had not collected the money. For misrepresenting the licensing status of the psychologists, the Board of Registration of Psychologists fined the JRC $43,000, and Matthew Israel $29,600.

=== Lobbying ===
The center regularly lobbies the government to prevent the passage of legislation that could threaten it. In 2010, it spent over $100,000 to lobby against the passage of a bill that would have made the use of electric shocks illegal. The center has also lobbied against bills that would have banned the use of restraints and other aversives in Massachusetts schools. As of 2011, the JRC had spent over $1 million on lobbying efforts.

== See also ==
- Association for Behavior Analysis International
- Unethical human experimentation in the United States
- World Wide Association of Specialty Programs and Schools

=== Abuse ===
- Disability abuse
- Institutional abuse

=== Torture ===
- Medical torture
- Pain compliance
- Torture in the United States

=== Other human rights movements ===
- Antipsychiatry
- Children's rights movement
- Human rights movement
- Psychiatric survivors movement
