= Shain Neumeier =

American lawyer (born 1987)

- Born: 1987 (age 38–39)
- Education: Bachelor of arts, Smith College, 2009 Juris doctor, Suffolk University Law School, 2012
- Occupations: Attorney, activist
- Known for: Disability, youth, and transgender rights activism
- Parents: Ed Neumeier (father); Laura Mahaffey (mother)
- Awards: Leadership in Advocacy Award, Association of University Centers on Disabilities; Outstanding Young Lawyer of the Year Award, Massachusetts Bar Association
- Honors: Phi Delta Phi

Shain A. Mahaffey Neumeier (born 1987) is an American autistic and nonbinary transgender attorney. Neumeier advocates against coercive and forced treatment, including advocacy to close the Judge Rotenberg Center, an institution for people with developmental disabilities. They are also an activist for autism rights, disability rights, and other associated causes.

== Personal life ==
Neumeier has multiple disabilities including post-traumatic stress disorder, cleft lip and palate and ectodermal dysplasia. Neumeier's father Edward is a screenwriter best known for the science fiction films RoboCop and Starship Troopers.

== Education and career ==
Neumeier studied at Smith College and Suffolk University Law School and later worked on youth rights policy issues for CAFETY. As an attorney, they are in solo practice in Massachusetts. Their law practice represents people facing petitions for involuntary commitment.

== Activism and writing ==
Neumeier advocates against coercive and forced treatment, and has called for the closure of the Judge Rotenberg Center (JRC), an institution which uses electric skin shock aversion therapy on people with developmental disabilities. Neumeier also testified before the United Nations special rapporteur on torture about the JRC.

Marquis Who's Who featured Neumeier in their 2021 October Maker's List.

Neumeier's essay Back into the Fires that Forged Us appeared in the 2018 book Resistance and Hope: Essays by Disabled People (ISBN 9780463255704). Their essay addressed how disability activism has been criminalized in the United States.

=== Selected publications ===
- Shain A M Neumeier & Ly Xīnzhèn M. Zhǎngsūn Brown, Beyond Diversity and Inclusion: Understanding and Addressing Ableism, Heterosexism, and Transmisia in the Legal Profession: Comment on Blanck, Hyseni, and Altunkol Wise's National Study of the Legal Profession, doi:10.1017/amj.2021.3
