= The Art Genome Project =

Classification system for art and design and technological framework for search on Artsy

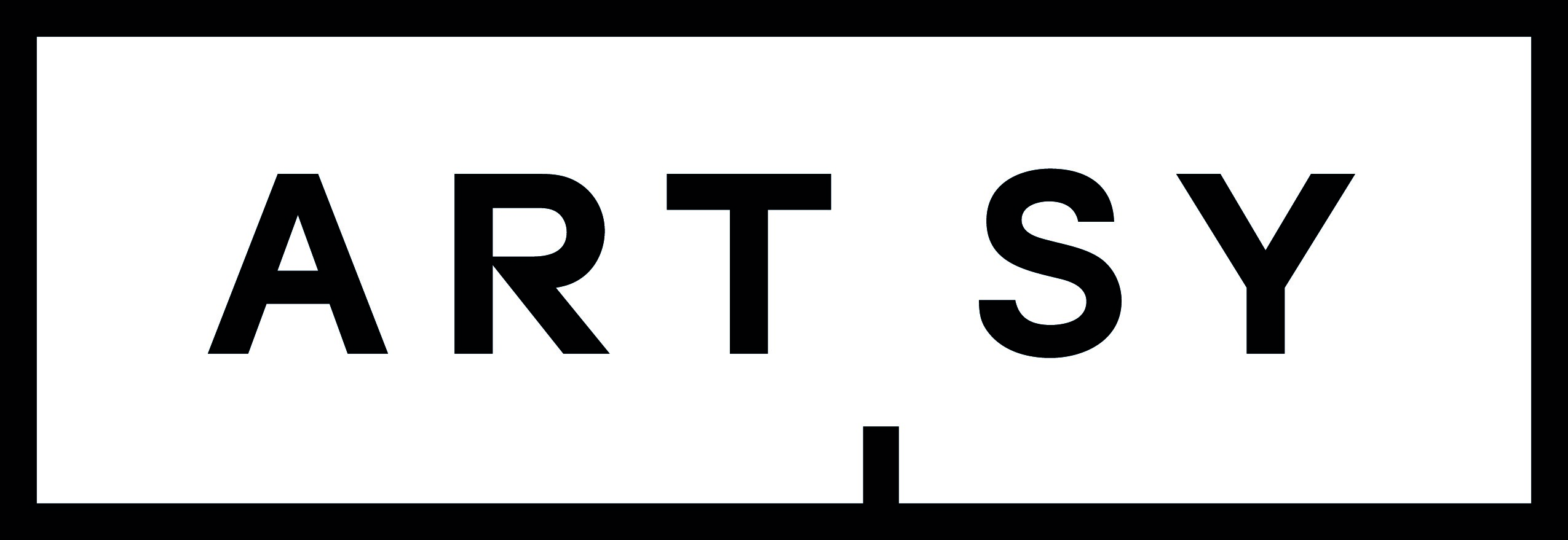
- Key people: Carter Cleveland; Sebastian Cwilich; Matthew Israel; Joe Kennedy; Madeleine Boucher; Rachel Egan
- Website: artsy.net/theartgenomeproject

The Art Genome Project is the search technology behind Artsy.

The Art Genome Project's search technology is the product of an ongoing art-historical study — undertaken by a team of contributors with art-historical backgrounds at Artsy — seeking to define the characteristics which distinguish and connect works of art, architecture, ancient artifacts and design.

Its primary aim is to provide Artsy users dynamic search categories and explain similarities among art and artists. Currently, there are over 1000 "genes" (i.e., attributes of art) in the project's taxonomy, including art-historical movements, subject matter, and formal qualities. These genes are the product of Artsy's team and their engagement with (and feedback from) the museums, galleries, curators, critics and art historians present on Artsy's platform.

There are two general parts of the project:

1) Conceiving and defining such characteristics, referred to as "genes";

2) Applying these genes to artists and artworks — creating "genomes" for both — for the artsy.net site.

Importantly, unlike tags, which are binary, genes are applied with values ranging from 0 to 100. The value indicates the degree of relevance of a gene to an artist or work of art. While not seen by users, such gene values account for the strength of a relationship between artists and artworks. It also enables similarity to be expressed in a more nuanced way than it might be with just tags because one can weigh various attributes of an artist or work of art to establish which might be the most or less important. Furthermore, such nuance allows for matching potential collectors with artworks based on their tastes and preferences.

Artsy's "genes" create various opportunities for discovering and learning about the artist and artworks. If users search for an artist, they can see "related" artists and if they search for an artwork, they can see "related" artworks. Genes (with definitions) also appear on their own pages and provide the backbone for Artsy's browse page.

The Art Genome Project provides metadata for search (and similarity) results based on the principles of information retrieval (TF/IDF) and presents results in a UX-driven search product.

Matthew Israel, an art historian, is the Director of The Art Genome Project.

== Precedents for The Art Genome Project ==
The Art Genome Project has often been compared to Pandora's Music Genome Project, and was originally developed in consultation with Pandora's Joe Kennedy. Both aim to create comprehensive (though by no means exhaustive) analyses of types of art by identifying a set of criteria, which both call "genes". These are both broadly applicable to their respective art forms, as well as useful for generating interesting connections for users. Importantly, while The Art Genome is currently one extensive list of genes for all works of art, Pandora has separate genomes (lists of genes) for each genre of music.

The Music Genome Project and TAGP are examples of Big Data, which is a sector of algorithmic technology that synthesizes data to predict what users will prefer. Artsy's genome is user facing, allowing users to navigate genes manually. Netflix also makes customized recommendations to users based on the qualities of the movies that they enjoy. Amazon Art makes suggestions to users based on their browsing and purchasing history.

Museums and galleries as well as other online art image databases, such as Google Art Project and Artstor, digitize artworks for public access, but beyond providing basic metadata (artist, title, date, medium) these databases do not extensively classify works of art or create connections between them.

== The Art Genome Project and Other Taxonomies for Artwork ==
Art historians, libraries and image archives have long used classification systems, art cataloging standards or metadata, and created taxonomies, such as The Getty Art & Architecture Thesaurus to systematize the description of artworks. Classification is one of the major foundations of the discipline of art history.

Most college and university art history surveys are based on such an idea of classification, to provide students with a way of grasping the history of art and a jumping-off point for more focused research. Unlike other types of classification, The Art Genome's taxonomy was designed for the purposes of establishing similarities between artists and artworks.

=== Genes versus Tags ===
In the words of Matthew Israel, Director of The Art Genome Project, "Genes are not tags — though we have many tags on the site — because tags are binary (an item is either tagged as "dog" or it is not). Genes, in contrast, can range from 0-100, thus capturing how strongly a gene applies to a specific artist or artwork. This level of nuance in connecting works of art is impossible with a simple tagging mechanism."

Importantly, The Art Genome Project does incorporate over 6000 tags for content (iconography) in artwork as well as certain materials and mediums, which do not need the nuance of genes.

== Reception ==
=== Positive Reception ===
Digitalmeetsculture.net calls TAGP "user-friendly," "intelligent and orchestrated behind the scenes by the Artsy experts." Complex.com highlighted genes in their article "15 Awesome Genes on Artsy" to show "just how incredible their project is."

In the New York Times, the Cooper-Hewitt Museum's director of new and emerging media Seb Chan said, "Sites like Art.sy were not meant to replace museums, galleries or books, but rather to help the public, especially art neophytes, stretch the boundaries of their taste. ‘You shouldn’t need to be a scholar to discover works of art that you might be fascinated by,’ he said. ‘You go to museums, and you browse — chancing upon things is what it’s all about. The Art Genome is another way of creating serendipitous connections.’"

Jonathan Olivares praised The Art Genome’s comprehensiveness, objectivity and ability to accommodate future revisions: "Unlike books, which can only be modified between editions, the website is made of millions of layers of edits that can be reworked at any time… [and] unlike the opinionated and subjectively ordered history book, this neutral and re-configurable database will allow us to access any work of art or design, within any imaginable order, and instantly."

=== Criticism ===
Criticism around The Art Genome Project centers on "its classification system, which rubs up some artists the wrong way."

Some critics have questioned the accuracy of the connections made through genes: "'I don't think what I am doing has anything to do with Cindy Sherman,' says British artist Jonathan Smith after being told the site links his work to hers via a staged-photography gene. 'That sounds like something a programmer would think of." Others have highlighted the subjective nature of genes and expressed a concern that they might be applied reductively.
