= Self-Injurious Behavior Inhibiting System =

Aversive conditioning device

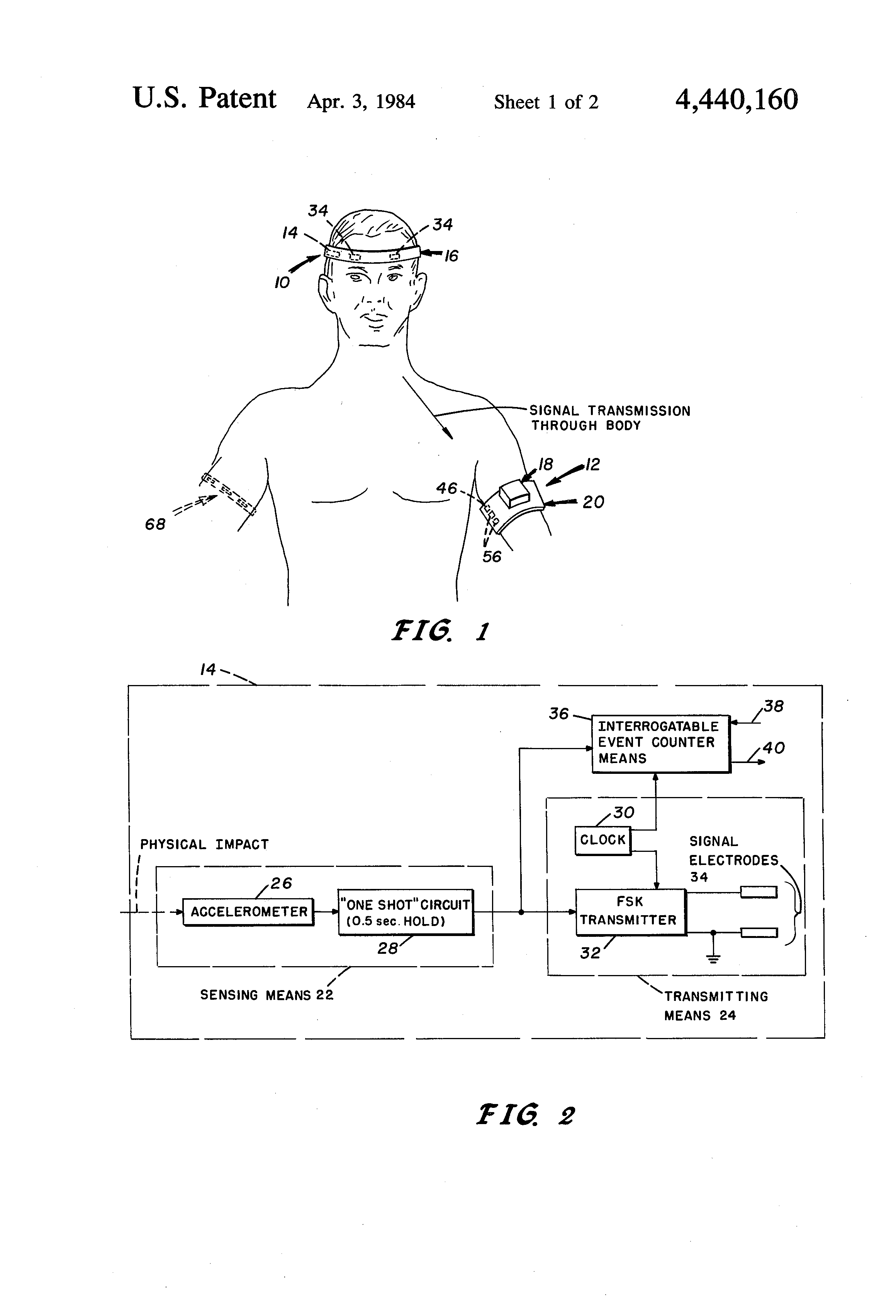
A patent drawing of the SIBIS

The Self-Injurious Behavior Inhibiting System (SIBIS) is an apparatus designed to reduce self-injurious behavior (SIB) directed at the head, such as banging the head against walls and other objects or hitting oneself in the head. Invented by Dr. Robert E. Fischell, Glen H. Fountain, and Charles M. Blackburn in 1984, the device is able to detect instances of head-directed SIB, and delivers an aversive electric shock contingent on its occurrence. The United States Food and Drug Administration banned the device in 2020 as part of a larger blanket ban on devices that use electric shocks to modify behavior without the consent of the user. Other devices covered by this ban include the Graduated Electronic Decelerator.

== Effectiveness and safety ==
The United States Food and Drug Administration (FDA) has concluded that aversive conditioning devices like the SIBIS pose an "unreasonable risk of harm" and are less effective than positive behavior support alone. While some studies appear to support their efficacy, these studies do not meet modern standards of evidence. Newer and better designed studies find more risks and fewer benefits. The FDA states that such devices may cause both physical and psychological harm, including: depression, anxiety, worsening of self-injurious behavior, PTSD, burns, and pain.

== Design ==
There are two models of SIBIS. The simpler model consists of an electrode and a radio transmitter wrapped around the arm or leg using Velcro. When a child administers a blow to the head, the SIBIS device is used to recognize the self-injurious behavior. This is possible because the SIBIS device is composed of two wirelessly connected parts: the "sensor module" and the "stimulus module". The impact monitor serves to both detect an impact to the head and to protect the head from the damage that the impact could potentially incur. The sensor module is placed on either the body part receiving the impact (such as the head) or on the body part delivering the impact (such as the arm or knee). Wherever it is placed, the sensor module senses the impact of the blow and sends out an electrical signal. This electrical signal triggers the stimulus module, allowing for the aversive stimulation, the shock, to be delivered.

=== Specifications ===
SIBIS is designed to reduce SIB by immediately delivering positive punishment when head-directed SIB occurs. Only 5 cm × 3 cm × 1 cm in size, the stimulus module delivers an 85 V electrical shock at 3.5 mA of current to the subject each time the patient strikes his or her head sufficiently hard enough to register on the velocity impact detector. The delivered shock is designed not to be very painful, but rather an uncomfortable response to the SIB. The impact detector of the apparatus can be adjusted.

== Judge Rotenberg Center ==
The SIBIS was used at the Judge Rotenberg Center between 1988 and 1990 as part of the school's behavior modification program. Behaviorists at the center used the SIBIS not only for the purpose of reducing self-harming behavior, but to deter any behavior that they considered undesirable. The school's behaviorists were not satisfied with the SIBIS because its shock was not powerful enough to produce compliance some cases: The school's founder, Matthew Israel, reported that one student was shocked by the SIBIS over 5000 times in a day without the desired change in behavior. Israel asked the manufacturer of the SIBIS, Human Technologies, to build a device that delivered stronger shocks, but they refused. Israel then designed the Graduated Electronic Decelerator (GED), which delivered much more powerful shocks than the SIBIS that lasted ten times as long. The SIBIS was soon phased out at the Judge Rotenberg Center in favor of the GED.

== See also ==
- Aversives as part of Applied Behavior Analysis (ABA)
- Operant conditioning
- Judge Rotenberg Educational Center

Behaviorists

- B.F. Skinner
- Ivar Lovaas
- Matthew Israel
