= List of instruments used in forensics =

Instruments used in Forensics, including autopsy dissections are as follows:

== Instrument list ==
| Instrument | Uses |
|---|---|
| Autopsy table | Corpses undergoing autopsy are placed here. |
| CO_{2} | for preservation of the corpse |
| Dissection scissors | Dissection scissors are used in autopsy to cut open body tissues. |
| Arterial & jugular tubes | to draw or drain out all the blood before replacing it with embalming fluids like formaldehyde for preservation of structures as practiced in Anatomy |
| Head rest | To elevate the head |
| Restraint | to hold the corpse in place so that it does not change position during dissection |
| Rubber gloves | Disposable gloves are used to prevent contamination of evidence and to keep the wearer safe. |
| Goggles | Goggles are worn to protect foreign objects from getting in the eyes. |
| Jackets, aprons, etc. | to protect against infection |
| Autopsy saws | to cut tough structures like bones |
| Blades | Blades are used during autopsy to cut bodily tissues. |
| Towel clamps | to hold towels in place |
| Skull breaker or often a (hammer and chisel) | To break the skull. |
| Bone saw | A bone saw is used for cutting bones. |
| Sternal saw | for cutting into the chest of the body by cutting the sternum |
| Toothed forceps | for tearing or holding structures |
| Mallet | used as a hammer |
| Autopsy hammer | used just as a hammer |
| Skull key | a T-shaped chisel used as a lever while removing skull cap |
| Brain knife | to cleanly cut the brain |
| Rib shears | to cut through the ribs while opening the chest |
| Dissecting scissors | for sharp cutting |
| Speculum | for vaginal and rectal examinations |
| Non-absorbable sutures | usually nylon to close the body cavities and sutures it |
| Postmortem needles | large thick needles for suturing the skin after an autopsy to return the body to a natural looking state to prepare it for burial |
| Medical syringes | for fluid aspiration |
| Foley catheter | for evacuation or irrigation of the bladder to collect a urine sample |
| Nasogastric tube | for nasogastric aspiration of stomach contents; usually it is not used |
| Water bath | for flotation tests to detect presence of gas, specially for infants (lungs, intestine) as a sign of postpartum life |
| Specimen jars/envelopes/packets | preservation of material evidence |
| Swabs | collecting smears |
| Metacarpal saw | video: External link; a bone saw |
| Double-ended probe | used for probing |
| Tongue tie | to tie away the tongue so that it doesn't fall back into the pharynx |
| Formaldehyde | primary preservative for Anatomy; video link |
| saturated Common salt solution / Rectified spirit | primary preservative for Autopsy; video link |
| Osteometric board | to measure the length of (usually dried) bones |
| X-ray boxes | to view X-ray images |
| Microscopes | Used to examine evidence |
| Fingerprint set | to collect fingerprints; video link |

Serological, chemical and genetic testings are done by the respective people of these branches.

== Image gallery ==
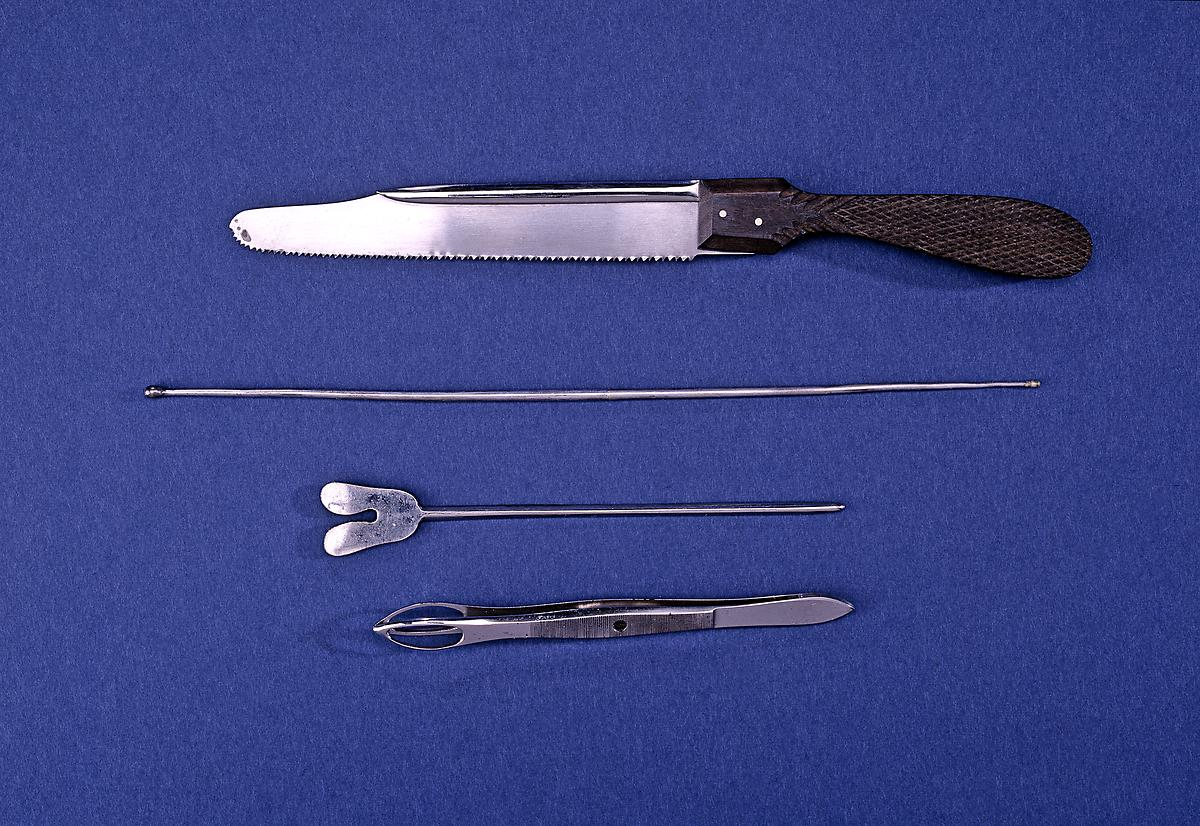
Autopsy instruments

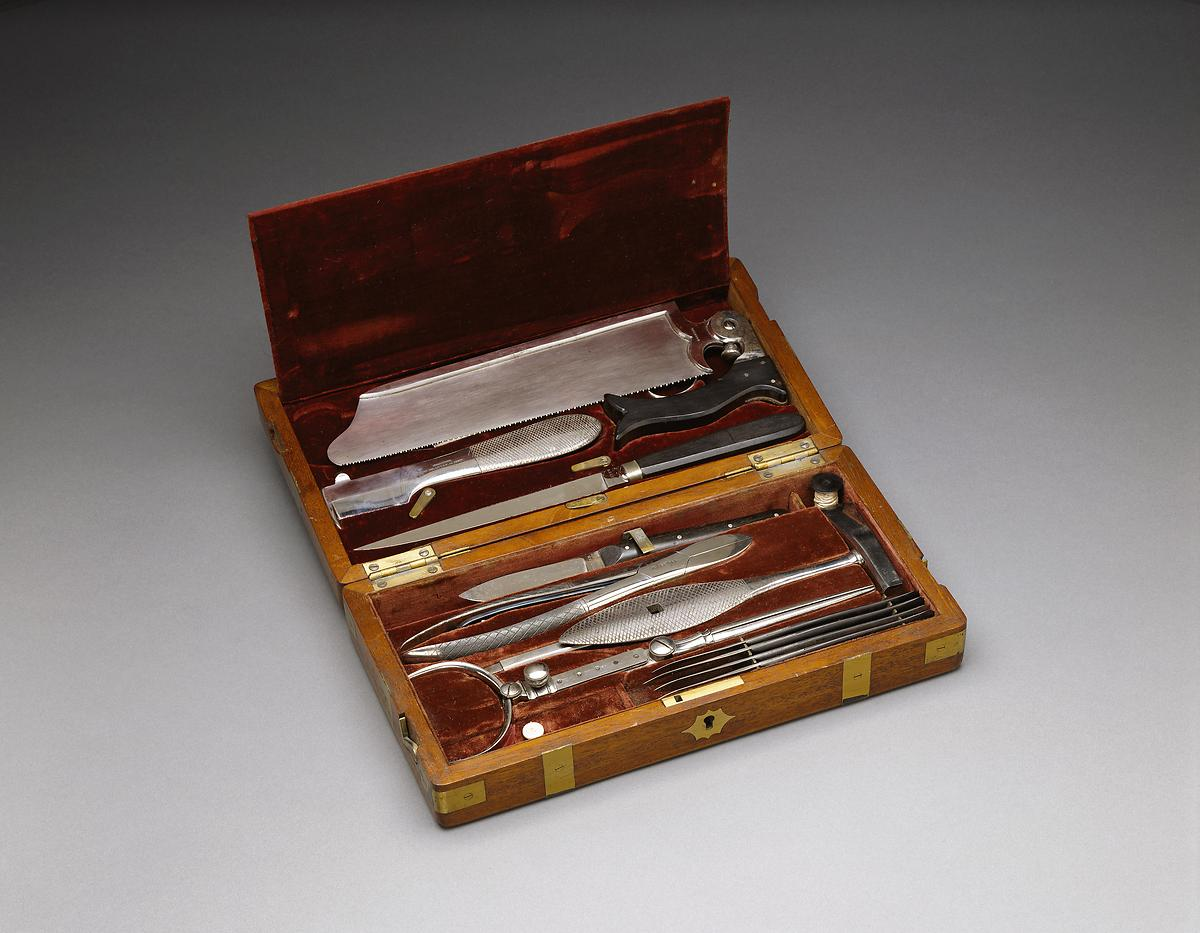
Autopsy instruments (old set)

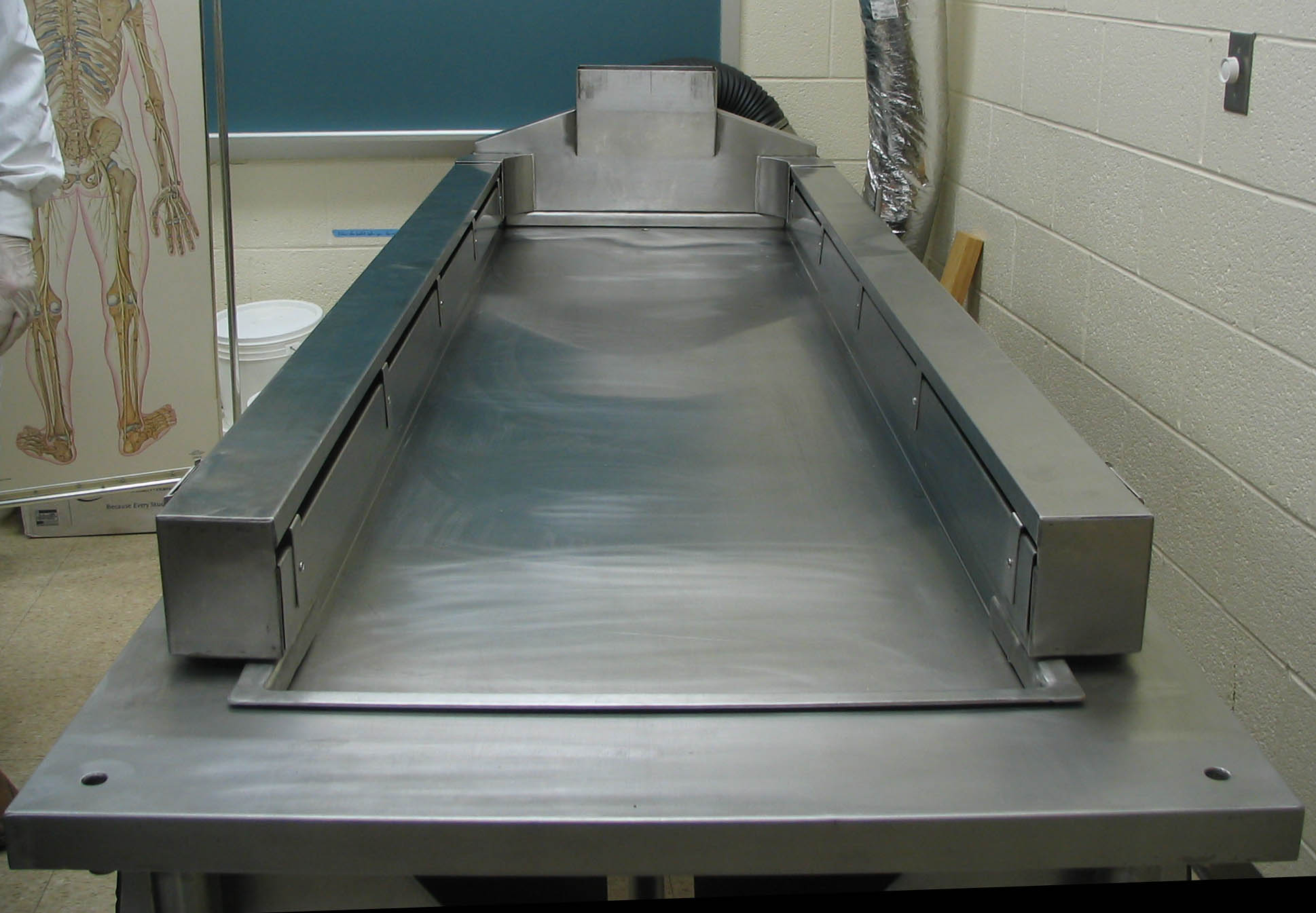
dissection table
