= Malott =

Malott is a surname. Notable people with the surname include:

- Ally Malott (born 1992), American basketball player
- Deane Waldo Malott (1898–1996), American academic and administrator
- Jeff Malott (born 1996), Canadian ice hockey player
- Mike Malott (born 1991), Canadian mixed martial artist
- Richard Malott (born 1936), American professor
- Wes Malott (born 1976), American ten-pin bowler
