= Posey vest =

Device used to restrain a person to a bed or chair

A Posey vest is a type of medical restraint used to restrain a patient to a bed or chair. Its name comes from the J.T. Posey Company, its inventor, though the term "Posey" is used generically to describe all such devices. The vest is placed on the patient, and meshy straps extending from each corner are tied either individually to each side of the bed or together to the back of a chair. Poseys are most often used to prevent patients from injuring themselves by falling or climbing out of the bed or chair. They allow patients the freedom to move around their arms and legs if no limb restraints have been applied.

Laws in many places require Posey vests be applied with the opening at the patient's front. Misuse in which a Posey vest is applied backwards has resulted in patients being choked to death. Many lawsuits have been litigated in which a patient has died while restrained by a Posey.

== Variations ==
A cushion belt is a belt that does not include a vest, and simply fastens around the waist, and is tied to the sides of a bed or to a chair.

An alternate version of the Posey is a vest that is placed on with an opening in the back and a back zipper, and straps that extend from the sides.

== See also ==
- Straitjacket
