= Stun belt =

Wearable electric shock device

A stun belt is a belt fastened around the subject's waist, leg, or arm that carries a battery and control pack, and contains features to stop the subject from unfastening or removing it. A remote-control signal is sent to tell the control pack to give the subject an electric shock. Some models are activated by the subject's movement.

The electrical pulse delivered by the control pack is based on the waveform developed by Jack Cover, which he called the TASER.

These devices are used to control prisoners in the United States and elsewhere in the world. Some stun belts can restrain the subject's hands and have a strap going under the groin to stop them from rotating the belt around their waist to reach its battery and control pack and trying to deactivate it. Stun belts are not generally available to the public.

In 1996, Amnesty International called on the United States to ban the use and export of the machine, arguing that it is a torture device that is "in direct contravention of international standards on the treatment of prisoners". Since then, the United States has not complied with the organization's request. Presently, the U.S. and South Africa are the only two countries that still use the stun belt.

== See also ==
- Graduated Electronic Decelerator
- Taser
