= Allynwood Academy =

Defunct therapeutic boarding school in Hancock, New York, United States

Coordinates: 41°54′43″N 75°12′4″W

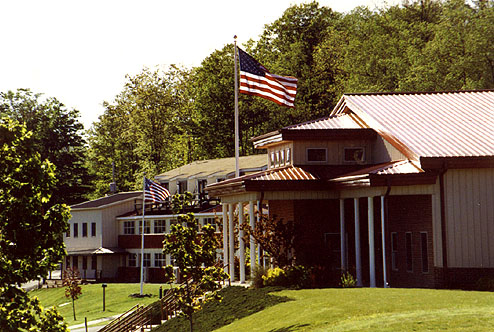
- Hancock, New York; United States

Information
- Former name: Family Foundation School
- Type: Private High School
- Motto: Building Character. Changing Lives.
- Religious affiliation: Interfaith
- Established: 1984
- Closed: August 8, 2014
- Enrollment: closed
- Student to teacher ratio: 4:1
- Campus: 158 acres (0.64 km^{2})
- Colors: Blue and Gold
- Athletics: n/a
- Mascot: Falcon
- Website: allynwood.org

Allynwood Academy, formerly the Family Foundation School, was a private, co-educational, college preparatory, therapeutic boarding school located in Hancock, New York. The school was in operation from 1984 through 2014, when it closed due to declining enrollment amid a raft of physical, emotional, and sexual abuse allegations made by alumni in a grassroots "truth campaign." At least ten lawsuits have been brought by former students since 2019, in which plaintiffs claimed that strip searches, hard labor, isolation rooms, physical restraint, and sexual assault were rampant at the school in the 1990s and 2000s. Three of the lawsuits were settled in October 2021 for undisclosed sums. A front-page New York Times article in 2018 reported a pattern of at least one hundred deaths by overdose and suicide among alumni, the vast majority before age 40.

== History ==
The school was founded in the 1980s by Tony and Betty Argiros, who were recovering alcoholics following a twelve-step program. As a part of the own final step in their own program, they took young people who were recovering from substance abuse into their home. They became foster parents to many of these adolescents and provided some with homeschooling education. After the number of foster children began to exceed the allowable limit for New York State, they sought and obtained legal status for their home as a licensed school.

Over time, the school grew beyond the Argiros home into a campus that includes a main school building, boys' and girls' dormitories, a chapel, food service, laundry services, art and athletic facilities.

By 2000, the Argiros' children had assumed control over the day-to-day operations of the school. In October 2013, the Family Foundation School changed its name to "Allynwood Academy", which the school stated was due to a change in program structure. Then, citing a decline in enrollment, the school closed 2014.

== Program ==
The Family Foundation School program was based upon three core goals: maximize academic potential; develop spiritually and emotionally through a 12-step program of recovery; grow and mature psychologically through the 12-Step program as well as group and individual therapies. Students at the school were divided into "families" of roughly 30 students and 6 staff members. The family groups ate together, during which time "Table Topics" served as an opportunity for the group to address any negative issues presented by individual students.

The school operated year-round, with two 25-week school terms, and employed a residential behavior modification program that was chiefly based on the twelve-step approach.

The school served high-school age (grades 9–12) children that had problems with various addictions (e.g. drugs, alcohol, food, sex, gambling or gaming) or other psychological challenges. Students were typically recommended for placement at the school by a social worker, school guidance counselor, or psychologist.

The Bridge was a program added circa 2012–2013 for participants ages 18 to 20.

== Accreditation and affiliations ==
The Family Foundation School was accredited as a school by the Middle States Association of Colleges and Secondary Schools, the New York State Department of Education, and was accredited as a behavioral health care facility by the Joint Commission, a private not-for profit quality assurance organization.

The school was a charter member of National Association of Therapeutic Schools and Programs (NATSAP).

== Extracurricular programs ==
The Family Foundation School's extracurricular programs included sports teams, drama productions, musical programs, an art department and a wide variety of clubs. Students also participated with members of the local community through religious associations, scouting, Rotary Club, Job Corps, the Sullivan County BOCES, and various other community service projects in the Hancock, NY area.

The school's performing arts program presented full-scale musicals, drama productions, winter and spring choral concerts that were open to the public, and was a regular participant in the North American Music Festivals.

In 2004 and 2005, the school's debate team won the seventh annual Delaware-Otsego Bar Associations Forensic Speech Tournament, a regional debating competition.

The school soccer team won the championship in the New York State Class D, Section IX Conference in 2005.

In 2009, the school's Math Team earned an honorable mention in the 2009 Moody's Mega Math Challenge, for their presentation examining the effect of President Barack Obama's economic stimulus program on employment in the United States.

== Faculty ==
The Family Foundation School employed over three-dozen educational professionals, counsellors and support staff, and maintained a 4:1 student-teacher ratio. About half of the school's faculty and staff members have been through a twelve-step recovery process.

The school's English and Philosophy instructor and middle school principal, Jan Cheripko, is the author of nine books, has won numerous national and international book awards and has been a featured speaker at the National Council of Teachers of English, the International Reading Association, and numerous other New York State and Northeastern U.S. regional education conferences. He has also conducted graduate teaching accredited workshops on how to reach at-risk students through writing and literature.

== Alumni ==
Family Foundation School alumnus Wells Thompson is a midfielder for the Colorado Rapids, a Major League Soccer team in the United States. He began his professional soccer career with the New England Revolution, where he played from 2007 through 2009.

A Family Foundation School Alumni Association was established after the school held its first alumni reunion in September 2006. More than 125 former students from around the United States attended the reunion.

== Controversy ==
=== Congressional hearings ===
The Family Foundation School was one of several residential programs for special-needs adolescents that were discussed in United States Congress Committee on Education and Labor hearings in 2007 and 2008, regarding a policy of using students to discipline other students, including chasing, capturing, and restraining runaways from the facility.

The school responded by declaring its support for the efforts of the committee to keep children safe from harm, adding that the school had since modified its crisis-management methods to meet the standards of both the New York State Department of Education and the Therapeutic Crisis Intervention (TCI) program developed by Cornell University. The school also stated that since 1999, all school faculty and staff are required to be trained in TCI techniques. Following the April 24 hearing, several parents of former students, a former student, and a former staff member wrote to the committee in response to the negative testimony, providing positive reports of their own experiences with the Family Foundation School.

=== Activist response ===
Beginning in 2007, Community Alliance for the Ethical Treatment of Youth (CAFETY) conducted a campaign against the Family Foundation School. In October 2009, a local newspaper reported that CAFETY had sent a letter to residents of Delaware County, claiming abusive conditions at the school, including excerpts from former student testimonials. The letter directed residents to an anti-school website for more information about the alleged abusive conditions. Delaware County law enforcement, social services officials, and the school stated that the allegations in letter were based on past issues that had been corrected by the school. CAFETY disputes this claim, saying that its concerns about alleged abuse are based on written complaints by students who attended the school as recently as 2008. CAFETY members have also taken part in rallies in other areas of the country, where experiences at the school were addressed. Former students have stated that they were restrained with blankets and duct tape for hours at a time, and that some students were forced to eat everything on their plate, and would not be fed subsequent meals until they did so.

=== State inspections ===
Allegations of abuse prompted an unannounced inspection of the school in 2010 by several New York state agencies. The inspectors reported that they had not found any "current instances of abuse or neglect," but they continued to have concern about reports provided by former students, several of whom gave accounts of "strikingly similar and troubling experiences".

== Closing ==
On July 31, 2014, citing financial challenges from declining enrollment, the school announced that it would be closing its doors eight days later. An outpouring of support however, prompted the school to remain open for 15 students and minimal staff through the end of 2014, while the remaining 70 employees and students were either laid off or asked to leave, respectively. In addition to financial challenges, it has been suggested lingering accusations of abuse by school staff members played a role in the school's declining enrollment and eventual closure.

== See also ==
- Drug rehabilitation
- Joint Commission
- Residential treatment center
