= Tobinworld =

Defunct school for the developmentally disabled

Location
- 920 E Broadway, Glendale, CA 91205; United States of America; 34°8′46″N 118°14′36″W

Information
- Former name: Behavior Research Institute of California
- Type: Private School
- Established: October 1977
- Closed: 2019
- School district: Glendale Unified School District
- Principal: Judy Weber-Israel; Charles Conrad
- Grades: All-Through
- Website: tobinworld.org

Tobinworld (founded in 1977 as the Behavior Research Institute of California) was a Californian school for children with autism and emotional disorders. The school consisted of three campuses: Tobinworld I, Tobinworld II, and Tobinworld III. It was founded by Judy Weber-Israel, the wife of Matthew Israel, as a sister school to the Judge Rotenberg Center, which has been condemned by the United Nations for torture of its students. The school shut down in 2019, however the associated Tobinworld Mental Health Clinic remains open as of 2026. Tobinworld used the methods of applied behavior analysis and discrete trial training to modify behavior in students. In 1991, an employee of Tobinworld pleaded no contest on charges of child abuse against a nine-year old boy who was a student at the school. The child stopped breathing, and was admitted to the hospital in critical condition with possible brain damage.

In 2016, police arrested a teacher's aid who was caught on video slapping a nine-year old boy while two other staff held him in the air by the arms and legs. The video was recorded by an employee of the school, who posted it to Snapchat. A friend of the employee then reported it to the police, saying “This is the third time this kind of thing has been recorded by him. It was so unbearable to watch, I had to do something about it.” The event prompted the American Civil Liberties Union, Disability Rights California, and the Disability Rights Education and Defense Fund to issue a demand that the California Department of Education take action against the improper use of force on students with disabilities in Californian schools.

In 2014, the mother of a seven-year old student filed a complaint against the school, alleging that the school had a "culture of abuse". The lawsuit further alleged that the school's vice principal and four other staff members had restrained her son and then kicked his feet out from under him. When he fell, bloodying his nose, staff wrapped a plastic bag around his face, causing him to choke on his own blood. The lawsuit prompted an investigation of the school, in which it was discovered that Matthew Israel was working there without proper credentials. The state declared that the school had failed to properly vet and screen employees, and suspended the credentials of Tobinworld I and Tobinworld II, as well as the intake of new students. Tobinworld II closed down in 2016 after local school districts withdrew funding and removed their students from the school, citing concerns about Matthew Israel and the physical abuse of students. Judy Weber-Israel claimed the school had been the victim of misleading claims by the media. Soon after the school was closed, the associated Tobinworld Mental Health Clinic was opened in Pasadena, California. As of 2026, it remains open.
