= Richard Malott =

Richard W. Malott is a professor emeritus of psychology at Western Michigan University and a member of the board of directors at the Judge Rotenberg Center. He is a former president of Association for Behavior Analysis International.

== Biography ==
Richard Malott was born October 3, 1936. He grew up in Converse, Indiana, and received his undergraduate degree from Indiana University in 1958, followed by a Ph.D. from Columbia University in 1963. He began his professional career as an Assistant Professor of Psychology at Denison University in 1963. He is currently a Professor Emeritus at Western.

== Professional work ==
Malott and his colleague Jack Michael provided services at the Croyden Avenue School, a center for autistic and cognitively impaired students in Kalamazoo County. Malott founded the Kalamazoo Autism Center in 2008.

Richard W. Malott is a member of the board of directors of the Judge Rotenberg Center. He is a former president of Association for Behavior Analysis International.

== Controversies ==
Malott has been involved in a leadership role at the Judge Rotenberg Educational Center since at least 2009. In 2012, a video showing a patient face down and screaming while receiving electric shocks for up to six hours was aired on Fox News. The institution has faced a United Nations Human Rights inquiry, a U.S. Department of Justice civil rights investigation, and allegations of torture. The U.N. Human Rights Council inquiry determined that patient rights had "...been violated under the UN Convention against Torture and other international standards" in 2013. During a California Association for Behavior Analysis conference in 2018, Malott gave a keynote address in which he used derogatory gender-based and race-based language. Following the conference, the ABAI released a statement condemning the address. A change.org petition calling for Malott to be censured was started shortly after, and amassed over 2,500 signatures.

== Works ==
- Moran, . J., & Malott, (2004) Evidence-based educational methods. Academic Press, 2004. According to WorldCat, the book is held in 1206 libraries.
- Malott, R. W. & Suarez-Trojan, (2004) Principles of behavior (fifth edition). : Prentice Hall.
- Malott, R. W., Malott, M. E., & Trojan, E. W. (2004). Principios elementales comportamiento (cuarta edicion). : Prentice Hall.
- Malott, R. W., Whaley, W., Malott, M., Sugiyama, N., & Shimamune, S. (1994) Elementary principles of behavior (Japanese edition). .
- Whaley, L. & Malott, R. W. (1981). Principios elementares do comportamento. Vol. 1 & 2 Translators: Maria Amelia Matos, Maria Lucia Ferrara, Cibele Freire Santoro, and Antonio Jayro Motta Fagundes. : EPU.
- Glenn, S. S., Grant, L. Whaley, L., & Malott, R. W. (1976) Introduction to the science of psychology. : Behaviordelia.
- General, L., Malott, R. W., and Whaley, W. (1976) Introduction to the concepts of psychology. : Behaviordelia.
- Malott, R. W., (1973) Humanistic behaviorism and social psychology. : Behaviordelia.
- Malott, R. W., General, A., & Snapper, V. B. (1973) Issues in the analysis of behavior. : Behaviordelia.
- Malott, R. W., (1972) Contingency management in education and other equally exciting places. : Behaviordelia.
- Malott, R. W., (1972) How I learned to relate to my laboratory rat through humanistic behaviorism: A laboratory manual. : Behaviordelia.
