= Pain compliance =

Use of painful stimulus to control or direct a person or animal

Pain compliance is the use of painful stimulus to control or direct a person. The purpose of pain compliance is to direct the actions of the subject, and to this end, the pain is lessened or removed when compliance is achieved. This provides incentive to the subject to carry out the action required. The stimulus can be manual through brute force and placing pressure on pain-sensitive areas on the body. Painful hyperextension or hyperflexion on joints is also used. Tools such as a whip or a baton (capable of inflicting blunt trauma), an electroshock weapon, or chemicals such as tear gas or pepper spray are commonly used as well.

== Use by law enforcement ==
A common use in humans is as a law enforcement technique to assist with taking a suspect into custody, control a suspect in custody or encourage action on behalf of a person who is passively resisting. In disciplined law enforcement, the use of pain compliance forms part of a use of force continuum which will usually start with verbal warnings, before escalating measures. Another common use of this technique is to physically compel chosen behavior, e.g. curbing school-yard bullying or racketeering, independent of any law enforcement process.

The pain stimulus can be manual, using a pain compliance hold or can be through the use of weapons such as an electroshock weapon (taser) or ballistic round. Pain compliance as part of an escalation of force policy normally presumes a rational adversary, but some altered states such as mental illness, phencyclidine and amphetamine use, or extreme adrenaline may alter the subject's perception of pain or willingness to submit. Like other forms of non-lethal force, such pain compliance strategies are not perfect and may be abused as a form of torture, with plausible deniability. For this reason the use of pain compliance is often subject to explicit rules of engagement designed to prevent abuse and avoid conflict escalation.

== See also ==
- Graduated electronic decelerator
- Judge Rotenberg Center
- Physical restraint
- Torture
