= Limb restraint =

Physical restraints

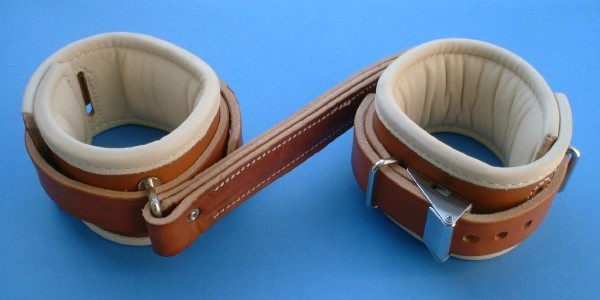
Leg restraints

Limb restraints can be physical (or psychological) restraints that inhibit an individual's movement in their arms or legs. The most common limb restraint is physical, whereby restraints are fixed to the individual in order to prevent movement of the limbs. They are most commonly used within the field of medicine. However, opposed to physical restraints, chemical restraints are forms of psychoactive medication that intentionally inhibit an individual's behaviour or movement.

== Types of limb restraints ==
As a medical restraint, limb restraints are soft, padded cuffs which are applied to a patient to prevent the patient from causing harm to themselves or to others. The device consists of cuffs which are wrapped around the patient's wrists or ankles, and straps that are attached to the frame of their bed or a restraint chair.

Limb restraints can be fabric, leather or metal. The most commonly used type of limb restraints are fabric restraints. If fabric restraints are inadequate to restrain a patient, leather or metal restraints can be used. In most places, legal restrictions apply to the use of restraints in clinical settings.

The application of limb restraints on both arms and legs at once is sometimes known as a four-point restraint.

=== Leather restraints ===
Leather restraints are used for strong patients for whom soft restraints fail to prevent escape. They can be applied around the waist, or to individual limbs.

All restraints require a physician's order to be applied. While fabric restraints can be applied by a nurse temporarily while awaiting for a physician's order in an acute care setting, leather restraints can only be applied if pre-authorized by a physician.

=== Metal restraints ===
Metal restraints are usually made of stainless steel. They are used for patients for whom fabric and leather restraints fail to prevent escape. But legally, they can only be used with a court order and with a member of law enforcement present within 500 feet without the use of an elevator or more than one flight of steps up or two down.

Metal restraints are only permitted to be used on patients who are in legal custody or whose behavior in the health care setting is of a criminal nature (e. g. assaulting or making verbal threats of assault toward health care worker). Most jurisdictions have judges on call 24 hours who can issue court orders promptly when necessary.

== Usage in treatment ==
Limb restraints are often used on a combative or disoriented patient who is using their arms or legs to strike at staff or others, to pull important medical apparatus, such as an IV tube or catheter, out of their body, or to otherwise interfere with their care. Arm restraints also become necessary when a patient must lie on their back at all times.

Patients who may come in need of limb restraints include those who have suffered a head injury, those recovering from seizures (usually multiple ones), have been under anesthesia for a long period of time, or those suffering from mental illness, dementia, or side effects from their treatment.

=== Safety ===
Four-point restraints heavily restrict the movement of a patient, and may render the patient helpless when they needs to move in an emergency. Many facilities will hire a companion to watch a patient who is placed under four-point restraint.

=== Escaping restraints ===
Most patients who find themselves restrained naturally think they can free themselves by pulling hard at the restraints. But the restraints are made out of plastic mesh, which cannot be broken by being pulled with human strength. Other patients attempt to unfasten the restraints around the wrist, but find they cannot reach the fastener unless they have abnormally flexible joints. Some do manage to slip their hands through the cuff, though competent workers prevent this from happening.

The easiest way to free oneself from restraints is to reach with one hand to the side of the bed, which is possible. There, the restraint is tied and can be easily untied. After freeing one arm, it is easy to use it to free the other. The patients who seem to know this the most are those who have previously worked in acute health care settings

== Other uses ==
Limb restraints are a sexual fetish for some people, and are used in some BDSM activities, such as in spread eagle bondage.

== See also ==
- Posey vest
