= Community Alliance for the Ethical Treatment of Youth =

U.S. organization

Community Alliance For the Ethical Treatment of Youth
- Founded: 2006; 20 years ago
- Founder: Charles King and Kathryn Whitehead
- Purpose: Children's rights, youth rights
- Location: Washington, DC
- Region served: United States
- Key people: Executive director Kathryn Whitehead
- Volunteers: 50

The Community Alliance For the Ethical Treatment of Youth (CAFETY) is an advocacy group for people enrolled in residential treatment programs for at-risk teenagers. The group's mission includes advocating for access to advocates, due process, alternatives to aversive behavioral interventions, and alternatives to restraints and seclusion for young people in treatment programs. They have also called for the routine reporting of abuse in residential treatment programs, as well as federal government oversight and regulation of residential treatment programs.

== Structure ==
CAFETY is registered as a nonprofit corporation in New York. It is governed by a volunteer board of directors and also maintains an advisory board.

CAFETY's current executive director is Kathryn Whitehead. As one of its key spokespeople, she has been featured in Mother Jones, Time and The NewStandard. Whitehead's and CAFETY's work on the issues of trauma and human rights abuses of youth in residential care, respectively, has also been published in the American Journal of Orthopsychiatry.

== History ==
CAFETY was founded in 2006 by Charles King and Kathryn Whitehead, with the goal: "to create a forum for youth advocacy and support designed to develop and shape youth-guided policies and practices with a specific emphasis on the ethical treatment of youth with behavioral, emotional, and mental health problems in institutional settings". By July of that year, CAFETY had 118 members and 8 core group members from across the United States, including at least one medical professional.

== Campaigns ==
CAFETYs' 'Care, NOT Coercion' Campaign seeks to end institutionalized child abuse and human rights violations in institutional settings. The organization additionally advocates for the regulation of, and the efficacy in treatment in such settings. In pursuit of that objective, CAFETY has chiefly focused its efforts on actively mobilizing its members in public education efforts and supporting and providing testimony in support of legislation aimed at the regulation of residential treatment facilities in the United States.

== Public activism and outreach ==
From late 2007 through 2008, a broad coalition of grass roots efforts, prominent medical and psychological organizations that included members of CAFETY, provided testimony and support that led to the creation of the Stop Child Abuse in Residential Programs for Teens Act of 2008 by the United States Congress Committee on Education and Labor.

In support of this effort, Jon Martin-Crawford, a member of the group's board of directors and Kathryn Whitehead, the group's executive director, appeared at a hearing before the United States Congress Committee on Education and Labor on April 24, 2008, where they described abusive practices they had experienced at the Family Foundation School and Mission Mountain School, both therapeutic boarding schools.

On February 19, 2009, CAFETY co-sponsored a press briefing on Capitol Hill in an effort to raise awareness of youth maltreatment in residential care.

In October 2009, the CAFETY sent an unsolicited mass-mailing to 4,000 residents of Delaware County, using a mailing list compiled by "going through the white pages of Delaware County phone books" alerting the residents of abuse allegations at a local therapeutic boarding school called the Family Foundation School. The two page mailing included a page of excerpts from alumni testimony alleging abuse. The allegations in the letter were dismissed by Jeff Brain, the Family Foundation School's vice president for external relations and acting director of admissions by telling a newspaper that "all the allegations are categorically untrue or grossly exaggerated ... and determined to be unfounded."

CAFETY and its members also held a teens' rights rally held in Gainesville, Florida. At the rally, Chris Noroski, vice president of CAFETY, stated that while he was at the Family Foundation School in Hancock, New York, he was mentally and physically abused, stating "For seven months of the time, I carried buckets of rocks back and forth".

On April 5, 2011, CAFETY was quoted in an article for Time called "Increasingly, Internet Activism Helps Shutter Abusive 'Troubled Teen' Boot Camps".

CAFETY, along with the American Psychological Association, Bazelon Center for Mental Health Law, American Academy of Child and Adolescent Therapy, and the American Bar Association, was a major supporter of the bill H.R 911, "Stop Child Abuse in Residential Programs for Teens Act", which was introduced in the U.S. Congress in 2009 and passed in the House of Representatives, but was not acted upon in the Senate and did not become law.

== See also ==
- History of youth rights in the United States
- Timeline of children's rights in the United States
