= Matthew Israel =

American behavioral psychologist (born 1933)

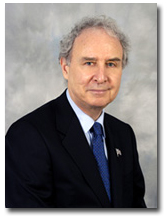
- Photo of Israel
- Born: Matthew Lewis Israel; May 27, 1933 (age 93); Boston, Massachusetts, U.S.
- Spouse: Judith Weber-Israel (m. 2006; died 2024)

Academic background
- Education: Harvard University

Academic work
- Discipline: Behavioral psychology
- Institutions: Judge Rotenberg Center

Matthew Lewis Israel (born May 27, 1933) is a controversial American behavioral psychologist who is known for founding the Judge Rotenberg Center and inventing the Graduated Electronic Decelerator, a device used by the center on disabled students, and condemned as torture by advocacy groups and the United Nations Special Rapporteur on Torture.

As a freshman in college, Israel read B. F. Skinner's novel, Walden Two, in which the heroes build a utopia by conditioning the residents of a commune through the behaviorist principles of reward and punishment. Israel said that reading Walden Two was like a "religious conversion" for him. After reading the book, Israel devoted himself to making the utopia described in it a reality. Israel said that the period between reading the book and his first attempts to start the utopia was a very difficult time of his life. "I thought about committing suicide", he said. "If I couldn't bring a community into existence, [in] what sense was life worth living?" Israel went on to study behaviorism under B. F. Skinner and to receive his Ph.D. from Harvard University in 1960.

In 1966, Israel attended a Walden Two conference, where he shared ideas with Walden Two enthusiasts about how to start the utopia. Israel created the Association of Social Design, an organization for people trying to create behaviorist communities on the principles laid out in Walden Two. In 1967 Israel tried for the first time to build a utopia modeled after Walden Two by starting a small communal house in Arlington, Massachusetts. While at the house, Israel met a 3-year-old resident whose mother allowed him to perform behavioral experiments on her. Israel learned that with the use of punishment, he could control and reshape her behavior as he desired. When his first attempt to build a utopia failed, he tried a second time. The second attempt also quickly failed. Israel believed that the reason the experiments had failed was because he had too little control over the participants, and because they all had the option to move out.

Israel then decided to build a school for people with disabilities, as he knew that he would be able to practice behaviorism on them with very few restrictions. After starting the Judge Rotenberg Educational Center, he gave up on further attempts to build a utopia because he was getting so much satisfaction from running the school. The school has since been condemned for torture by the United Nations special rapporteur on torture. In 2011, Israel was indicted on criminal charges of child endangerment, obstructing justice, and acting as an accessory after the fact. He was forced to resign his position at the JRC as part of a plea deal to avoid prosecution.

== Biography ==
=== Early life and education ===
In 1950, Israel enrolled at Harvard University as a Fine Arts major, having found "traditional psychology difficult to take". In his freshman year he took a class in behaviorism with B. F. Skinner to get a required science credit. During this time he read Skinner's book, Walden Two, in which the heroes build a utopia by conditioning the residents of a commune through the behaviorist principles of reward and punishment. Israel said that reading Walden Two was like a "religious conversion" for him. After reading the book, he devoted himself to making the utopia described in it a reality.

I knew what I wanted to do with my life... I wanted to start a real utopian behavioral community.

—Matthew Israel

=== Attempts to build a utopia ===
After graduating from Harvard in 1960, Israel started a firm for the design and marketing of B. F. Skinner's teaching machines, with the hope of raising enough capital to establish a community in the form of Walden Two. The firm was unsuccessful, and after several years he closed it down and went on with his plans to build the community anyway. In 1966, Israel attended a Walden Two conference, where he shared ideas with Walden Two enthusiasts about how to start the behaviorist utopia. Israel created the Association of Social Design (ASD), an organization for people trying to create behaviorist communities on the principles laid out in Walden Two. Israel planned for the commune that they would create to be called Walden Three.

In a correspondence with a couple named Dan and Marnie who were interested in the project, Israel suggested that Marnie would be expected to have sex with him if they joined the commune. After a series of letters between Israel and Dan, in which Marnie's opinion on the matter was not at any point discussed, the couple decided not to join.

In 1967, Israel tried for the first time to build a utopian commune modeled after Walden Two by starting a small communal house in Arlington. One resident at the Arlington house was a three-year-old girl who was poorly behaved. The girl's mother agreed to let Israel try to modify her behavior: he described the use of positive reinforcement, time-out, and physical punishment. Israel reports that he did not see significant changes in her behavior until he disciplined her with physical punishment in the form of a slap across the face. He also noticed that using physical punishment, he could make her stop crying. After working with her for some time, Israel reported that he could control the child's behavior with just a glance or a shake of the head. From that point on, Israel said, "Instead of being an annoyance, she became a charming addition, a charming individual to the house".

=== Behavior Research Institute ===
After performing behavioral experiments on six autistic children at the Bradly Hospital, Israel founded the Behavior Research Institute in 1971 (which later changed its name to the Judge Rotenberg Center). Israel insisted that the first employees of the school had to be people interested in Walden Two, though he later had to drop that requirement to keep the institute well-staffed. However, Israel reports that the school still shared many similarities with the town in Walden Two.

Walden Two was a comprehensive environment. The notion was that you needed to have the whole environment under control. With a school like this, we have an awful lot. Not the whole environment, but an awful lot.

— Matthew Israel

After a few years, he gave up on further attempts to build a utopian community because he was getting so much satisfaction from running the school.

In 1977, the California Department of Health rejected Israel's application for a license to operate a group home, citing lack of meaningful peer review, and unnecessary use of painful aversives. The department also found that there was insufficient evidence to show that Israel was "reputable and responsible" and that he had the ability to comply with regulations. Furthermore, the department found that Israel was unlawfully practicing psychology without a license in the state of California. Without a license to operate, the school was scheduled to shut down. But the day after the scheduled shut down, a group of parents reopened it as a co-op, moving Israel's official position of executive director to consultant. The school then applied for a license from the state of California to operate a group home, and for a permit to use aversives. With the aid of the California Governor Pat Brown, whose law firm was hired to represent the school, the school was granted licensure to operate as a group home, as well as the only permit ever granted by the state of California to use physical aversives on its students.

Following the death of a student and an investigation by the State of California, in 1981 the institute was barred from using physical aversives, employing restraints, and withholding meals as punishment. The Institute soon after moved its main center of operation to Massachusetts. While corporal punishment was against the law in Massachusetts, the institute was granted special permission to use aversives in 1983. The institute was welcomed by some state officials due to its near-zero rejection rate, as it was willing to take the state's most difficult students.

No matter how big, how old, how disgusting the student, we won't say no.

— Matthew Israel

=== Judge Rotenberg Educational Center ===
JRC moved from its original location near Providence, Rhode Island to its current facilities in Canton, Massachusetts in 1996. The town of Canton shares a name with the fictional city in Walden Two. Six students have died of preventable causes at the school since it opened in 1971. The school has since been condemned for torture by the United Nations special rapporteur on torture. In 2011, Israel was indicted on criminal charges of child endangerment, obstructing justice, and acting as an accessory after the fact. He was forced to resign his position at the JRC as part of a plea deal to avoid prosecution.

== Aversive conditioning ==
The use of aversive conditioning is not a medically accepted treatment for self-harm or aggression. The medically accepted treatment for these and other concerning behaviors is functional analysis. As better positive behavior support interventions have been developed, the use of aversives to modify behavior in children and adults with disabilities is more and more frequently viewed as unethical. There is medical consensus that positive behavior support alone is safer and more effective than behavior modification with the use of aversives.

Paul Touchette, an autism expert and behaviorist who trained under B. F. Skinner, has expressed disapproval of Israel's methods.

He's a very smart man, but he's an embarrassment to his profession. I've never been able to figure out if Matt is a little off-kilter and actually believes all this stuff, or whether he's just a clever businessman.

— Paul Touchette

== See also ==
- Tobinworld
