= Aversion therapy =

Form of psychological treatment

- ICD-9-CM: 94.33
- MeSH: D001348

Aversion therapy is a behavioral treatment that aims to reduce unwanted behavior by pairing it with an unpleasant or uncomfortable experience. For example, a person trying to quit smoking might be exposed to an unpleasant stimulus whenever they encounter something associated with cigarettes. Over time, this repeated pairing is intended to build a negative association with the behavior, making the person less likely to continue smoking.

This approach rests on the idea that people are naturally motivated to seek pleasurable experiences and avoid discomfort. Behaviors that activate the brain's reward tend to be repeated because they produce positive feelings, even when those behaviors are unhealthy or harmful.

The underlying mechanism of aversion therapy is rooted in classical conditioning, the same principle Watson and Rayner used to demonstrate a conditioned fear response in the Little Albert experiment. Just as Watson paired a neutral stimulus (a rat) with an unpleasant one (a loud noise), modern virtual reality (VR) aversion therapy pairs substance-related cues, such as drug paraphernalia in a stimulated environment, with unpleasant stimuli and negative consequences. The goal is to build an aversion association that reduces cravings.

== Treatment effectiveness ==
=== Alcohol addiction ===
Alcohol dependency is associated with strong cravings, repeated relapse, and difficulty controlling alcohol intake. Researchers have suggested that aversion therapy may reduce alcohol use by creating negative associations with alcohol-related cues. Traditional aversion therapy often involves experiences, such as nausea or discomfort, to decrease the desire to drink. In a study by Zhaeo et al. (2026), virtual reality technology was used to deliver aversion therapy through immersive scenarios depicting the harmful consequences of alcohol use. The researchers found that participants who received virtual reality-based aversion therapy, when combined with cue exposure therapy, demonstrated a greater reduction in alcohol cravings and alcohol-related attentional bias than participants who received standard alcohol treatment. According to Zhao et al. (2026) , the intervention helped participants develop negative emotional responses toward alcohol- related stimuli while reducing their focus on alcohol cues.

=== Substance abuse treatment outcomes ===
Sadeghi et al. (2025) conducted a pilot study examining the ineffectiveness of virtual reality based aversion therapy in 90 patients undergoing methadone maintenance therapy for substance use disorders, comparing it to psychological counseling and to methadone alone over a 12-week period. In the VR simulation, participants entered a messy room and were rewarded for tidying it, but encountered drug paraphernalia along the way; touching them triggered an unpleasant sound, reinforcing avoidance of drug-related cues. The researchers found that participants who received virtual reality aversion therapy experienced significantly greater reduction in substance craving, depressive symptoms, and feelings of loss of control compared to those who received psychological counseling or methadone treatment alone. The aversion therapy group also demonstrated a significant improvement in self-efficacy, suggesting that participants became more confident in their ability to resist substance use and maintain recovery. These findings suggest that virtual reality may offer a more realistic and engaging way to recondition responses to substance-related triggers than traditional methods.

=== Smoking cessation ===
Smoking cessation is a behavioral intervention in which aversion therapy is used to reduce addictive behaviors. Aversion therapy works by pairing smoking with an unpleasant stimulus to create a negative association with tobacco use, with the goal of reducing cravings and discouraging future smoking. In a randomized study by Saeed et al. (2019), sixty smokers were divided into three groups: one receiving brief behavioral counseling alone, one receiving counseling combined with nicotine gum, and one receiving mousseline combined with aversion therapy using onion-powdered cigarettes. The researchers found that the aversion therapy group achieved a success rate comparable to the standard counseling group, while the nicotine gum group showed a somewhat higher partial success rate. These findings suggest that aversion therapy may serve as a viable adjunct to behavioral therapy, though it did not outperform standard nicotine replacement approaches in this study.

=== Overall effectiveness ===
Taken together, these findings suggest that aversion therapy remains a versatile tool across a range of addictive behaviors, from alcohol and substance use disorders to smoking cessation. Virtual reality based approaches, in particular, appear to offer notable advantages over traditional aversion methods, producing stronger reductions in craving and greater improvements in self-efficacy by immersing patients in realistic, controlled scenarios rather than relying on physical aversive stimuli alone. However, the evidence base remains relatively limited, with most studies involving small sample sizes and short follow-up periods. Further research, particularly long-term and large-scale trials, is needed to determine whether these early gains translate into durable, lasting behavior change across different populations and forms of addiction.

== Famous psychologist's theory ==
Pavlov's theory of classical conditioning explains why aversion therapy can be effective. By repeatedly pairing an unwanted behavior with an unpleasant stimulus, individuals begin to develop a conditioned negative response that reduces the desire to engage in that behavior. Research suggests that aversion therapy may be particularly effective for treating alcohol disorders, smoking, and compulsive behaviors when combined with evidence-based treatments such as cognitive behavioral therapy. Treatment outcomes vary depending on individual motivation, consistency of treatment, and long-term support.

== Theoretical foundation ==
Aversion therapy is based on the principles of Pavlovian (classical) conditioning, which explains how learned associations can influence behavior. According to Laing et al. (2025), learning occurs when individuals repeatedly associate a stimulus with a particular outcome. Through repeated pairings, behaviors that were once rewarding can become associated with unpleasant consequences. This learning process forms the theoretical basis of aversion therapy, which seeks to reduce a harmful behavior by replacing positive associations with negative ones.

== Recent research ==
Recent research by Laing et al. (2025) expands on Pavlov's theory of classical conditioning by examining how new learning influences behavioral change. The authors explain that new associations do not erase previously learned responses, but instead compete with them through inhibitory learning and conditioned inhibition. These findings are important for aversion therapy because they suggest that treatment works by creating stronger competing associations rather than permanently eliminating unwanted behaviors. The review also highlights that prediction errors and repeated learning experiences strengthen new behavioral responses, providing additional support for conditioning-based interventions.

== See also ==
- Negative reinforcement
- Stimulus control
- Ivan Pavlov
