= Assessment of basic language and learning skills =

Child development assessment tool

The assessment of basic language and learning skills (ABLLS, often pronounced "ables") is an educational tool used frequently with applied behavior analysis (ABA) to measure the basic linguistic and functional skills of an individual with developmental delays or disabilities.

== Development ==
The revised assessment of basic language and learning skills (ABLLS-R) is an assessment tool, curriculum guide, and skills-tracking system used to help guide the instruction of language and critical learner skills for children with autism or other developmental disabilities. It provides a comprehensive review of 544 skills from 25 skill areas including language, social interaction, self-help, academic and motor skills that most typically developing children acquire prior to entering kindergarten. Expressive language skills are assessed based upon the behavioral analysis of language as presented by B.F. Skinner in his book Verbal Behavior (1957). The task items within each skill area are arranged from simpler to more complex tasks. This practical tool facilitates the identification of skills needed by the child to effectively communicate and learn from everyday experiences. The information obtained from this assessment allows parents and professionals to pinpoint obstacles that have been preventing a child from acquiring new skills and to develop a comprehensive language-based curriculum.

The ABLLS-R comprises two documents. The ABLLS-R Protocol is used to score the child's performance on the task items and provides 15 appendices that allow for the tracking of a variety of specific skills that are included in the assessment. The ABLLS-R Guide provides information about the features of the ABLLS-R, how to correctly score items, and how to develop Individualized Education Program (IEP) goals and objectives that clearly define and target the learning needs of a student.

The original version was first released in 1998 by Behavior Analysts, Inc. and was developed by James W. Partington, Ph.D., BCBA-D and Mark L. Sundberg, Ph.D, BCBA-D. It was revised in 2006 by Partington. The revised version incorporates many new task items and provides a more specific sequence in the developmental order of items within the various skill areas. Significant changes were made in the revised version of the vocal imitation section with input from Denise Senick-Pirri, SLP-CCC. Additional improvements were made to incorporate items associated with social interaction skills, motor imitation and other joint attention skills, and to ensure the fluent use of established skills. Dr. Mark Sundberg, later went on to author his Verbal Behavioral assessment called the VB-MAPP in 2008.

Another assessment tool for learning is the International Development and Early Learning Assessment. This tool is used to measure and compare a child's, usually between the ages of three and six years, behavioral development and learning capabilities in other countries. Countries that used IDELA included Afghanistan, Bolivia, Ethiopia, Uganda, and Vietnam. The IDELA is based on a child's emergent literacy, emergent numeracy, Social-emotional skills, and motor skills.

== WebABLLS and normative data ==
The WebABLLS is an electronic version of the assessment. It allows parents, teachers, speech pathologists, behavior analysts, and others who design, coordinate, or supervise language or skill-acquisition programs to expedite the development of IEPs, progress reports, and to easily share information about a child. The WebABLLS provides videos of many skills that are measured by the ABLLS-R and can be used to demonstrate those specific skills.

Over the past four years, parents, relatives and friends of typically developing children have been participating in an ongoing research project by entering data into the WebABLLS. The data are collected by parents or professionals who both know the children and have received training in the administration of the ABLLS-R. The data are updated at three-month intervals (i.e., 6 months, 9 months, 12 months) in order to track the specific changes in skills over the course of the children's development. These preliminary data have been collected in a systematic manner to provide information about when each skill measured by the ABLLS-R is usually acquired by typically developing children.

The preliminary data from this research project are from 81 children (42 females and 39 males) ranging in age from 6 months to 60 months. Children are from a variety of geographical locations (both nationally and internationally) and of differing ethnic, socio-economic and educational backgrounds. The average percent of the total possible scores along with the range from the highest to the lowest scores for the sample at each 3-month age intervals are presented. The data clearly indicate that typically developing children demonstrate most of the basic language and learning skills measured by the ABLLS-R by the time they are 4 to 5 years of age.

== Usage ==
While the ABLLS-R is most commonly used on children with developmental disabilities and delays (including autism), it can be used for anyone who may be lacking in basic communication or life skills.

It assesses the strengths and weaknesses of an individual in each of the 25 skill sets. Each skill set is broken down into multiple skills, ordered by typical development or complexity. So, a skill of F1 (Requests by indicating) is a simpler skill than F12 (Requesting Help). Usually, lower level skills are needed before proceeding to teach higher skills. However, many individuals display splinter skills that are above their practical level.

The ABLLS-R is conducted via observation of the child's behavior in each skill area. The instructor will provide a stimulus to the child (verbal, hand-over-hand, non-verbal, etc.), and, depending on what the child does (the behavior), determines their skill-level. Some skills are difficult or time-consuming to test; instructors frequently accept anecdotal evidence from parents and other instructors as to a child's ability at a given skill-level.

== Sections ==
The ABLLS-R is split into 25 functional areas, each corresponding to a letter in the alphabet. The sections between the ABLLS and ABLLS-R are similar; it is mostly the skills that vary in number and scope.

The ABLLS-R Sections
Letter	Title	Explanation/Remarks
A	Cooperation & Reinforcer Effectiveness	How well a child responds to motivation and others
B	Visual Performance	The ability to interpret things visually, such as pictures and puzzles.
C	Receptive Language	The ability to understand language.
D	Motor Imitation	Being able to mimic the physical actions of others.
E	Vocal Imitation	Being able to mimic the sounds and words others make. Also called Echoic in ABA
F	Requests	Also called Manding in ABA
G	Labelling	Naming objects, or their features, functions, or classes.
H	Intraverbals	Responding to only the stimulus of words. Objects/motivators not present.
I	Spontaneous Vocalizations	Using language without being prompted.
J	Syntax and Grammar	How well words and sentences are put together.
K	Play and Leisure	Solitary and group play skills.
L	Social Interaction	Abilities regarding interaction with peers and adults.
M	Group Instruction	Ability to learn in a group setting (not just one-on-one).
N	Classroom Routines	Ability to follow rules and common school routines.
O	N/A
P	Generalized Responding	The ability to generalize material learned and use it in real-life or novel situations.
Q	Reading	Alphabet, pre-reading, and reading skills.
R	Math	Numbers, counting, less-more-equal, basic addition and subtraction.
S	Writing	Coloring, drawing, copying, and writing skills.
T	Spelling
U	Dressing	Ability to dress or undress self independently.
V	Eating	Basic self-help skills regarding eating and preparing of food.
W	Grooming	Basic self-help skills regarding grooming and hygiene.
X	Toileting	Basic self-help skills regarding toileting.
Y	Gross Motor Skills	Large motor activities such as: playing ball, swinging, crawling, running, skipping, etc.
Z	Fine Motor Skills	Fine motor activities such as: writing, pegboard, turn pages in a book, cutting, pasting, etc.

== Advantages and disadvantages ==
The following is a very brief list of advantages and disadvantages to using the ABLLS-R assessment.

=== Advantages ===
- Can be conducted by most people with a minimal understanding of applied behavior analysis.
- Addresses basic language, academic, self-help, classroom, and gross and fine motor skill sets.
- Provides quick review for parents and educators to identify skill level of student
- Easy for parents and teachers to communicate about the student's educational programming
- Provides data to indicate the skill level of normal development

=== Disadvantages ===
- Skill lists are not exhaustive (544 skills).
- Skills are mostly in order of childhood development, but every child learns differently.
- Not a fully standardized assessment
- IDELA is too generalized making biased comparisons among international countries.

== See also ==
- Applied behavior analysis
- Autism therapies
- Educational psychology
- Verbal Behavior (book)
- The Analysis of Verbal Behavior (journal)
