= Verbal Behavior Milestones Assessment and Placement Program =

- Purpose: Assess the language and social skills of autistic and other developmentally disabled children

The Verbal Behavior Milestones Assessment and Placement Program (VB-MAPP) is an assessment and skills-tracking system to assess the language, learning and social skills of autistic and other developmentally disabled children. A strong focus of the VB-MAPP is language and social interaction.

== Development ==
The VB-MAPP is based on the principles and procedures of applied behavior analysis (ABA), B.F. Skinner's behavioral analysis of language, verbal behavior and establishment of developmental milestones.

The VB-MAPP was developed by Mark Sundberg, Ph.D., BCBA-D. A contributing author to the VB-MAPP is Barbara Esch, Ph.D., CCC-SLP, BCBA-D, a speech and language pathologist who includes an assessment of speech sounds with a guide for developmental progression called the Early Echoic Skills Assessment (EESA). The EESA was a subset of the VB-MAPP until 2023, when Dr. Esch expanded it to include a program planner, work packet, and a guide on how to use early echoic skills for assessment.

== Usage ==
The VB-MAPP is most commonly used to assess the language and social skills of autistic and other developmentally disabled individuals. It is intended to be used by individuals who have training in ABA and is primarily used by behavior analysts, speech-language pathologists, school psychologists and special educators to assess strengths and weaknesses in skills and behaviors that might impede language and social development. The results of assessment help to prioritize intervention needs, provide feedback to parents and other professionals, guide curriculum planning and track skill acquisition.

== Features ==
The VB-MAPP set contains an individual scoring protocol and a users guide. The main components of the VB-MAPP are:

- Milestones Assessment: Focuses on 170 milestones that serve as the foundation of language, learning and social development.
- Barriers Assessment: Focuses on barriers that may impede the acquisition of new skills.
- Transition Assessment: Serves as a guide for planning the child's educational needs.
- Task Analysis and Skills Tracking: A checklist of skills that support the developmental milestones and can be used for daily curriculum activities and skill tracking.
- Users Guide provides the scoring criteria, examples, tips for the tester and an overview of Skinner's analysis of verbal behavior. Included are placement and Individualized Education Program goals to establish intervention and curriculum priorities that are measurable, meaningful and manageable.

The Milestones Assessment is broken down into three levels:

- Level 1 (0–18 Months)
- Level 2 (18–30 Months)
- Level 3 (30–48 Months)

At Level 1, the child is tested for Mand, Tact, Listener Responding, Visual Perceptual Skills and Matching-to-Sample, Independent Play, Social Behaviour and Social Play, Motor Imitation, Echoic, Spontaneous Vocal Behaviour.

Level 2 adds Listener Responding by Function Feature and Class, Intraverbal, Classroom Routines and Group Skills, Linguistic Structure.

Level 3 adds Reading, Writing, and Mathematics.

== Comparison to other assessments ==
A study by Esch, LaLonde and Esch J.W. in 2010, reviewed 28 commonly used assessment for the treatment of autism and concluded, "Most speech-language assessments in widespread use today evaluate response topographies (forms of responses) alone, without regard for a functional analysis of the causal variables" (p. 166.) For example, 26 of the 28 assessment programs reviewed failed to provide a measure of a student's ability to mand. These authors point out that the VB-MAPP contains a functional analysis of language, including a mand assessment component.

A similar study by Gould, Dixon, Najdowski, Smith and Tarbox in 2011 compares 30 assessments, including the ABLLS-R, Bayley, Brigance ... and the VB-MAPP. The authors reviewed the 30 assessments for: comprehension, targets child development, considers behavior function and not just topography, link from the assessment to curricula targets and useful for tracking child progress over time. The authors concluded: "After reviewing the assessments described above, only four meet our five criteria most closely: the VB-MAPP, Brigance IED-II, VABSII and CIBS-R."

== Use in research ==
The VB-MAPP has been used as a measurement tool in published studies to measure the participants' verbal or social skills:

- Charania, S.M. LeBlanc, L.A., Sabanathan, Narmatha, Ktaetch, I.A., Carr, J.E., & Gunby, K., (2010). Teaching effective hand raising to children with autism during group instruction. Journal of Applied Behavior Analysis, 43, 493–497.
- Esch, B.E., LaLonde, K.B.,& Esch J.W. (2010). Speech and language assessment: A verbal behavior analysis. The Journal of Speech-Language Pathology and Applied Behavior Analysis, 5, 166–191.
- Geiger, K.B., LeBlanc, L.A., Dillon, C.M., & Bates, S.L. (2010). An evaluation of preferences for video and in vivo modeling, Journal of Applied Behavior Analysis, 43, 279–283.
- Grannon, L., & Rehfeldt, R.A. (2012). Emergent intraverbal responses via tact and match-to-sample instruction. Journal of Applied Behavior Analysis, 45, 601–605.
- Gunby, K.V., Carr, J.E., & LeBlanc, L.A. (2010). Teaching abduction-prevention skills to children with autism, Journal of Applied Behavior Analysis, 43, 107–112.
- Causin, K.G., Albert, K.M., Carbone, V.J., & Sweeney-Kerwin, E.J. (2013). The role of joint control in teaching listener responding to children with autism and other developmental disabilities. Research in Autism Spectrum Disorders, 7, 997–1011.
- Kobari-Wright, V.V., (2011). The effects of listener training on naming and categorization by children with autism, unpublished Master's Thesis.
- Koehler-Platten, K., Grow, L.L., Schulze, K.A., Bertone, T., (2013). Using a lag schedule of reinforcement to increase phonemic variability in children with autism spectrum disorders. The Analysis of Verbal Behavior, 29, 71–83.
- Marchese, N.V., Carr, J.E., LeBlanc, L.A., Rosati, T.C., & Conroy, S.A. (2012). The effects of the question "what is this?" on tact training outcomes of children with autism. Journal of Applied Behavior Analysis, 45 (3) 539–547.
- Polick, A.S., Carr, J.E., & Hanney, N.M.A., (2012). A comparison of general and descriptive praise in teaching intraverbal behavior to children with autism. Journal of Applied Behavior Analysis, 45, 593–605.
- Vandbakk, M., Arntzen, E., Gisnaas, A., Antonsen, V., & Gundhus, T., (2012.) Effect of training different classes of verbal behavior to decrease aberrant verbal behavior. The Analysis of Verbal Behavior, 28, 137–144.
