= Natural language procedures =

Natural language training is a set of procedures used by behavior analysts that rely heavily on mand training in the natural environment. These procedures include incidental teaching, functional communication training, and pivotal response treatment, which are used to mirror the natural areas of language use for children. Behavior analytic language training procedures run along a continuum from highly restrictive such as discrete trial training to very nonrestrictive conversationally-based strategies. Natural language falls in the middle of these procedures.

== History ==
Natural language training, sometimes referred to as milieu language training

Natural language training, sometimes referred to as milieu language training emerged from generalization research by Donald Baer. These procedures use free operant principles as opposed to discrete trials. Generalization and maintenance of question-asking by severely retarded individuals. Journal of the Association for the Severely Handicapped, 6, 15–22.</ref> The focus on these procedures was to use concepts closer to the natural environment to reduce prompt dependency and promote generalization. The initial procedure was the incidental teaching procedure.

The natural language training approach is often contrasted with discrete trial approaches. In a discrete trial program there is a clear trial window and only the first response is scored. If the response is incorrect, no reward is delivered and the trainer moves to the next trial. In the milieu language training program (natural language program), the trainer uses a least-to-most response strategy and waits for the correct response to be produced. Research exists showing that over 90% of the studies report good generalization for natural language training procedures.

== Usage ==
Currently, these procedures are used to teach children with autism, language delays, and developmental disabilities. Drawing on a behavior analytic model of child development (see Behavior analysis of child development), these procedures aim to address developmental deficits. Because of their focus on generalization, natural language programs are often recommended when discrete trial programs run into problems. These procedures are also recommended as part of building comprehensive programs for children with autism.

== Techniques ==
Natural language training procedures use a "least to most" prompt strategy. This strategy starts with designing/engineering the environment to increase the chances for language to occur, followed by incidental teaching, time delay, mand training, and modeling the response. Each intervention is used in a successive fashion if the previous intervention does not produce results.
