= Haenen =

Haenen is a surname. Notable people with the surname include:

- Giel Haenen (1934–2024), Dutch footballer
- Gitte Haenen (born 1986), Belgian Paralympic athlete
- Paul Haenen (born 1946), Dutch comedian
- Toby Haenen (born 1973), Australian swimmer
- Tony Haenen (1946–2015), Australian rules footballer

== See also ==
- Hanen
