= Writing in childhood =

Writing abilities developed during early years of life

Writing in childhood is the process of developing writing abilities during the early years of life, generally from infancy to adolescence. Writing in childhood encompasses the growth of writing abilities, including acquiring skills to write letters and words, comprehending grammar and sentence structure, and cultivating the capacity to communicate ideas and feelings through written language, which is very significant as it has an impact on academic achievement, social and emotional growth, and eventual professional accomplishments. Children's experiences with writing and creating texts is an important avenue for self-expression in early childhood. These experiences also support precursors to their later reading and writing development. While the development of children’s writing abilities lies heavily in literacy instruction and social experience, cognitive development has shown to hold an important role. The cognitive aspect of development encompasses the mental processes behind the observed changes in children's writing.

== Four developmental stages ==
Based on what has been discussed in the ontogenesis of writing in childhood and adolescence by Frances Christie (2010), the developmental stages for writing in children could be generally divided into four stages:

=== 1. The emergent stage (6-8 years) ===
The initial stage of writing in childhood is marked by early literacy skills like drawing and scribbling, which become more recognizable as writing as children enhance their fine motor abilities. The development of fine motor abilities, which are activated from practices of tracing and drawing letters and symbols, help children to begin to form letters. This stage is considered important in the development of children's early writing skills because it gives them a fundamental understanding of writing and reading texts. It also lays the foundation for grasping the connection between written and spoken language. Research has shown that during this age range, children experiment with different ways to convey meaning, thus realizing that writing is a symbol of language. During this stage, children begin to grasp the notion that writing represents language, and they test various ways of creating marks on paper to convey meaning. Psychologists have also demonstrated that during these developmental stages, the skills of children are determined by their interactions and the amount of experience they receive at a young age. Executive function development such as memory and self-control, also play a key role during this stage. Research shows that literacy-rich home environments are helpful to emergent writing development by giving the opportunity for the children to interact with storytelling, books and writing materials. These functions allow children to plan and draft their writing tasks. Evidence based practices include combining writing with reading activities to allow children to practice writing for other purposes such as storytelling and writing practical documents. Teachers can integrate these practices of modeling letters into children's early writing experiences to influence an understanding of writing structure.

Research suggests that early writing development has several interacting factors including transcription skills, idea generation and behavioral self-regulation. Self-regulation becomes especially important when children get involved in writing tasks that are more complex.

=== 2. The developing stage (7-9 years) ===
This stage, also referred to as the transitional stage, is characterized by an increasing level of control over writing, including a more sophisticated understanding of grammar, spelling, and punctuation. Children at this stage begin to write more complex sentences and paragraphs, and they are able to communicate their ideas more effectively. At this stage, the curriculum plays an important role in the children's skill development. Research has shown that support from teachers such as writing activities are strongly correlated with improved writing outcomes. Children may also experiment with different writing styles and genres as they continue to refine their skills.

One of the key aspects of the developing stage is the increased focus on writing for different purposes and audiences. Children at this stage are encouraged to write in a variety of genres, such as writing personal narratives, which helps them to develop a deeper understanding of the conventions of different genres and to become more adept at tailoring their writing to different audiences. This stage shows a shift from emergent writing to more conventional writing, as children begin learning and practicing transcription skills and organizing their ideas.

=== 3. The consolidating stage (9-12 years) ===
This stage marks a development in children's writing abilities where they produce more elaborate sentences and paragraphs, owing to their enhanced grasp of grammar and spelling. It is a critical stage because it involves possessing writing abilities and cultivating a more advanced writing style. Children who successfully advance through this stage are better equipped to tackle the requirements of academic writing and other types of written communication.

One important aspect of the developing stage is the emphasis on revising and editing. Children at this stage are encouraged to go back and review their writing, looking for ways to improve clarity, coherence, and effectiveness, and they may also receive feedback from teachers or peers, which helps them to develop a more critical thought.

=== 4. The commanding stage (12-18 years) ===
The final stage of the development of writing in childhood and adolescence is known as the commanding stage It is characterized by mature writing skills, including the ability to write for different purposes and audiences, to use a variety of writing styles and genres, and to revise and edit writing for clarity and effectiveness. At this stage, children have become confident and skilled writers, in control of the grammar and written language conventions, which allows them to use writing to achieve their goals and express their ideas with clarity and precision. This stage represents the culmination of years of developing writing skills and is a key indicator of a child's ability to communicate effectively through writing, preparing them for the demands of academic writing and other forms of written communication in adulthood.

== Principles ==
Some principles are used to identify the different stages of development that children have mastered. These principles are the recurring principle, the generative principle, the inventory principle, and the sign principle. These principles were originally outlined in Marie Clay's book, What Did I Write?, and have been widely accepted.

=== The Recurring Principle ===
This principle is when children understand the repetition of patterns and shapes in English writing. Some examples of these can include scribbles that follow a similar pattern. This repetition is important because it builds cognitive reinforcement for the writing skills that are being taught and learned. This reinforcement will later contribute to the expansion of writing and writing skills in the future. Deborah Wells Rowe and Sandra Jo Wilson wrote in their article, The Development of a Descriptive Measure of Early Childhood Writing: Results From the Write Start! Writing Assessment, "To participate as writers, children had to construct understandings about what writing marks look like and how writers choose which kinds of marks to make."

=== Generating Principle ===
This principle describes when children reorganize a limited set of units and create new meanings by experimenting with the way they are combined or arranged. This can be illustrated through the use of letters, however this principle focuses on exploration and creating new combinations rather than precise word formation.

=== Inventory Principle ===
In this principle, children often inventory items by listing them or naming them. This can follow up the form of a list, going downwards in a vertical structure.

=== The Sign Principle ===
This refers to children's understanding of print representing entities that aren't printed, such as word boundaries and page layout. For instance, this can be illustrated by the drawn-out figure of a girl to represent the word girl with different scribbles or letters around the figure.

== Cognitive development in children's writing ==
Writing is a complex process, demanding multiple cognitive processes to operate at once. The major mental processes include planning, translating, and revising. Through the first process of planning, a writer extracts information from their long-term memory to organize and set mental writing goals. Long-term memory holds knowledge related to a topic, an intended audience, genre, and general plans to complete a specific writing task. Translation refers to the process of turning ideas or thoughts from memory into (written) language. The revision process is comparable to editing where the writer evaluates their work for discrepancies and corrects conventional mistakes.

Metacognition and cognitive control in children’s writing are fundamental processes of effective writing. Metacognition is referred to as the conscious regulation and control of cognitive activities, which utilizes possessed knowledge of oneself, the task, and potential strategies. Younger writers tend to struggle with coordinating multiple writing processes at once as they rely on the “retrieve-and-write” strategy where ideas recalled from memory are immediately written, without planning or revising. This strategy requires less cognitive demand and results in disorganized, incoherent writing. As young writers gain more writing experience, their metacognitive control increases allowing them to carry out the writing process more effectively.

== Other kinds of learning in childhood ==
=== Learning handwriting ===
Handwriting, defined as the ability to produce legible and quick writing by Dinehart, are closely related to writing in childhood, for developing handwriting skills in early childhood supports the advancement of some writing skills, such as reading and understanding of contextual cues, which might link to later academic success.

- Support of development of reading skills

Handwriting has been shown to be connected to writing development. The first developmental stages of writing starts around the age of two, where children begin to produce random scribbles. They will eventually advance to marks of horizontal and vertical strokes. Around the ages of three to five, children start to realize that the marks and scribbles they make are in relation to writing.

Research indicates that handwriting and reading share neural pathways and the cognitive processes involved in handwriting, such as letter formation and letter-sound relationships, are also involved in reading acquisition. Additionally, the physical act of writing helps children develop visual and spatial awareness, fine motor skills, and hand-eye coordination, which are also important for reading process.

- Handwriting readiness and the likelihood of later academic success

Handwriting readiness refers to a child's preparedness for learning handwriting skills, which includes aspects such as cognitive, motor, and perceptual abilities. Research suggests that handwriting readiness is a significant predictor of academic success in later years, as it is related to overall school readiness and performance. For example, children who have difficulty with handwriting readiness in kindergarten are more likely to experience difficulties in literacy and math in later grades. Therefore, it is important for educators to provide opportunities for children to develop their handwriting skills and readiness in early childhood education.

=== Learning from adults ===
As Rowe mentions in her article, children's writing skills in childhood are influenced by their interaction with adults, such as parents and caregivers, who expose them to language and literacy from a young age. Children learn intentionality through joint participation in writing with adults, focusing on five key patterns:

1. The joint negotiation of textual intentions - Children and adults work together to establish a shared understanding of what they want to write and how they want to write it, and children learn to take on a more active role in this process as they gain experience and confidence, and this collaborative approach helps children to develop their writing skills and to see themselves as writers.
2. Pedagogical mode of address - Adults play a crucial role in helping children to learn writing by using a specific pedagogical mode of address. This pattern involves speaking to children in a way that is clear, supportive, and structured, hence providing them with the guidance they need to understand the writing process and to develop their skills, and by mimicking this mode of address, adults help children to become more confident and independent writers.
3. Use of existing resources to take up roles as writers - Children also learn writing by imitating adults in their use of existing resources to take up roles as writers. Rowe's study found that children are particularly adept at using the physical tools of writing, like pencils and papers, to construct their own writing identities, and by mimicking adults in their use of these resources, children are able to develop their own writing skills and to see themselves as active participants in the writing process.
4. Changes in participation - Children's participation in the writing process changes over time as they gain experience and confidence. Initially, children may be more passive in their participation. Nevertheless, as they gain more experience though the observation, they become more active participants in the writing process, making decisions about what to write and how to write it.
5. Agency in shaping their participation as writers - Children possess agency in shaping their participation as writers. In other words, they are not simply passive learners, but active participants who have their own ideas and perspectives. By participating in the writing process, children are able to shape their own identities as writers and develop their own unique writing styles.

=== Learning from teachers ===
Teachers play a crucial role in enhancing children's writing development, primarily during the elementary years when cognitive skills transform into well structured writing. Research in classroom instruction has shown different practices used to teach writing. Examples of this are traditional writing instruction, process-oriented instruction such as writing workshops, genre-based approach to writing, and also a blend of the different teaching practices. Research underscores the value of evidence-based practices in fostering these skills. Troia explains these strategies such as explicit instruction in writing processes (e.g., planning, drafting, and revising) and combining writing with reading activities as help. Similarly, the U.S. Department of Education emphasizes the importance of creating opportunities for collaborative writing, providing timely peer and instructor review, and incorporating technology to support writing instructions. Instruction that targets weaker skills such as transcription skills and discourse-level language skills, can also improve writing outcomes in developing writers.

These evidence-based practices both improve the writing abilities of students and contribute to their broader literacy development. For instance, practices such as the transformation from scribbling into writing letters helps children make connections between written and spoken language, while collaborative activities improve the flow of ideas and foster critical thinking. By implementing these evidence-based practices, teachers help children develop the skills and confidence necessary to become proficient writers and learners.

A recent study suggests that preschool teachers who hold graduate degrees are more likely to provide quality instruction. In addition, the research has shown that when a pre-school teacher lacks experience, it would be better to work alongside a colleague who has abundant experience in order to provide the young children with the necessary support to achieve success later in their education.

== The role of parents and caregivers ==
The role of parents and caregivers in supporting children's early writing development is critical, as their involvement in literacy practices shapes how children understand and develop writing skills. Research emphasizes the value of these interactions. Neuman and Roskos point out that literacy-enriched play settings or homes where caregivers read and engage in writing-related activities help children understand the functions of writing. These environments support children in understanding how writing works in the world around them, such as using labels or writing messages. Additionally, Rand and Morrow argue that play experiences contribute significantly to early literacy by allowing children to engage in pretend writing and storytelling, which in turn helps them understand the structures and functions of narrative writing.

Galda, Pellegrini and Cox emphasize the importance of everyday adult interactions in promoting children's emergent literacy. Their longitudinal study found that when parents read aloud and discuss stories with children, they expose them to vocabulary, storytelling techniques, and organizational strategies needed for writing. Through activities like retelling stories, children learn to put events in order which is an important skill for understanding and writing narratives. According to Brown, this ability to understand and create clear stories is closely linked to the language experiences children have with adults, especially when they retell or organize events from daily life. In this context, parents serve as guides to help children develop the organizational skills needed to write well. Early literacy research has also shown that literacy develops as a continuous process through the child's participation in meaningful social interaction which includes communication, conversation, reading and writing rather than beginning only when formal schooling starts. Such experiences and practices help prepare children for the transition to formal schooling by developing skills that build a foundation to support later reading and writing achievements.

Alber-Morgan discusses how feedback from adults plays a huge role in children's writing development. By providing positive reinforcement and constructive suggestions, caregivers help children refine their skills, improving both their confidence and their writing abilities. These types of feedback, along with a caring and nurturing home environment, allow children to develop their writing in meaningful and supportive ways. By engaging in activities like reading, storytelling, and providing feedback, parents and caregivers create a literacy-rich environment that supports early writing development. Through these interactions, children not only learn the how of writing but also develop a deep understanding of its purpose and structure, laying the foundation for future academic and creative writing.

== Play and early writing development ==
Early childhood is a period of rapid social preference development and appears to be formative for an individual’s social preference in adulthood. Young children don't just learn to write through lessons; they also pick up essential skills through playing. Drawing, pretending, and storytelling are engaging activities that can play an important role in developing writing skills. When children engage in pretend play, they start creating their own stories, organizing events, and even picking up new words to express their ideas. These activities help them understand how stories work and how to communicate their thoughts, which will help when they start writing more formally as they grow.

The study by Neuman and Roskos found that literacy-enriched play areas had a positive impact on preschoolers. Children who spent time in these spaces were much better at understanding how writing works in the real world. Activities like drawing pictures or pretending to write letters give children a chance to see how communication can be visual. Basically, they're learning the building blocks for writing before they even realize it. These play experiences serve as a foundation for more formal writing tasks later in life.

Parents and caregivers also have a big impact. Reading together, talking about stories, and even offering feedback on what kids write at home all help them improve their writing skills. Research by Alber-Morgan, Hessler, and Konrad shows that when adults guide kids through daily activities like writing letters or telling stories, it boosts their writing ability. These home-based interactions set children up for success in school, helping them transition smoothly into more formal writing tasks later on.

== Multimodal writing ==
Multimodal writing refers to the integration of various modes of communication, such as visual, images, textual, and symbolic elements, which support children's writing development. Research highlights the significant role of illustrations and other graphics in gaining early literacy and writing skills. For young children drawing serves as a semiotic resource. It is a way to make meaning and communicate ideas, as well as navigate through text both within and outside of formal educational settings.

=== The role of drawing ===
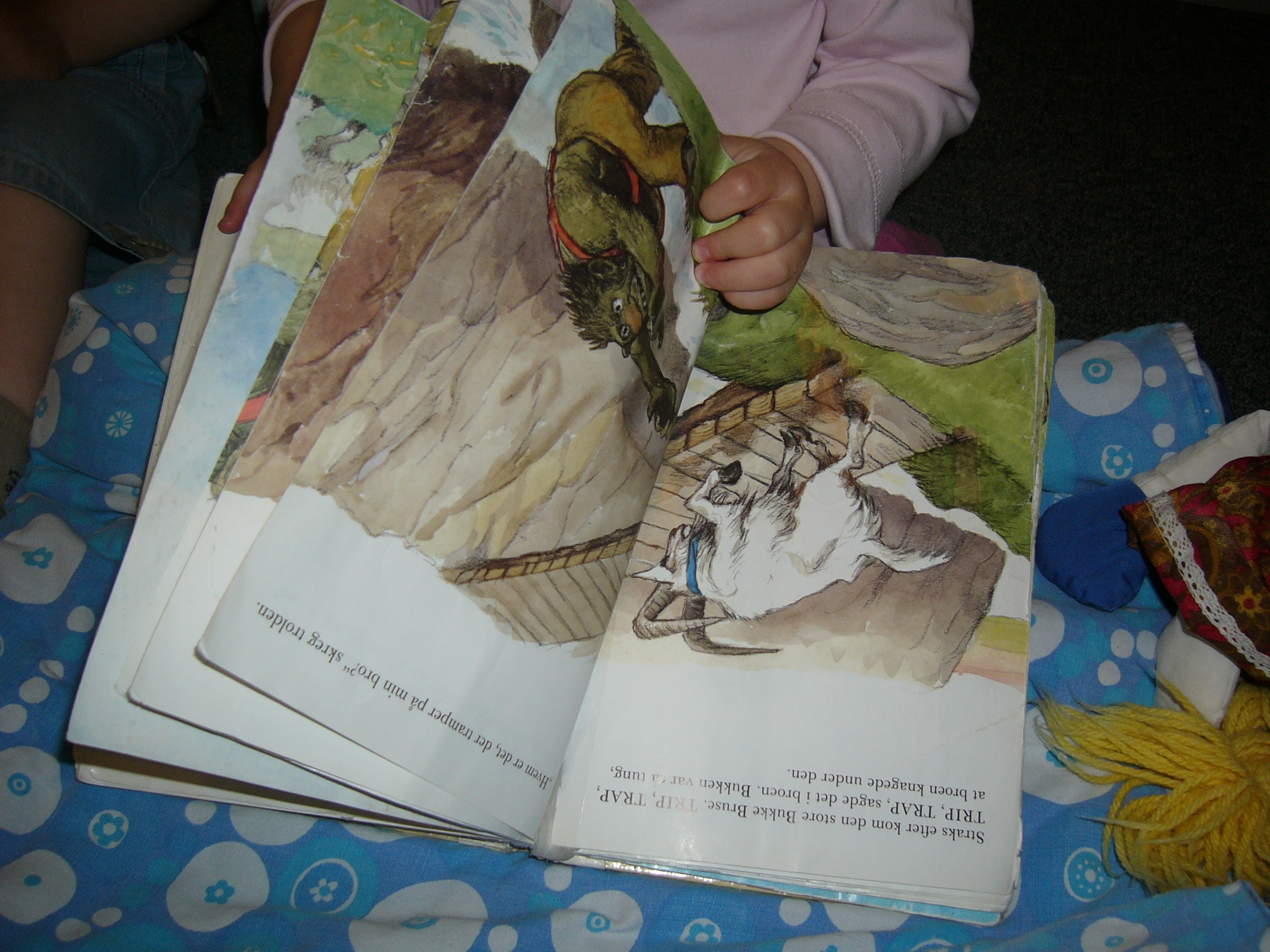
Child's picture book

Studies often demonstrate that drawing plays a pivotal role in children's early stages of writing development. Research on Children's Text Development indicates that five-year-olds often communicate more effectively through drawing rather than writing, as the former allows them to express ideas that may be beyond their written vocabulary. Drawing serves as an essential middle ground for developing classroom literacy in the early years, as seen in Vygotsky's theory, which posits a temporal and maturational link between drawing and writing. As children progress through school and age, however, classroom opportunities for drawing diminish, with traditional writing formats often prioritizing linear, and landscape paper given to students developing into narrow college ruled paper.

Drawing is especially beneficial during the brainstorming stage of writing, enabling children to generate ideas through drawings and engage with writing as a communicative process. Studies suggest drawing to be like a shift into writing. This symbiotic relationship between drawing and writing allows children to interchange pictures and words, forming a creative outlet and a deeper connection to their work. A student from Jones's S. K. study "Notch," shared how he used drawing and writing to organize his thoughts while playing the video game Minecraft. He explained:

"I make the drawings and then I show, and then I put arrows and then say what it is and what kind of block it is...and then since I have these good ideas in my head, eventually I'll make them in the computer."

Notch's example highlights how drawing can serve as a preparation for writing, helping children to structure and develop their ideas.

=== Graphics in text and literacy development ===
Studies also indicate that graphics have been relevant to children's texts since at least the 15th century, with their prevalence increasing each decade since the 1970s. Studies have shown that graphics not only motivate learning but also improve memory and understanding of written material. Young children (ages 6–11) often rely more heavily on pictures than text to infer meaning and make connections to stories. This is because they tend to focus on graphic elements explicitly referenced in accompanying text, while older children gradually shift their attention to the written content.

Researchers of teaching English also identified eight concepts essential for understanding graphics in text: action, intentionality, permanence, relevance, representation, partiality, extension, and importance. However, children vary in their understanding and interpretation of these graphic concepts, influenced by factors such as developmental stage and educational context.

=== Symbolic understanding and visual literacy ===
De Loache and Marzolf's research highlights the unique symbolic properties of pictures. Contrary to models, pictures do not require dual representation, making them more easily accessible and valuable tools for digesting textual information. Children's ability to comprehend the symbolic function of images can significantly impact their learning as well as their cognitive development.

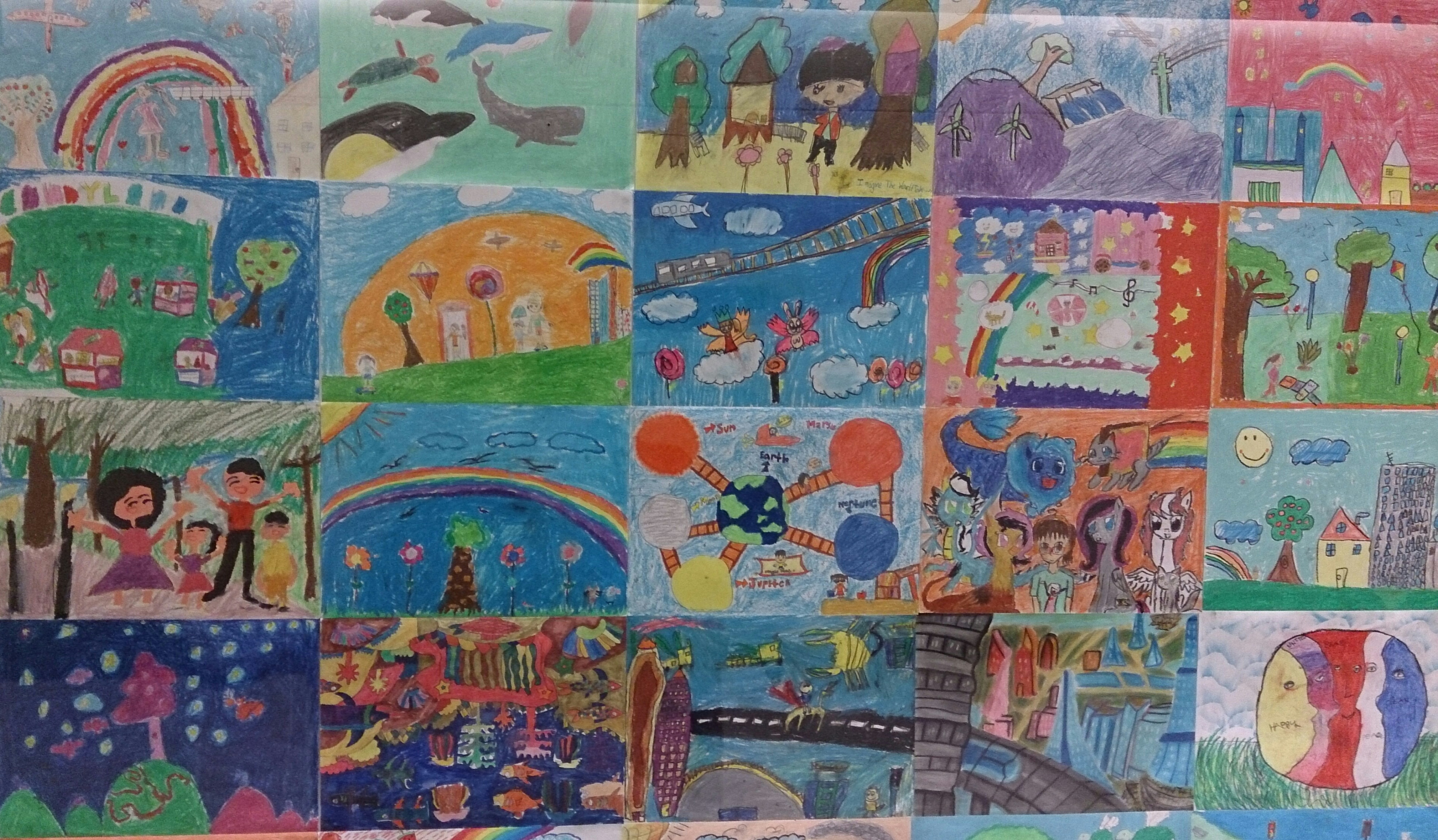

Moreover, Penn's 8 month study on classroom drawing elaborates on how children act as "symbol-weavers," using drawing as a way to construct and communicate critical, creative, and constructive ideas. Drawing fosters a performative transition into writing, where children adopt techniques such as clapping syllables and arm spelling to develop their written expression.

== Other impacts ==
=== Modern culture ===
Anne Haas Dyson, the professor at the University of Illinois, mentions in her article about writing in childhood that while modern culture can provide new opportunities for communication and expression, it can also create challenges and barriers for children as they learn to write in traditional academic contexts. In other words, modern culture exerts impact on writing in children to some extent.

One of the main ways in which modern culture influences children's writing is through the media and popular culture. Children nowadays are exposed to a wide range of media, including television, movies and the internet, which often use language and writing in ways that differ from traditional academic writing, and this exposure could affect the way children view writing as well as their motivations to engage in writing.

In addition, modern culture has also led to changes in the way children use language in their everyday lives. Technology has allowed for tools to aid writing such as word processing, making it easier for children to write. It helps to revise, edit, and organize their words and ideas efficiently. The use of technology and social media has resulted in new forms of communication, such as texting and instant messaging, which have their own unique language and writing conventions, and children who learn these forms of communication may struggle with the conventions of academic writing or may view them as irrelevant to their lives.

Furthermore, modern culture has led to changes in the way children view themselves as writers. The emphasis on standardized testing and academic performance has created pressure on children to produce writing that meets certain standards, which may limit their creativity and self-expression. In addition, the focus on correctness and accuracy in writing may cause children to view writing as a chore rather than a meaningful and enjoyable activity.

=== Genre ===
Generally speaking, Kamberelis argues in his work, entitled 'Genre development and learning: Children writing stories, science reports, and poems', that children's writing is deeply influenced by the genres they encountered because genres can shape their understanding of what constitutes the good writing. Based on several researches conducted by Kamberelis regarding genre types and writing in childhood, they found that each genre have its unique characteristics that children need to learn in order to write effectively. For example, stories required children to develop characters, create a plot, and take the advantage of descriptive language to create a background setting; while poems requires them to focus on the imagination, metaphor, and other literary strategies in order to create a specific effect.

In addition to genre types, Kamberelis' studies also found that children's understanding of various genres can be affected by several factors, including from children's past experiences with reading and writing, cultural and social backgrounds, to teacher's expectations. For instance, children who are more familiar with a particular genre are likely to perform better when they are asked to writing that genre, while children who are not acquainted with it might face difficulties understanding its conventions and expectations, hence making it hard for them to compose in that genre.

== Research debate ==
New research has been conducted that debates the emergent stage in that students learn early literacy skills. Researchers Sulzby and Teale based on Charles Read's study further researched how children as young as 18 months were able to compose letter-like forms and scribbling that showed the intention of writing. Similarly, research by Martins, Junior, and Silva found convincing evidence that backed their argument through the two spelling programmes used to research children. This has led to what they called emergent literacy which describes the reading and writing development in children that have undergone a recent shift.

== Contemporary efforts to advance child writing ==
New advancements in K-12 curriculum in schools in the United States have led to an increase in debates among educators and parents about the disadvantage or advantages it may have among early childhood development in writing and reading.

Common Core stresses the importance of writing as a parallel to reading when it comes to early learning. The three strategies used to advance students' writing are taking dictation, translating kid writing, and creating cooperative chronicles. Taking dictation refers to teaching students how to understand written speech, they can recall records more easily and efficiently. Despite not understanding sound-symbol relationships, translating kid writing refers to the phase where students attempt to write through random marks on paper. Through creating cooperative chronicles, children learn that revising is an important part of writing that they are capable of accomplishing.

Despite this new effort to realize a new curriculum, there has been some widespread debate in discourse communities. Among the concerns was the lack of early childhood development researchers when it came to implementing this and providing guidance to teachers and parents.

== Impact of bilingualism ==
When young bilingual children are exposed to writing in their second language it is often seen that children will use their first language pre-knowledge and apply it to their second language writing skills. This could be seen when Spanish-speaking children begin to apply their Spanish-speaking sounds of words to the spelling and writing of English vowels. It is also found specifically for Spanish-speaking children, strong reading skills in Spanish accounted for better writing in English. Bilingual children also strongly develop audience awareness when they first start writing in their second language because of prior experience from translating for their parents. This helps them understand what type of audience they are writing to and they often switch to writing in the language they know their audience better understands, to accommodate them better. Although bilingual children have some advantages when it comes to writing in their second language, they often face disadvantages as some children are below grade levels in reading leaving them behind from their peers, and even then these children lack extra support from instructors.

Building on these early strengths, newer studies suggest that young bilingual children often develop a good understanding of how writing systems work, even before they are formally taught. For example, children who speak both English and Spanish sometimes use sounds and spelling patterns from one language to help them write in the other. This suggests that they are becoming more aware of how language works.

This understanding grows even more in school and in everyday life. When writing for teachers, classmates, or family, these children might change how they write. They may adjust their language, tone, and even handwriting based on who they are writing for and what they think that person will understand or enjoy. For example, a student might write a letter in Spanish to a family member, but do a classroom project in English or a mix of both, depending on the situation.

This kind of writing, called translingual writing, lets students use both of their languages instead of keeping them separate. Studies suggest that using both languages like this helps students feel more confident and leads to better writing results. It also may provide them with more ways to express themselves and connect with others.

When teachers support this way of writing and value both languages, students may feel more confident and included. Writing becomes more than just a school task. It becomes a way for them to share their feelings, connect with people, and show who they are.

Even with these strengths, many bilingual children still face challenges. Standardized tests and English-only rules often ignore the full range of their skills, especially when those skills involve other languages or different ways of writing. To truly support these students, schools might want to use more inclusive teaching methods that recognize and build on what bilingual students already know and can do.

== Writing from the neurodivergent perspective ==
According to Jurecic, a researcher on neurodivergent writers, "Autism is a neurobiological disorder that often becomes more evident in every early childhood and is characterized by impairments in social interaction and communication, and also fixed and repetitive behavior (diagnostic)." Neurodivergent individuals, such as those with autism, may require more time to comprehend writing instructions, so they can contribute and execute what they have been taught.

A survey of 29 individuals with autism was conducted and from the results, all of these individuals had different techniques and communicated differently to the norm, but they shared something in common, which is needing a support system such as moral support, recommendations on improving or targeting skills. Some of the participants even requested for specific and detailed instructions, while others sought guidance on understanding their audience. This survey offers an insight of these individuals's thinking process, their analysis on a text, and the connections they make to assemble good writing. In addition, other factors and components with regard to neurodivergent people and producing writing is that sensory issues, auditory stimuli, and having the appropriate supplies and space can alter their learning process as well.

In addition, other researchers have done more studies on students with autism and their language domain skills that partake in their writing experience. Both autistic and non autistic children were asked to identify how they approach writing and the different factors that influence their writing process. For example, different writing activities were given to compare the contributions and engagement of both groups of people towards writing certain topics. The writing process is different for everyone. Some find different mechanisms or skills to implement onto their daily tasks. Neurodivergent individuals may have a longer writing process. They may take more steps to create writing since they have a different approach than a neurotypical person.
