= Pivotal response treatment =

Form of applied behavior analysis

Pivotal response treatment (PRT), also referred to as pivotal response training, is a naturalistic form of applied behavior analysis used as an early intervention for children with autism that was invented by Robert Koegel and Lynn Kern Koegel. PRT advocates contend that behavior hinges on "pivotal" behavioral skills—motivation and the ability to respond to multiple cues—and that development of these skills will result in collateral behavioral improvements. It's an alternative approach to ABA from the more common form, sometimes called discrete trial training (DTT).

== History ==
Initial attempts to treat autism were mostly unsuccessful and in the 1960s researchers began to focus on behavioral intervention therapies. Though effective, limitations included significant time investment, considerable expense, and limited generalization to new environments. Lynn and Robert Koegel incorporated ideas from the natural language procedures to develop verbal communication in children with autism. They theorized that, if effort was focused on certain pivotal responses, intervention would be more successful and efficient. As they saw it, developing these pivotal behaviors would result in widespread improvement in other areas.

== Theory ==
Pivotal response treatment is a naturalistic intervention model derived from the principles of applied behavior analysis. Rather than target individual behaviors one at a time, PRT targets pivotal areas of a child's development such as motivation, responsiveness to multiple cues, self-management, and social initiations. By targeting these critical areas, PRT ideally results in collateral improvements in other social, communicative, and behavioral areas that are not specifically targeted.

The underlying motivational strategies of PRT are incorporated throughout intervention as often as possible, and they include child choice, task variation, interspersing maintenance tasks, rewarding attempts, mand training, and the use of direct and natural reinforcers. The child plays a crucial role in determining the activities and objects that will be used in the PRT exchange. Intentful attempts at the target behavior are rewarded with a natural reinforcer (e.g., if a child attempts to request for a stuffed animal, the child receives the animal, not a piece of candy or other unrelated reinforcer). Pivotal response treatment is used to teach language, decrease disruptive/self-stimulatory behaviors, and increase social, communication, and academic skills.

The two primary pivotal areas of pivotal response therapy are motivation and self-initiated activities. Three others are self-management, empathy, and the ability to respond to multiple signals, or cues. Play environments are used to teach pivotal skills, such as turn-taking, communication, and language. This training is child-directed: the child makes choices that direct the therapy. Emphasis is also placed upon the role of parents as primary intervention agents.

== Research ==
A 2020 meta analysis which included 5 RCTs concluded there was a statistically significant positive effect of PRT on expressive language skills, social interaction, and reducing repetitive behaviour. However it also notes the quality of evidence was low, so further research about the effectiveness of PRT was required. One 2019 study, not covered by the review, directly compared PRT and DTT found its effects were heterogenous; DTT worked better in some children, whereas PRT worked better in others, depending on the child's characteristics.
