= International Development and Early Learning Assessment =

The International Development and Early Learning Assessment (IDELA) is a method of measuring early development in children at a pre-primary school level. It was developed for Save the Children between 2011 and 2015.

== Background ==
Cognitive, socio-emotional and physical development during early childhood is crucial to the child's ability to achieve their potential, and to the social and economic health of society as a whole. However, poverty, stunting and lack of intellectual stimulus in low- and middle-income countries damage early development of almost half of all children aged 3 to 4, which will affect them through their lives. One of the main reasons is lack of access to early childhood education programs, particularly for poor, rural families.

Existing tools for ECCD measurement had mostly been used in high-income countries, and were hard to adapt to poorer countries. Often they were costly, and many had limitations such as measuring only one skill or age group, or relying on reports from parents or teachers rather than direct measurement.

== Objectives ==
Before IDELA was developed there were no tools for measuring early Early Childhood Care and Development (ECCD) in low and middle income country that balanced the needs for consistency across different countries, ease of use and psychometric rigor. IDELA was to be a feasible, holistic, rigorous, open source instrument that could easily be adapted to different societies. It would support continuous program improvement across the many field sites of Save the Children and their partners, increase accountability among ECCD initiatives, and provide data about ECCD outcomes that governments and agencies could use to identify and scale up successful ECCD programs.

== Development ==
Development of IDELA began in 2011 based on four early childhood development domains, drawn from existing standards for early childhood education: physical, language/literacy, numeracy/cognitive and social-emotional. Over 65 items were considered at first, but these were reduced to 33 during qualitative review. Between 2013 and 2015 data was collected from 11 sites in different countries. Although there were limitations to the approach, results show that IDELA is a practical and rigorous method of measuring learning and development before children begin their primary schooling.

== Assessment approach ==
Children from 42 to 78 months old can be assessed in about 30 minutes. A trained assessor sits with the child, follows a scripted protocol for each test and observes the child's response. After six of the most challenging tests, and after the child interview, the assessor records whether the child was persistent, motivated and attentive in trying to complete the task. Materials needed are a pencil, blank paper, small items for counting (such as beans or buttons), nine picture cards related to eight items on the assessment, and a storybook that contains pictures and text.

Skills assessed are:

Domain	Skills
Gross and Fine Motor Development	Hopping on one foot; Copying a shape; Drawing a human figure; Folding Paper
Emergent Literacy and Language	Print awareness; Expressive vocabulary; Letter identification; Emergent writing; Initial sound discrimination; Listening comprehension
Emergent Numeracy	Measurement and comparison; Classification/Sorting; Number identification; Shape identification; One-to-one correspondence; Simple operations; Simple problem solving
Socio-emotional Development	Peer relations; Emotional awareness; Empathy; Conflict resolution; Self-awareness

== Results ==
A 2019 study of IDELA results in Afghanistan, Bolivia, Ethiopia, Uganda and Vietnam confirmed that IDELA was useful for evaluating programs and monitoring progress within a country, but found it did not give a valid basis for comparison between countries. A study published in 2021 used data from Ghana to test how well IDELA predicted future skills in reading, as measured by the Early Grade Reading Assessment (EGRA), and in mathematics as measured by the Early Grade Mathematics Assessment (EGMA). Results showed strong correlation, with scores in the Emergent Literacy domain a strong predictor of EGRA scores, and the scores in the Emergent Numeracy domain a strong predictor for EGMA scores.

== See also ==
- Assessment of basic language and learning skills
- Educational psychology

== Sources ==
- About IDELA, IDELA
- Halpin, Peter F.; Wolf, Sharon; Yoshikawa, Hirokazu; Rojas, Natalia; Kabay, Sarah; Pisani, Lauren; Dowd, Amy Jo (January 2019), "Measuring early learning and development across cultures: Invariance of the IDELA across five countries", Developmental Psychology, 55 (1): 23–37
- International Development and Early Learning Assessment Technical Working Paper, Ministerio de Educación del Perú
- Pisani, Lauren; Borisova, Ivelina; Dowd, Amy Jo (2018), "Developing and validating the International Development and Early Learning Assessment (IDELA)", International Journal of Educational Research, 91: 1–15, doi:10.1016/j.ijer.2018.06.007, ISSN 0883-0355
- Pisani, L.; Seiden, J.; Wolf, S. (2022), "Longitudinal evidence on the predictive validity of the International Development and Early Learning Assessment (IDELA)", Educ Asse Eval Acc, 34: 173–194, doi:10.1007/s11092-021-09374-8
