= Emergent literacies =

Early knowledge of reading and writing skills

Emergent literacy is a term that is used to explain a child's knowledge of reading and writing skills before they learn how to read and write words. It signals a belief that, in literate society, young children—even one- and two-year-olds—are in the process of becoming literate. Through the support of parents, caregivers, and educators, a child can successfully progress from emergent to conventional reading.

The basic components of emergent literacy include:

- Print motivation: Being interested in and enjoying books.
- Vocabulary: Knowing the names of things.
- Print awareness: Noticing print, knowing how to handle a book, and knowing how to follow words on a page.
- Narrative skills: Being able to describe things and events and to tell stories.
- Letter knowledge: Understanding letters are different from each other, knowing their names and sounds, and recognizing letters everywhere.
- Phonological awareness: Being able to hear and play with the smaller sounds in words.

Emergent literacy is of critical importance in early education in light of research showing that children learn skills that prepare them to read years before they start school.

== History ==
Traditionally, society has considered reading and writing in their formalistic senses, and viewed children as being knowledgeable about literacy only when they were capable of identifying written words without picture clues, and spelling words that adults could read.

In 1966, New Zealand researcher Marie Clay introduced the concept of emergent reading, using it to describe the earliest behaviors and concepts young children employ in interacting with books even before they are capable of reading in the conventional sense. The 1970s and early 1980s saw robust research activity in children's early language development, early childhood education, and reexamination of the concept of reading readiness. This work resulted in Teale and Sulzby assembling a book authored by various leading researchers of the time that proposed reconceptualizing what happens from birth to the time when children reading and write conventionally as a period of emergent literacy.

Since then, an extensive body of research has expanded the concept, illuminating that a child's literacy development begins well before formal introduction in school, and can be influenced by social interactions with adults, exposure to literacy materials, and the use of engaged learning activities. While the concept of reading readiness suggested that there was a specific point in time after which children were ready to learn to read and write, Clay's notion of emergent literacy suggested that there were continuities in children's literacy development between early literacy behaviors and those displayed once children could read independently. Clay also emphasized the importance of the relationship between writing and reading in early literacy development. Until then, it was believed that children must learn to read before they could learn to write.

According to Whitehurst and Lonigan's model of emergent literacy developed from a cognitive science approach to reading, there are two prominent developmental areas. The areas are inside out skills and outside in skills. Inside out skills include phonological awareness and letter knowledge. Outside in skills include language and conceptual knowledge. These skills develop during different periods of times from birth throughout childhood. Outside in skills are associated with literacy environments. However, the origins of when inside out skills develop are not as clear. What is clear is that interventions that teach outside in skills and inside out skills greatly increase literacy development.

== Emergent literacy skills ==
=== Print motivation ===
This component relates to a child's interest in and enjoyment of books. A child with print motivation might enjoy being read to, playing with books, pretending to write, and going to the library. Children who enjoy books are more likely to want to read, and to keep trying, even when it is hard.

=== Vocabulary ===
The component "vocabulary" relates to the knowing of the names of things. Children with rich vocabularies are at a tremendous educational advantage, since studies show that vocabulary is the best predictor of reading comprehension at the end of second and third grades and is otherwise linked to overall academic achievement.

=== Print awareness ===
This component relates to noticing print, knowing how to handle a book, and knowing how to follow words on a page. It includes knowing that books are organized from left to right, the words are read from left to right and top to bottom, and how to tell words from letters. These skills are invaluable to a child's literacy development because without these skills, a child will have difficulty learning how to read and write.

=== Oral language ===
Emergent literacy can be boiled down to 2 categories. One category is code related skills. Phonological awareness and alphabet knowledge fall under this category. These skills help individuals decode words and read them. The other important category is oral language and vocabulary skills. While code related skills help the students read the words, oral language and vocabulary skills are necessary to help understand the meaning of the text also known as reading comprehension. Oral language includes skills such as: comprehending and producing sentences, inference, vocabulary, and other listening abilities. Code-related skills will only take a reader so far. Once the text becomes more challenging, new vocabulary, ideas and concepts will be harder to understand even if correctly read. Additionally, if a child can read words but do not know what they mean, comprehension will likely suffer as a result. To achieve maximum understanding when reading the reader will need to have strong code related and oral language skills.

There was a study done to determine the amount of influence oral language and code-related skills in pre-k has on reading comprehension 5 years later, in 3rd grade. This was a longitudinal study where the same group of students were tested while in pre-k and again as 3rd graders. 420 students were tested in pre-k with a final group of 305 students in grade 3. The others left the study for a variety of reasons. The students, while in Pre-k, were put through a variety of assessments that tested the following oral language skills: vocabulary, discourse and grammar. These same students were also tested in code related skills: letter and print knowledge and phonological processing. As third graders, the skills that were tested included to measure reading comprehension were listening comprehension and word recognition. Strong relations between the skills tested in Pre-K and how it affects the Grade 3 skills were found. These pre-k skills could be used as a predictor of future reading comprehension ability in 3rd grade. The same study also found the pre-k skills of oral language and code related skills were often very connected. If a student was proficient in oral language they were often just as strong in code related skills and vice versa. However, for the third graders, the skills of listening comprehension and word recognition did not share the same connection. One was not necessarily a good predictor of the other.

=== Narrative skills ===
Narrative skills which are defined as: the ability to tell stories, as well as describing things and events. They can also be defined as the ability to orally present a series of events in a temporally coherent fashion as required to generate or retell a story . These skills often are supported by having conversations with adults. During a read aloud, a child's narrative skills can be supported through conversation and discussion about the book. These skills will help the child understand story structure and may increase a child's understanding and engagement with the reading. There have been mixed studies of how a child's narrative skills are related or correlated with other emerging literacy skills such as decoding skills. Additionally, the evidence has not been concluded about how these skills affect early reading development for children.

In a longitudinal study over two years, 243 children between the ages of 3 and 5.5 were tested to see if there was a concurrent association between narrative, emergent and early literacy skills. These tests included: narrative skills, receptive and expressive language skills, letter knowledge, concepts of print, early word reading, phonological awareness, and letter sound correspondences. They were retested again two years later measuring early word reading skills. The findings concluded that there was a significant and positive correlation between narrative skills and the other emergent literacy skills tested. While this was the case, the study also concluded that emergent literacy skills had stronger correlations with each other than with narrative skills.

=== Phonological awareness ===
Phonological awareness is another component of emergent literacy. It is the ability and skills to manipulate sounds in words without the use of print. For example, manipulating and identifying sounds in words such as syllables, rhymes, and individual sounds including blending them together are phonological awareness skills . This component relates to being able to hear and play with the smaller sounds in words as well, known as phonemic awareness. Types of phonological awareness include: phonemic awareness, syllable awareness, word awareness, and sentence awareness. Students may have to identify or produce these skills when they are working with words. Many studies have shown that children who are proficient at learning to read and can read new words have developed a strong phonological awareness. Students who have difficulty with reading often have poor phonological awareness skills. If a child has strong phonological awareness skills, they will likely have less difficulty with learning to read than a child who doesn't. Phonemic awareness is under the umbrella of phonological awareness. Only the phonemes or individual sounds in words are being used. These could be letter sounds /c/ /a/ or digraph /ch/ /sh/ or even trigraphs /tch/. The amount of letters does not matter, it is the fact that only one sound is being produced. Skills in this category include identifying, blending and manipulating these phonemes or individual sounds. Phonemic awareness has been argued to be the most important aspect of phonological awareness when learning to read.

Due to its importance, many preschool, kindergarten and higher grade levels have phonological awareness programs. Specific and explicit phonological awareness instruction is the most effective way for children to learn. This is when a teacher will teach the different skills directly to the students versus incorporating them into the literacy instruction but not directly teaching them. For example, teachers can read lots of rhyming books like (Hop on Pop) but if the children are not specifically taught what rhyming is and how to rhyme they are less likely to know how to do it. However, incorporating these skills into literacy instruction on top of explicitly teaching them could reinforce the skills already taught. It is believed that phonological instruction could be taught from the larger parts of the words such as rhyming and syllables first, to the smaller parts such as the individual phonemes and then to writing them.

=== Environmental print ===
Environmental print is the words and writing we see on a daily basis. It incorporates all forms of writing that is presented to us. Examples include: logos on a T-shirt, stop signs, advertisements, labels, brand names, etc. A key feature of environmental print is that it is designed to be simple and attract a lot of attention. Due to this, children are more likely to make quick associations with the print and learn that the print represents something. For example: A child may recognize that the golden arches M of McDonalds means there is tasty food at that place. Environmental print is one of the first places where children start to understand that print can carry meaning. Children have been seen to interact with environmental print as young as two or three years old. At this age, they also start to have the ability to distinguish this print from numbers and pictures. Of the different types of environmental print (community signs, labels on household items, etc.) child-directed print is more likely to be recognized by children, particularly pre-schoolers. This print is mostly names of different toys such as Barbie, lego and crayons. Due to the abundance of environmental print, socioeconomic status does not affect a child's exposure nor understanding of it.

When a child can identify logos and environmental print due to being exposed to it, they are a logographic reader. They actually cannot read the print because they do not have the alphabetic knowledge or decoding skills. Some believe reading environment print is the start to connecting words with meaning and can be used to serve as motivation to read.

However, there is no conclusion that a child's knowledge of environmental print will have any influence over their later literacy learning. Although this is the case, the use of environmental print in the classroom to support student learning has shown greater benefits than using standard print alone in the areas of letter-sound knowledge, letter writing, and print reading. For example a teacher could have students learn the different letters in a STOP sign and then practice writing them.

=== Alphabetic knowledge ===
Alphabetic knowledge is a key component of emergent literacy. It consists of knowing, naming and writing the letters of the alphabet. It is the knowledge of all letters (uppercase and lowercase) as well as their sounds. This component relates to the understanding that letters are different from each other and recognizing letters everywhere. Generally, the order in which children learn alphabetic knowledge is: uppercase letters, lowercase letters then letter-sound correspondences. One well known start to learning alphabetic knowledge is singing the ABCs. Many kids can recite the alphabet by age 5 and it is a common practice among children. Reciting or singing the song does not mean a child can make the letter-sound connections; they may simply have a song memorized. There is no strong data that this recitation will help a child with their alphabetic knowledge or be a predictor of literacy success. Conversely, there is a connection between letter-naming, which is the ability to name a letter when it is displayed randomly and by itself, and a child's ability to read proficiently in future grades. Children that know at least 10 letters by the end of preschool are less likely to have reading difficulties later on.

When a child is learning letters, different factors can influence how easily they learn them. Letters that are very distinct such as /T/ are easier for children to learn versus letters that appear very similar such as b, d, q, and p. Children are also more likely to know letters that are used more frequently in texts such as a, t, b as opposed to X, Q, Z {{Citation needed}}. The first letters children learn are often ones found in their name as well as in the beginning of the alphabet as they are more likely going to be the first ones parents will teach to their children.

Along with letter names, the letter sounds are another key component of alphabetic skills. Children who already know their letter names learn the letter sounds more easily especially when the letters follow the acrophonic principle. This is when a letter's name starts with the letter sound. For example, the letter /b/ starts with the /b/ sound. It is important for children to connect the visual letter to its corresponding sound. Knowing the letter name and sound is shown to help children write the letter. The ability of a child to write their name correctly is a good indicator of their emergent alphabetic skills. Children who can do this task will more likely know how to write other letters, know other letter names and sounds and have better phonological awareness.

Improving alphabet learning in the classroom

It is best to teach letters using a multicomponent approach. This is where letter names, sounds, recognition, and writing are all taught together. When teaching letters, incorporating content and text where the letters are found will be beneficial. For example, if the letter /c/ has been taught, the students could highlight that letter in a poem or in a type of environmental print like a Coca-Cola label. Also, when letters are learned repeatedly and seen a number of times throughout the year, it helps with the child's memory retention of the letters.

=== Home literacy environment (HLE) ===
Home literacy environment (HLE) is the literacy that takes place in the home. This involves a variety of parent and child interactions that are related to literacy. Studies have found HLE to be a predictor of children's language and literacy skills. This is true across different languages. HLE is a combination of code-related (formal) and meaning-related (informal) interactions between the parent and the child. Code related refers to direct teaching of literacy skills, reading, spelling and more. Meaning-related activities expose children to literacy but do not teach them directly such as a read aloud. Literacy artifacts, literacy events, and information gained from literacy experience all contribute to forming emergent literacy. Literacy artifacts is the same as environmental print including the print seen all around them: cereal boxes, calendars, labels, etc. Literacy events are the interactions of the child watching an adult perform a literacy task such as a read aloud. When children grow up in an environment where these things are constantly present, children will have a large advantage over students who do not. These children can start learning the features of written language at early ages. Of the literacy interactions shared book reading is one of the most important and most effective practices. Shared book reading is positively correlated with oral language, phonological awareness, reading, spelling and IQ. As we know, literacy skills such as phonics, phonological awareness, alphabetical knowledge, and word awareness as well as other reading and writing skills are crucial for children to develop at a young age. When seeing children develop emergent literacy, these skills are entirely connected to language acquisition. In order for children, infants, and babies to begin to improve their literacy skills, they need to have language acquisition. Language acquisition is a process that starts at birth and in home literacy environments.

From a socio-pedagogical perspective, literacy development in preschool is conceptualized as a social phenomenon. A recent study investigated the complex relationships among all dimensions of parental involvement and their association with children's literacy outcomes (knowledge, skills and attitudes), while taking into account the role of several contextual factors (children's age, parental education, urbanity, number of children's books at home) in these associations. Results illustrated how parental practices mediate the effect of literacy-related parental perceptions and family–school relationships on children's literacy competences. Among the contextual factors, only maternal education was found to have a robust, albeit indirect via parental practices, effect on literacy outcomes.

== Lessons and activities ==
Emergent literacy lessons may focus on one emergent literacy skill or blend them. Below are examples of emerging literacy games and activities that each focus primarily on one emergent literacy skill.

Building vocabulary
Sorting games can help children build vocabulary skills by asking them to identify defining characteristics of the items being sorted. Special Connections, a teaching resource website provided by Kansas University, suggests a shoe sorting game in which each child takes off one of his or her shoes. The children work together to sort the shoes by different characteristics, thus building vocabulary related to color, types of fasteners (buckle, Velcro), shoe type (sandal, gym shoe), etc. This activity could work with other objects such as Legos and pasta. The full activity is available online.
The Hanen Centre outlines another strategy for teaching vocabulary to promote emergent literacy.

Letter recognition
Letter recognition games help children learn the letters of the alphabet. In one simple game, the teacher writes each letter of the alphabet on a separate notecard and passes them out to students. The students then have to arrange themselves in alphabetical order. This game is provided by Special Connections, a teaching resource website provided by the University of Kansas, and is available online.

Phonological awareness
One type of phonological awareness game involves rhyming, which helps children identify similar sounds in words. In one rhyming game, the teacher can present three different "consonant-vowel-consonant" words and ask children which word does not rhyme. For example, cat, log, and dog. The full activity and other similar rhyming activities are available online.

Other activities include songs and chants, riddles, storytelling, poetry, and integrating coinciding actions like clapping or jumping. The activities are designed to foster curiosity and encourage experimentation with language and literacy programs through mimicking play.

Print motivation
Since print motivation involves a child's interest and enjoyment of books, there are a variety of activities that parents and teachers can share with children to help promote print motivation. Examples include:

- Read often and make it enjoyable
- Read together when the adult and the child are in a good mood, so the experience is a positive one
- Change your voice when you read aloud
- Keep books accessible to children
- Stop reading when a child becomes tired or loses interest

Print motivation tips adapted from the Loudoun County Public Library.

Print awareness
Print awareness is a child's understanding of the parts of a book and how a book works. The State Library of Louisiana suggests an activity in which a child shares the parts of a book with an adult. For example, the teacher or parent could ask the child to point out different parts of the book and its contents, such as the front cover; the title; the first line of the book; a word; a letter; and the back cover.

George Mason University suggests additional family activities, such as making a book together. Parents may include familiar photographs with labels under each photo, or children may illustrate the book by themselves. Parents could write the words as the children dictate the story. Another activity suggested involves, when going out to a restaurant together, showing the menu to children and pointing to the words as they are read. This activity aims to help children understand how print is connected to real life. Additional activities can be found online.

Narrative skills
Children can build narrative skills by describing something that happened to him or her, even something as simple as taking a bath. Parents and teachers can promote narrative skills by prompting children for further detail. Other activities to promote narrative skills in both babies and toddlers are available from the Loudoun County Library.

== Models of literacy ==
Models of Literacy are ways educators, and parents teach certain literacy skills, such as reading or writing to students and children. Most children are exposed to literacy skills by means of observation and modeling from those around them. Parents and educators are examples of models of literacy that influence children's emergent literacy.

Parents

Parents can influence emergent literacy skills through informal play. In reference to learning, the definition of play is an activity a child chooses to do without force from external pressure. Some examples include: teaching letters, words, and spelling. Other informal examples include but are not limited to: learning the alphabet, singing songs, and storytelling. Parents are able to guide and challenge their child's thinking process in a way that can reformulate their concepts. Children need supportive intervention to reconstruct schemas and learn how to ask questions. For example, intervention would look like parents asking their child questions or to explain their thinking methods. Encouraging children to think abstractly at a young age would improve children's literacy skills. This could sound like

- "What if I replace the C in cat with a R, would it change the word?"
- "What if I take two marbles from the bag, how many are left?"
- "That is not a dog, it is a cat" (child might assume all furry animals are dogs, correction will create new schema)

Teachers and educators

Even in classroom settings, teachers can teach literacy skills in informal ways. In a research study done in 2013 by Jenny Miglis Sandvik, Victor HP van Daal and Herman J Adèr, the authors examined the beliefs and practices preschooler teachers believed were important to get children to start thinking critically and begin their emergent literacy skills. In the study, they found most teachers believed early literacy in preschool due to the preschool curriculum that emphasizes the importance of teaching children emergent literacy skills. The study also illustrates the practices the teacher uses. Teachers with "traditional" beliefs, "think out loud" while reading, show how they track text when reading with their finger, and demonstrate how to sound out words, while also practicing to write these words. Another study done in 2001 by Laura Klenk, she observed two preschool teachers who sought to explore how children learn through observation in playful scenarios rather than stress-inducing environments like standardized testing. While changing the environment students worked in, the teachers created work spaces that display diversity with multilingual literature. Demonstrating the results of the playful environment, the teachers encouraged parents to engage with their children the same way at home. Some activities the teachers proposed included: art free time increasing the use of writing tools, re-enacting stories from books they read as a class to record reading comprehension, and playing pretend (making grocery lists, playing office jobs, signing names).

Storytelling

Parents and siblings can promote emergent literacy in younger children. This could take form in storytelling and book reading between an older sibling and younger sibling. When reading a child a story, the story becomes interactive in ways the child listens, imitates the story or talks about the story. The child may be responding with questions or comprehending the words linguistically. Storytelling then becomes a literacy model because it allows the engagement of practicing and reinforcing new knowledge. A study done in 2023 reflects on how children who grow up in higher levels of home literacy with children who engage in that literacy tend to have a higher notational skill in preschool. This can lead to an improvement in literacy development as a child reaches primary school. According to a study done in 2019, by Eke Krijnen, Roel van Steensel, Marieke Meeuwisse, Joran Jongerling, and Sabine Severiens, the study examines and discusses how storytelling contributes to children's oral dialect and language. The study details, when engaging with children in reading activities like storytelling, or mealtime conversations, this opens up opportunities for children to use new words which later can contribute to children's oral language skills.

== Criticisms of research in emergent literacy ==
Researchers and experts in the field of emergent literacy have criticized current studies, claiming that they lack in consideration of all potential variables such as defining what writing is and more. Commonly, most emergent literacy research consists of the analyzing of "print" that children produce. However, in their critical review of emergent literacy research, experts Harmey and Wilkinson wrote how it's more important to focus on the intention and context behind such prints or other products of literacy. Commonly used approaches in this field of research, such as directly analyzing prints, are lacking in that they do not allow researchers to explore children's understandings about writing through specifically tailored experiments. Most research in the field tends to exclude the consideration of other factors like idea generation and intention behind the print. The method of which current research is being done does not give substantial reasoning behind how such literacy development occurs. An example of consideration of other elements can be seen in a study conducted in which Israeli and Dutch mothers were asked to analyze whether their children's "prints" were writing or drawing, to consider the intent behind the "prints" the children produced.

A better approach to research would be to utilize assessments that also emphasize other measures of writing such as procedural tasks so that prints made under the context of different purposes can be compared. Currently, no features of measurement exist to describe various features of writing at once for a variety of ages. It is important to identify gaps in current research and propose solutions because findings from emergent literacy studies can be implemented as real world practices that can improve writing development in children.

== Bilingual emergent literacy ==
This new term called dynamic bilingualism refers to the practice of multilingual interactions that occur on a daily basis in a cultural context. It is how people who speak different languages make meaning and methods of communication. In literacy, it is common for these groups of people, those who are not monolingual in English, are excluded and left unsupported. Emergent bilingualism becomes a literacy issue when marginalized groups are not presented the same opportunities as English monolingual learners in education. There is a need for diversity in classrooms, especially since literacy and obtaining an education was inaccessible to marginalized groups throughout history. The goal is not solely to teach students English, it is to encourage students to use their linguistic skills and developing their bilingual identities. Students can use bilingualism in literacy as their strength to attract different groups into one audience, as well as analyze using translingual styles from different cultures. The system of education that supports standardized, mono-glossic language fails to include bilingual students to an extent, and this can have lasting impacts on what identities get forgotten.

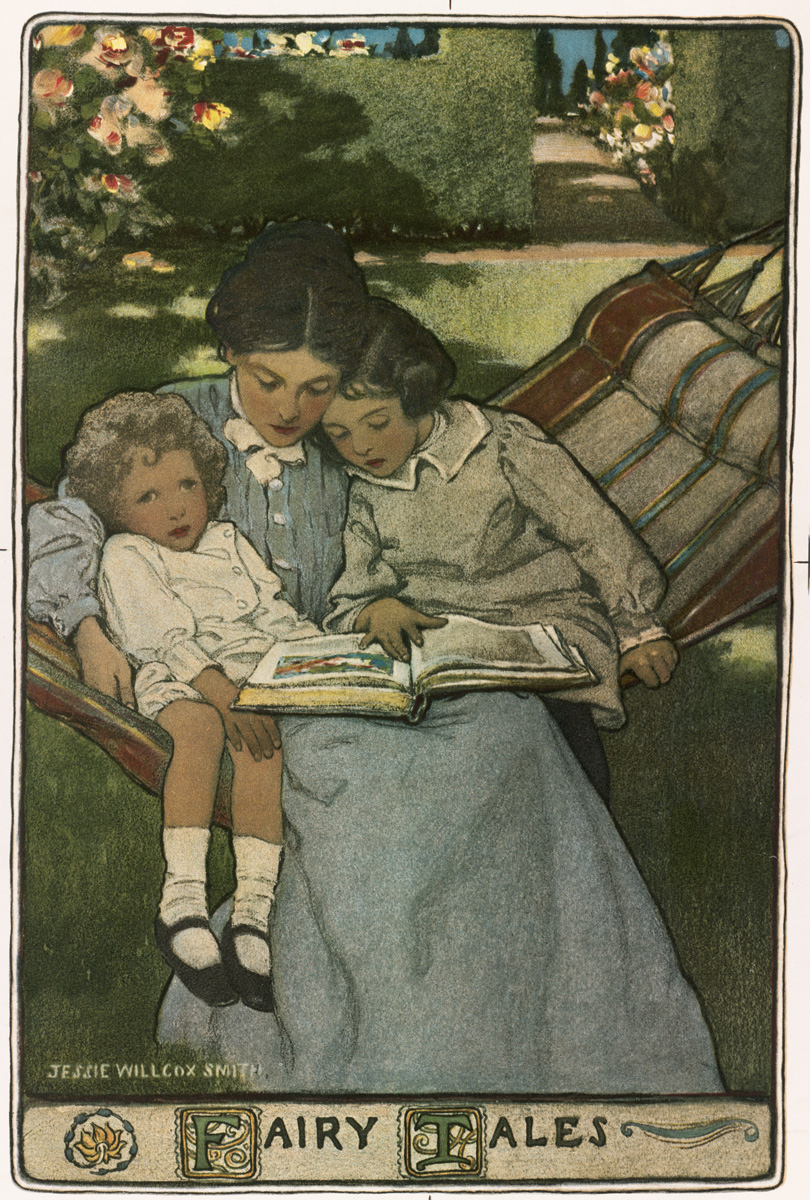
Caregiver reading to Children

== Infant emergent literacy ==
Emergent literacy may begin as early as infancy when infants are exposed to books and sound. Parents who read more often to their infants and engage in interactive storytelling contribute to the development of their child's ability to correlate images with sounds and foster their communicative and language development. The correlation between books designed for infants, which tend to have more illustrations than words, allow for infants to begin expanding their vocabulary with sounds they associate and begin to repeat and learn. An infant may begin to repeat phrases read to them or sounds used to describe images in the books they are being read. Infants being exposed to such environments where they are able to hear various sounds and words allows them to learn and grow more of their vocabulary than normal 'baby talk'. The exposure and simulation to an infant's mind also allows for the recognition of various daily items, brands, pictures, and content shown to them due to these language and visual exposures.

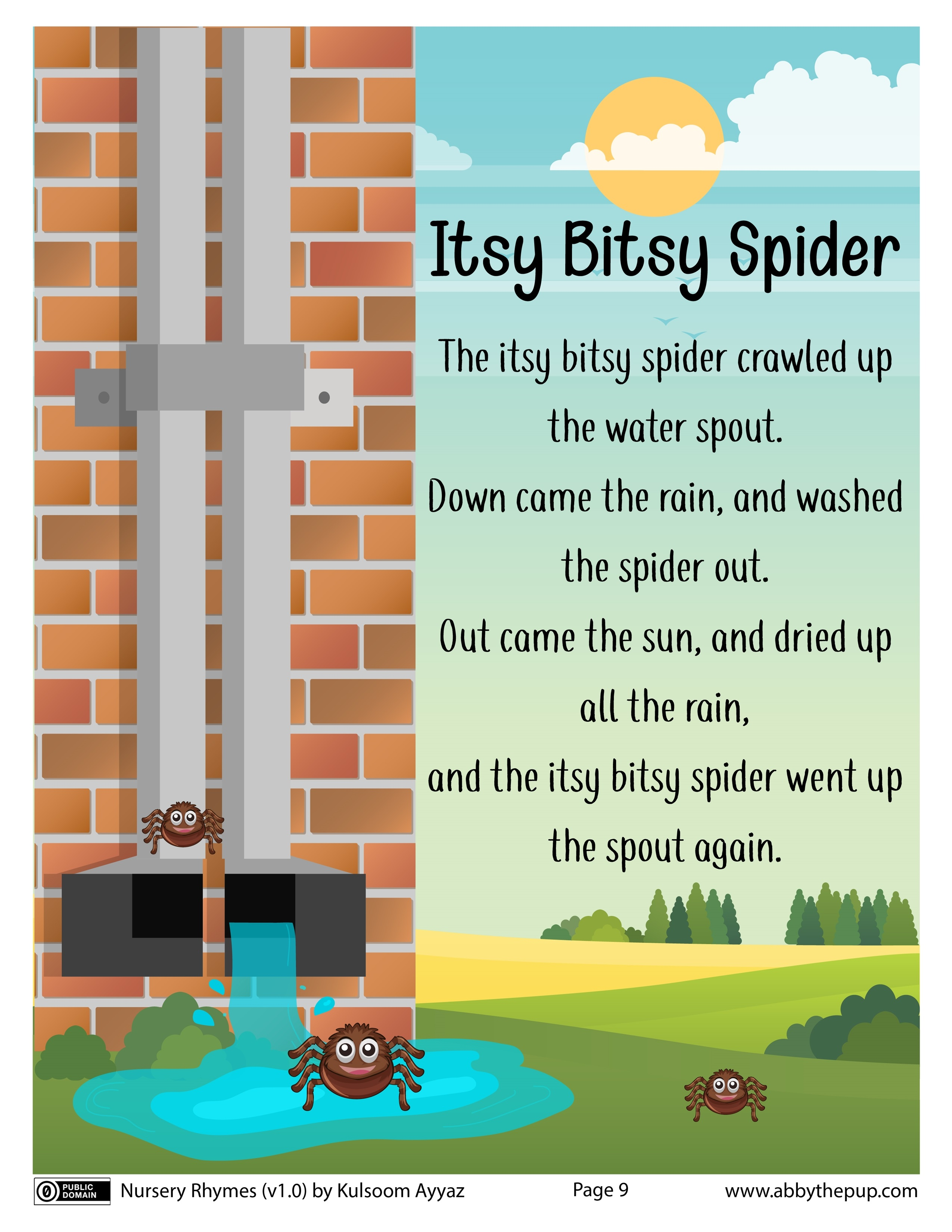
'Itsy Bitsy Spider' - song incorporated in storytelling

== Music in infant/toddler emergent literacy ==
Emergency literacy in both infants and toddlers will rely more on sounds and recognition than actual reading and writing as words and their structures are not fully developed by both age groups. The addition of music and song into an infant/toddler's storytelling allows for their own language skills to further develop by being able to recognize and repeat songs sung by their caregivers. When melodies are accompanied with books recognition of said melody will allow the infant/toddler to identify that specific book with what is being heard by them. They may be able to then repeat phrases in a song indicating their understanding of what is being sung from the book to them. Using music allows for a more interactive learning environment where infants and toddlers can associate these melodies and tunes to familiar everyday children's stories to build their vocabulary and understanding of everyday functions.

== Adult emergent biliteracy ==
Emergent literacy does not just occur in childhood. It can occur in adulthood, and it is very common among second-language students, also referred to as L2 writers. Many L2 writers lack certain literacy skills due to informal primary education whether it be a result of war, cultural customs, social class, or civil conflict. Different types of literacy is harder to develop in adulthood, like print literacy. This can be due to the fact that adult learners have to learn both grapheme-phoneme correspondences as well as an entire lexicon in a new language. Adults do have higher print awareness, but it is also difficult for the teachers to carry out instructions. A struggle L2 teachers see among their students is the inability to transition from classroom activities and apply those skills into individual writing. Researching L2 writers and their experiences creates a conflicting ethical question: how do we research these groups? But this issue in question brings attention to needed research that encourages diversity and inclusion in adult emergent literacy.

== Emergent literacy in atypical students ==
An explanatory study was conducted to explore the emergent literacy skills within Spanish speaking children with developmental language disorder (DLD). Developmental Language Disorder is defined by ones inability or struggle with language comprehension skills that is not related to factors like genetics, autism, or brain injuries. Compared to the typically developed control group of children, code-related literacy skills were weaker among those in the DLD group. The results of this study propose the theory that there is a universal experience for those with developmental disorders and reading development, with no regards to the language they speak. Those with DLD often have difficulties with production of oral speech as well as written language. Additional cross-linguistic research is needed to explore whether early struggles really allude to reading disabilities in adulthood, but the study shows representation in research for children who are not deemed "typical" and it shows that emergent literacy looks different in every child.

== See also ==
- Children's Literature
- Literacy
- Reading (process)
