= The Analysis of Verbal Behavior =

Psychology journal

The Analysis of Verbal Behavior (TAVB) is a peer reviewed, scientific journal established in 1982, which primarily publishes research in the field of psychology focused on the conceptual and empirical analysis of verbal behavior.

== History ==
The Analysis of Verbal Behavior was created by Mark Sundberg, and was originally a newsletter called VB Newsletters. After Sundberg completed his PhD at Western Michigan University in 1980, he began publishing TVAB under its current name in 1982.

No new articles or editions of the journal were published during the year of 1984.

The current editor-in-chief, as of 2023, is Tiffany M Kodak, PhD, from Marquette University. Notable former editors include Anna I Pétursdóttir, PhD, from Texas Christian University. Notable authors published in TVAB include B. F. Skinner and Jack Michael.

== Publication ==
[...] even though one may be able to do good works without talking about it correctly, I can't help but believe that even better works are possible when verbal practices are not seriously flawed.

— Jack Michael

The Analysis of Verbal Behavior is indexed in PsycINFO and published annually by the Association for Behavior Analysis International (ABAI) under ISSN 08889-9401. It is a delayed open-access journal with free access offered by the ABAI.

TAVB typically publishes between 10 and 20 articles per year. Between 1982 and 2000, the journal published over 150 articles covering various language and behavioral functions such as mand, tact, intraverbals, listener behavior, rule-governed behavior, autoclitics, epistemology, language acquisition and assessment, second languages, pedagogy, verbal behavior in nonhumans, research methodology, and the history of verbal behavior analysis.
