= Jack Michael =

American psychologist and professor (1926–2020)

Jack Michael (January 16, 1926 – November 12, 2020) was an American psychologist and professor at Western Michigan University. He developed one of the first token economies, the concept of motivating operations (MOs), and is a pioneer of what is now referred to as applied behavior analysis (ABA, also called behavioral engineering).

== Early life ==
Michael, named John Lester Michael, was born on January 16, 1926, in Los Angeles, California. He had no siblings. His father Lester Lioniel was an automobile mechanic and his mother Willie did not work outside of the home. He lived in a lower-middle-class neighborhood near downtown L.A. from the time he was 5 years old until he was drafted into the army at 18.

As a youth, he joined an inner city Hispanic gang but avoided fights, protected by members who needed his help with their own schoolwork. He developed an early love of reading, accompanying his mother to the library on Saturdays.

He attended elementary school from 1931 to 1937, Junior High School from 1938 to 1940, and High School from 1941 to 1943. He was in the Boy Scouts for about 3 years, took drum lessons, and played in a youth orchestra/marching band.

== Career ==
Michael entered UCLA as a chemistry major in Fall 1943, completed one semester, then was drafted into the army in June 1944 (in the middle of his second semester). Although he was a very good student in high school, he was an average student at UCLA, earning a C-average his first year.

He received a PhD in psychology from UCLA in 1955. He taught at the University of Kansas from 1955 to 1957 and became influenced by B. F. Skinner's work on behavior. He moved to the University of Houston in 1957 and Arizona State University in 1960. He was professor emeritus of psychology at Western Michigan University. He began teaching at WMU in 1967 and retired from the university in 2003.

Michael was awarded the Distinguished Contributions to Education in Psychology Award of the American Psychological Society in 1971. The citation reads "To Jack L. Michael—innovator and disseminator of instructional technology. Many have been influenced by his complete dedication to students and the improvement of teaching.

He was married to Alyce Dickinson, professor emerita at Western Michigan University.

=== Publications ===
Michael has published over 70 articles and 1 book, Concepts and Principles of Behavior Analysis. While at Houston, he and his colleague Teodoro Ayllon conducted the study The psychiatric nurse as a behavioral engineer. A token economy was employed for hospitalized patients with schizophrenia and intellectual disability. This helped to set what was then known as behavior modification in motion, and in turn, led to the establishment of the discipline of applied behavior analysis when researchers at the University of Kansas started the Journal of Applied Behavior Analysis (JABA) in 1968.

He was also the past editor of The Analysis of Verbal Behavior (TAVB), which publishes theoretical and experimental work related to extensions of Skinner's analysis of Verbal Behavior.
