= Hanen =

Hanen is a surname. It may refer to:

== People ==
- Andrew Hanen (born 1953), American judge
- Marsha Hanen (1938–2019), Canadian academic and university administrator
- Nora Hanen, character in the soap opera One Life to Live

== Other uses ==
- The Hanen Centre non-profit Canadian centre to promote child's speech and social skills development
