= Autoclitic =

Autoclitics are verbal responses that modify the effect on the listener of the primary operants that comprise B.F. Skinner's classification of Verbal Behavior.

== Autoclitics ==
An autoclitic is a verbal behavior that modifies the functions of other verbal behaviors. For example, "I think it is raining" possesses the autoclitic "I think," which moderates the strength of the statement "it is raining." Research that involves autoclitics includes Lodhi & Greer (1989).

=== Descriptive autoclitics ===
A speaker may acquire verbal behaviour that describes their own behaviour. "I said Noam C. Hayes is wrong" is a descriptive autoclitic that describes the behaviour of talking about one's own behaviour. They may also describe strength of response, as the emission of "I think" is often used to indicate some level of weakness, as in "Noam Chomsky is smart, I think." Descriptive autoclitics modify the listener's reaction by specifying something about the circumstances of the emission of a response or the condition of the speaker providing the verbal response. For example, the "I guess" in "I guess he is here" describes strength of the statement "he is here." It does so because "I guess" specifies that the speaker is not sure he is here, just guessing, thus showing weakness in the strength of the response "he is here." In describing something about a response, descriptive autoclitics specify some condition of a response, such as "I said" in "I said 'Hello.'" The "I said" describes the condition under which "Hello" was said. Descriptive autoclitics can include information regarding the type of verbal operant it accompanies, the strength of the verbal response, the relation between responses, or the emotional or motivation conditions of the speaker. In addition, negative autoclitics quantify or cancel the responses they accompany. For example, the not in "it is not raining" cancels the response "it is raining." Descriptive autoclitics can also just indicate a response is being omitted, or that the omitted response is subordinate in relation to what has been said, e.g., "for example." Qualifying autoclitics modify the listener's behaviour in their qualification of tacts in its intensity or direction. Negation is a common qualifying autoclitic, as in "it is not raining", the not qualifies it is raining. Without the not, the listener's behaviour would be inappropriate. "No!" also serves to cancel a response, while "Yes!" encourages a response, as qualifying autoclitics can serve to assert a response.

Quantifying autoclitics modify the reaction of the listener, in that all, some, and no affect the responses they accompany. A and the narrow a listener in on the response that follows and its relation to the controlling stimulus. For example, circumstances under which we say "book" vary from those where we say "the book," with the functioning to modify the listener's reaction. Relational autoclitics are different from descriptive autoclitics in that they affect the behavior of the listener. For example, above in "the book is above the shelf" tells the listener where to find the book, thereby altering where the listener looks for the book. Another way to look at relational autoclitics is that they describe the relation between verbal operants, and modify the listener's behavior in that way. For example, in the statement "the book is black" the is tells the listener there is a relation between book and black, is specifies what is black.

=== Grammar and syntax as autoclitic processes ===
Skinner describes grammatical manipulations, such as the order or grouping of responses, as autoclitic. The ordering of patterns may be a function of relevant strength, temporal ordering, or other factors. Skinner speaks to the use of predication and the use of tags, contrasting the Latin forms, which use tags—and English, which uses grouping and ordering. Skinner proposes the relational autoclitic as a descriptor for these kinds of relationships.

=== Composition and its effect ===
Composition represents a special class of autoclitic responding, because the responding is itself a response to previously existing verbal responses. The autoclitic is controlled not only by the effects on the listener but upon the speaker as listener of their own responses. Skinner notes that "emotional and imaginal" behavior has little to do with grammar and syntax. Obscene words and poetry are likely to be effective, even when emitted non-grammatically.

=== Self-editing ===
Self-editing as a compositional process follows the autoclitic process of manipulating responses. After the responses are changed with autoclitics they are examined for their effects and then "rejected or released." Conditions may prevent self-editing, such as a very high response strength.

=== Rejection ===
The physical topography of the rejection of verbal behavior in the process of editing varies from the partial emission of a written word to the apparent non-emission of a vocal response. It may include ensuring that responses simply do not reach a listener, as in not delivering a manuscript or letter. Manipulative autoclitics can revoke words by striking them out, as in a court of law. Similar effects may arise from expression like "Forget it."

=== Defective feedback ===
A speaker may fail to react as a listener to their own speech under conditions where the emission of verbal responses is very quick. The speed may be a function of strength or of differential reinforcement. Physical interruption may arise as in the case of those who are hearing impaired, or under conditions of mechanical impairment such as ambient noise. Skinner argues the Ouija board may operate to mask feedback and so produce unedited verbal behavior.
