= Tact (psychology) =

Psychological term

Tact is a term that B.F. Skinner used to describe a verbal operant which is controlled by a nonverbal stimulus (such as an object, event, or property of an object) and is maintained by nonspecific social reinforcement (praise).

Less technically, a tact is a label. For example, a child may see their pet dog and say "dog"; the nonverbal stimulus (dog) evoked the response "dog" which is maintained by praise (or generalized conditioned reinforcement) "you're right, that is a dog!"

Chapter five of Skinner's Verbal Behavior discusses the tact in depth. A tact is said to "make contact with" the world, and refers to behavior that is under the control of generalized reinforcement. The controlling antecedent stimulus is nonverbal, and constitutes some portion of "the whole of the physical environment."

The tact described by Skinner includes three important and related events, known as the 3-term-contingency: a stimulus, a response, and a consequence, in this case reinforcement. A verbal response is occasioned by the presence of a stimulus, such as when you say "ball" in the presence of a ball. In this scenario, "ball" is more likely to be reinforced by the listener than saying "cat", showing the importance of the third event, reinforcement, in relation to the stimulus (ball) and response ("ball"). Although the stimulus controls the response, it is the verbal community which establishes the stimulus' control over the verbal response of the speaker. For example, a child may say "ball" in the presence of a ball (stimulus), the child's parent may respond "yes, that is a ball", (reinforcement) thereby increasing the probability that the child will say ball in the presence of a ball in the future. On the other hand, if the parent never responds to the child saying "ball" in the presence of a ball then the probability of that response will decrease in the future.

A tact may be pure or impure. For example, if the environmental stimulus evokes the response, the tact would be considered pure. If the tact is evoked by a verbal stimulus the resulting tact would be considered impure. For example, if a child is shown a picture of a dog, and emits the response "dog" this would be an example of a pure tact. If a child is shown a picture of a dog, and is given the verbal instruction "what is this?" then the response "dog" would be considered an impure tact.

The tact can be extended, as in generic, metaphorical, metonymical, solecistic, nomination, and "guessing" tact. It can also be involved in abstraction. Lowe, Horne, Harris & Randle (2002) would be one example of recent work in tacts.

== Extensions ==
The tact is said to be capable of generic extension. Generic extension is essentially an example of stimulus generalization. The novel stimulus contains all of the relevant features of the original stimulus. For example, we may see a red car and say "car" as well as see a white car and say "car". Different makes and models of cars will all evoke the same response "car".

Tacts can be extended metaphorically; in this case the novel stimulus has only some of the defining features of the original stimulus. For example, when we describe something as "exploding with taste" by drawing the common property of an explosion with the response to our having eaten something (perhaps a strong response, or a sudden one).

Tacts can undergo metonymical extension when some irrelevant but related feature of the original stimulus controls a response. In metonymical extension, one word often replaces another; we may replace a part for a whole. For example, saying "refrigerator" when shown a picture of a kitchen, or saying "White house" in place of "President."

When controlling variables unrelated to standard or immediate reinforcement take over control of the tact, it is said to be solecistically extended. Malapropisms, solecism and catachresis are examples of this.

Skinner notes things like serial order, or conspicuous features of an object, may come to play as nominative tacts. A proper name may arise as a result of the tact. For example, a house that is haunted becomes "The Haunted House" as a nominative extension to the tact of its being haunted.

A guess may seemingly be the emission of a response in the absence of controlling stimuli. Skinner notes that this may simply be a tact under more subtle or hidden controlling variables, although this is not always the case in something like guessing the landing side of a coin toss, where the possible alternatives are fixed and there is no subtle or hidden stimuli to control responses.

== Special conditions affecting stimulus control ==
Skinner deals with factors that interfere with, or change, generalized reinforcement. It is these conditions which, in turn, affect verbal behavior which may depend largely or entirely on generalized reinforcement. In children with developmental disabilities, tacts may need intensive training procedures to develop. Factors such as deprivation, emotional conditions and personal history may interfere with or change verbal behavior. Skinner mentions alertness, irrelevant emotional variables, "special circumstances" surrounding particular listeners or speakers, etc. (He refers to the conditions which are said to produce objective and subjective responses for example). We would now look at these as motivating operations/establishing conditions.

Under emersion conditions tacts will frequently emerge. However, in children with disabilities, more intensive training procedures are often needed.

== Distortion ==
Distorted stimulus control may be minor as when a description (tact) is a slight exaggeration. Under stronger conditions of distortion, it may appear when the original stimulus is absent, as in the case of the response called a lie. Skinner notes that troubadours and fiction writers are perhaps both motivated by similar forms of tact distortion. Initially, they may recount real events, but as differential reinforcement affects the account we may see distortion and then total fabrication.

== Tact training ==
Often, individuals with autism, developmental disabilities, or language delays have difficulty acquiring novel tacts. Many researchers in the field of verbal behavior and developmental disabilities have examined more intensive training procedures in order to teach tacts to these individuals. Specific types of prompts can be used in order to make a tact response more likely. For example, asking the student the question "what is this?" (this would be an example of an impure tact) has been used to prompt a correct tact response (this prompt can be faded until the learner can emit a pure tact). Echoic prompts (teacher repeats the correct answer which the learner must echo) have also been used to train tact responses. Kodak and Clements (2009) found that echoic training sessions before tact training was more effective at increasing independent tact responses.

Skinner (1957) suggested that verbal operants were functionally independent, meaning that after teaching one verbal operant the individual may not be able to emit the topographically same response under different stimulus conditions. For example, a child may be able to request water, but may not be able to tact water. Researchers are currently examining procedures that may facilitate the generalization across verbal operants. Some studies have indicated, for example, that after teaching a child to mand for items, they could then tact them as well without direct instruction. Multiple studies have found support for the emergence of tact responses without direct instruction. These teaching procedures are especially important for individuals with autism and developmental disabilities because the learner can gain additional skills without direct instruction time.

== See also ==
Mand (psychology)
