= The Hanen Centre =

Canadian non-profit organization

- Formation: 1975
- Founders: Ayala Hanen Manolson
- Type: Not-for-profit organization
- Legal status: Charitable organization
- Purpose: Providing language intervention for children
- Headquarters: Toronto, Canada
- Region served: Worldwide (primarily North America, U.K., Australia)
- Services: Parent and caregiver training programs, workshops, resources
- Official language: English (with translations available)
- Key people: Ayala Hanen Manolson (Founder)
- Website: www.hanen.org

The Hanen Centre is a not-for-profit registered charitable organization, based in Toronto, Canada. It defines its mission as, “providing the important people in a child’s life with the knowledge and training they need to help the child develop the best possible language, social and literacy skills”.

== Overview ==
The organization’s primary focus is on developing and disseminating parent and caregiver training programs to provide early language intervention for children with language delays. The organization creates and distributes resources such as guidebooks and DVDs for parents, caregivers and professionals, as well as offering workshops worldwide for Speech-Language Pathologists on the implementation of this approach to early language intervention. The Hanen Centre was founded in 1975 by Ayala Hanen Manolson, a Speech-Language Pathologist based in Montreal, Canada. Following the successful implementation of Manolson’s parent-oriented pilot program, It Takes Two To Talk, The Hanen Centre was awarded funding by the Ontario government to offer these programs to families in Toronto. The Hanen Centre’s programs are strongly based on the social interactionist model of language acquisition, and heavily emphasize a family-centered approach to language intervention. Ongoing research is conducted on Hanen Programs in collaboration with the Graduate Department of Speech-Language Pathology at the University of Toronto.

== Operations ==
The Hanen Centre currently operates six programs designed for a variety of language and communicative disorders, along with numerous workshops and supporting resources. Programs are designed for children who have, or are at risk for language delays, as well as those children who are developing normally. Specific programs and resources have also been designed for children with autism spectrum disorder (ASD). Hanen programs for parents are administered by Speech-Language Pathologists who, upon successful completion of a training workshop, are certified to offer a particular Hanen program to families in their respective communities. Both Speech-Language Pathologists and Early Childhood Educators are eligible to become trainers of child care providers and preschool teachers, with a view to training these providers to create enriched language learning environments for the children in their care. By employing an operational strategy in which professionals are trained in the administration of these programs and subsequently go on to provide this service locally, Hanen has created a large network of Speech-Language Pathologists – all of whom are licensed by the Hanen Centre. Currently, Hanen programs operate primarily in North America, the U.K and Australia, with limited operations outside those regions.

Aside from their programs, Hanen designs and distributes research-based resources to practicing Speech-Language Pathologists, Early Childhood Educators, Parents, Medical Professionals, Daycares, Nursery Schools and numerous other organizations and professionals who frequently work with young children. Such resources include books, DVDs and a variety of other supporting resources. While primarily published in English, Hanen resources have been translated into French, Spanish, Cantonese and Dutch, and have also been adapted for Native American/First Nations communities.

== Philosophy ==
Hanen programs are largely based on the social interactionist model of language acquisition and, as such, emphasize an interactive approach to language intervention. Numerous studies in the field of language acquisition and communicative disorders have suggested that children learn best from their parents, in a naturalistic and familiar environment. As a result, Hanen programs instruct parents to be effective language facilitators, making use of everyday situations to encourage emergent literacy and language development in young children, rather than confining language intervention to clinical sessions. As such, the child is provided with an enriched language learning environment which constantly engages them, and provides the child with multiple opportunities to hear and learn language. Given this approach, language and literacy intervention take place constantly, while simultaneously strengthening the bond between parent and child.
