= Print awareness =

Print awareness refers to a child's understanding of the nature and uses of print. A child's print awareness is closely associated with his or her word awareness or the ability to recognize words as distinct elements of oral and written communication. Both skills are acquired in the child's natural environment.

== Measurement ==
Print awareness is a multi-faceted skill that is difficult to isolate and define. The most effective measures analyze the child's knowledge of letters, print symbols, and reading conventions. To analyze book reading conventions the child is asked to identify the front of the book, identify which page is read first (the left page or the right page). This type of evaluation produces considerable variation among preschoolers (Justice and Ezell, 2001).

== Significance ==
Along with phonological awareness, print awareness is a strong determinant of early reading achievement (Adams, 1990). Print awareness is included in the preliteracy skills that children entering first grade are expected to have mastered. The first-grade curriculum is designed around this assumption. Children who have low levels of print awareness are likely to fall behind.

Children who come from print-rich homes where they are constantly exposed to adult models are more likely to develop print awareness than their peers. Since print awareness emerges naturally, the influence of the home environment is significant. A number of characteristics of the home environment can be altered to enhance a child's print awareness.

== Interventions ==
Since print awareness has been identified as an important precursor to literacy, numerous interventions have been designed to enhance the print awareness and preliteracy skills of at-risk children. Many of them focus on storybook reading or joint-book reading. This is a common practice in print-rich homes and some simple alterations of daily routines can have a huge impact on the child's preliteracy skills.

Storybook reading can improve a child's print awareness when the parent (or other adult such as a teacher) uses a technique referred to as print referencing. Print referencing occurs when verbal or non-verbal cues are used to encourage a child's attention or interaction with print. An example of this is a parent asking the child to point to the first word on a page or to ask "Where are the words on this page?"

== See also ==
- joint-book reading
- Preliteracy
