= Verbal Behavior =

Psychology book

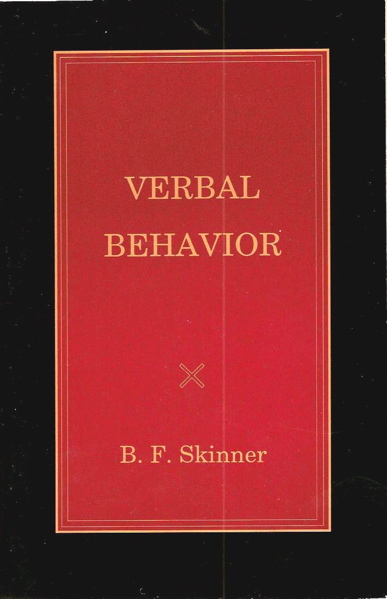
- Author: B. F. Skinner
- Language: English
- Subject: Human Language, Communication, Speech, Linguistics
- Publisher: Copley Publishing Group
- Publication date: 1957, 1992
- Publication place: United States
- Pages: 478
- ISBN: 1-58390-021-7 (case), ISBN 0-87411-591-4 (pbk.)
- OCLC: 251221179

Verbal Behavior is a 1957 book by psychologist B. F. Skinner, in which he describes what he calls verbal behavior, or what was traditionally called linguistics. Skinner's work describes the controlling elements of verbal behavior with terminology invented for the analysis - echoics, mands, tacts, autoclitics and others - as well as carefully defined uses of ordinary terms such as audience.

== Origins ==
The origin of Verbal Behavior was an outgrowth of a series of lectures first presented at the University of Minnesota in the early 1940s and developed further in his summer lectures at Columbia and William James lectures at Harvard in the decade before the book's publication.

== Research ==
Skinner's analysis of verbal behavior drew heavily on methods of literary analysis. This tradition has continued. The book Verbal Behavior is almost entirely theoretical, involving little experimental research in the work itself. Many research papers and applied extensions based on Verbal Behavior have been done since its publication.

== Functional analysis ==
Skinner's Verbal Behavior also introduced the autoclitic and six elementary operants: mand, tact, audience relation, echoic, textual, and intraverbal. For Skinner, the proper object of study is behavior itself, analyzed without reference to hypothetical (mental) structures, but rather with reference to the functional relationships of the behavior in the environment in which it occurs. This analysis extends Ernst Mach's pragmatic inductive position in physics, and extends even further a disinclination towards hypothesis-making and testing. Verbal Behavior is divided into 5 parts with 19 chapters. The first chapter sets the stage for this work, a functional analysis of verbal behavior. Skinner presents verbal behavior as a function of controlling consequences and stimuli, not as the product of a special inherent capacity. Neither does he ask us to be satisfied with simply describing the structure, or patterns, of behavior. Skinner deals with some alternative, traditional formulations, and moves on to his own functional position.

== General problems ==
In the ascertaining of the strength of a response Skinner suggests some criteria for strength (probability): emission, energy-level, speed, and repetition. He notes that these are all very limited means for inferring the strength of a response as they do not always vary together and they may come under the control of other factors. Emission is a yes/no measure, however the other three—energy-level, speed, repetition—comprise possible indications of relative strength.

- Emission – If a response is emitted it may tend to be interpreted as having some strength. Unusual or difficult conditions would tend to lend evidence to the inference of strength. Under typical conditions it becomes a less compelling basis for inferring strength. This is an inference that is either there or not, and has no gradation of value.
- Energy-level – Unlike emission as a basis for inference, energy-level (response magnitude) provides a basis for inferring the response has a strength with a high range of varying strength. Energy level is a basis from which we can infer a high tendency to respond. An energetic and strong "Water!" forms the basis for inferring the strength of the response as opposed to a weak, brief "Water".
- Speed – Speed is the speed of the response itself, or the latency from the time in which it could have occurred to the time in which it occurs. A response given quickly when prompted forms the basis for inferring a high strength.
- Repetition – "Water! Water! Water!" may be emitted and used as an indication of relative strength compared to the speedy and/or energetic emission of "Water!". In this way repetition can be used as a way to infer strength.

== Mands ==
Chapter Three of Skinner's work Verbal Behavior discusses a functional relationship called the mand. Mand is verbal behavior under functional control of satiation or deprivation (that is, motivating operations) followed by characteristic reinforcement often specified by the response. A mand is typically a demand, command, or request. The mand is often said to "describe its own reinforcer" although this is not always the case, especially as Skinner's definition of verbal behavior does not require that mands be vocal. A loud knock at the door, may be a mand "open the door" and a servant may be called by a hand clap as much as a child might "ask for milk".

Lamarre & Holland (1985) study on mands demonstrated the role of motivating operations. The authors contrived motivating operations for objects by training behavior chains that could not be completed without certain objects. The participants learned to mand for these missing objects, which they had previously only been able to tact...

== Behavior under the control of verbal stimuli ==
=== Textual ===
In Chapter Four Skinner notes forms of control by verbal stimuli. One form is textual behavior which refers to the type of behavior we might typically call reading or writing. A vocal response is controlled by a verbal stimulus that is not heard. There are two different modalities involved ("reading"). If they are the same they become "copying text" (see Jack Michael on copying text), if they are heard, then written, it becomes "taking dictation", and so on.

=== Echoic ===
Skinner was one of the first to seriously consider the role of imitation in language learning. He introduced this concept into his book Verbal Behavior with the concept of the echoic. It is a behavior under the functional control of a verbal stimulus. The verbal response and the verbal stimulus share what is called point to point correspondence (a formal similarity.) The speaker repeats what is said. In echoic behavior, the stimulus is auditory and response is vocal. It is often seen in early shaping behavior. For example, in learning a new language, a teacher might say "parsimonious" and then say "can you say it?" to induce an echoic response. Winokur (1978) is one example of research about echoic relations.

== Tacts ==
Chapter Five of Verbal Behavior discusses the tact in depth. A tact is said to "make contact with" the world, and refers to behavior that is under functional control of a non-verbal stimulus and generalized conditioned reinforcement. The controlling stimulus is nonverbal, "the whole of the physical environment". In linguistic terms, the tact might be regarded as "expressive labelling". Tact is the most useful form of verbal behaviour to other listeners, as it extends the listeners contact with the environment. In contrast, the tact is the most useful form of verbal behaviour to the speaker as it allows to contact tangible reinforcement. Tacts can undergo many extensions: generic, metaphoric, metonymical, solecistic, nomination, and "guessing". It can also be involved in abstraction. Lowe, Horne, Harris & Randle (2002) would be one example of recent work in tacts.

== Intraverbal ==
Intraverbals are verbal behavior under the control of other verbal behavior. Intraverbals are often studied by the use of classic association techniques.

== Audiences ==
Audience control is developed through long histories of reinforcement and punishment. Skinner's three-term contingency can be used to analyze how this works: the first term, the antecedent, refers to the audience, in whose presence the verbal response (the second term) occurs. The consequences of the response are the third term, and whether or not those consequences strengthen or weaken the response will affect whether that response will occur again in the presence of that audience. Through this process, audience control, or the probability that certain responses will occur in the presence of certain audiences, develops. Skinner notes that while audience control is developed due to histories with certain audiences, we do not have to have a long history with every listener in order to effectively engage in verbal behavior in their presence (p. 176). We can respond to new audiences (new stimuli) as we would to similar audiences with whom we have a history.

=== Negative audiences ===
An audience that has punished certain kinds of verbal behavior is called a negative audience (p. 178): in the presence of this audience, the punished verbal behavior is less likely to occur. Skinner gives examples of adults punishing certain verbal behavior of children, and a king punishing the verbal behavior of his subjects.

== Summary of verbal operants ==
The following table summarizes the new verbal operants in the analysis of verbal behavior.

Precondition	Verbal Operant	Consequence	Example
Motivating Operation	Mand	Directly Effective	A child comes into the kitchen where a mother is, and says: "I want milk". The mother opens the refrigerator and gives the child milk.
Feature of the physical environment	Tact	Social	A child looks out of the window, turns to his mother and says: "It is hot today." The mother says, "Right!"
Verbal behavior of another person	Intraverbal	Social	A mother asks her daughter: "What grade did you get in math?" The daughter replies, "An A." The mother says: "Very good!"
Verbal behavior of another person	Echoic	Social	A teacher says to a student: "Behavior in German is Verhalten." The student repeats "Behavior is Verhalten." The teacher says "Correct."
A person's own verbal behavior	Autoclitic	Directly Effective	A child comes into his parents' bedroom at night and says "I think I am sick." The mother takes the child and brings him to a hospital.

== Verbal operants as a unit of analysis ==
Skinner notes his categories of verbal behavior: mand, textual, intraverbal, tact, audience relations, and notes how behavior might be classified. He notes that form alone is not sufficient (he uses the example of "fire!" having multiple possible relationships depending on the circumstances). Classification depends on knowing the circumstances under which the behavior is emitted. Skinner then notes that the "same response" may be emitted under different operant conditions. Skinner states:

"Classification is not an end in itself. Even though any instance of verbal behavior can be shown to be a function of variables in one or more of these classes, there are other aspects to be treated. Such a formulation permits us to apply to verbal behavior concepts and laws which emerge from a more general analysis" (p. 187).

That is, classification alone does little to further the analysis—the functional relations controlling the operants outlined must be analyzed consistent with the general approach of a scientific analysis of behavior.

== Multiple causation ==
Skinner notes in this chapter how any given response is likely to be the result of multiple variables. Secondly, that any given variable usually affects multiple responses. The issue of multiple audiences is also addressed, as each audience is, as already noted, an occasion for strong and successful responding. Combining audiences produces differing tendencies to respond.

== Supplementary stimulation ==
Supplementary stimulation is a discussion to practical matters of controlling verbal behavior given the context of material which has been presented thus far. Issues of multiple control, and involving many of the elementary operants stated in previous chapters are discussed.

== New combinations of fragmentary responses ==
A special case of where multiple causation comes into play creating new verbal forms is in what Skinner describes as fragmentary responses. Such combinations are typically vocal, although this may be due to different conditions of self-editing rather than any special property. Such mutations may be "nonsense" and may not further the verbal interchange in which it occurs. Freudian slips may be one special case of fragmentary responses which tend to be given reinforcement and may discourage self-editing. This phenomenon appears to be more common in children, and in adults learning a second language. Fatigue, illness and insobriety may tend to produce fragmentary responding.

== Autoclitics ==
An autoclitic is a form of verbal behavior which modifies the functions of other forms of verbal behavior. For example, "I think it is raining" possesses the autoclitic "I think" which moderates the strength of the statement "it is raining". An example of research that involved autoclitics would be Lodhi & Greer (1989).

== Self-strengthening ==
Here Skinner draws a parallel to his position on self-control and notes: "A person controls his own behavior, verbal or otherwise, as he controls the behavior of others." Appropriate verbal behavior may be weak, as in forgetting a name, and in need of strengthening. It may have been inadequately learned, as in a foreign language. Repeating a formula, reciting a poem, and so on. The techniques are manipulating stimuli, changing the level of editing, the mechanical production of verbal behavior, changing motivational and emotional variables, incubation, and so on. Skinner gives an example of the use of some of these techniques provided by an author.

== Logical and scientific ==
The special audience in this case is one concerned with "successful action". Special methods of stimulus control are encouraged that will allow for maximum effectiveness. Skinner notes that "graphs, models, tables" are forms of text that allow for this kind of development. The logical and scientific community also sharpens responses to assure accuracy and avoid distortion. Little progress in the area of science has been made from a verbal behavior perspective; however, suggestions of a research agenda have been laid out.

== Tacting private events ==
Private events are events accessible to only the speaker. Public events are events that occur outside of an organism's skin that are observed by more than one individual. A headache is an example of a private event and a car accident is an example of a public event.

The tacting of private events by an organism is shaped by the verbal community who differentially reinforce a variety of behaviors and responses to the private events that occur (Catania, 2007, p. 9). For example, if a child verbally states, "a circle" when a circle is in the immediate environment, it may be a tact. If a child verbally states, "I have a toothache", she/he may be tacting a private event, whereas the stimulus is present to the speaker, but not the rest of the verbal community.

The verbal community shapes the original development and the maintenance or discontinuation of the tacts for private events (Catania, 2007, p. 232). An organism responds similarly to both private stimuli and public stimuli (Skinner, 1957, p. 130). However, it is harder for the verbal community to shape the verbal behavior associated with private events (Catania, 2007, p. 403). It may be more difficult to shape private events, but there are critical things that occur within an organism's skin that should not be excluded from our understanding of verbal behavior (Catania, 2007, p. 9).

Several concerns are associated with tacting private events. Skinner (1957) acknowledged two major dilemmas. First, he acknowledges our difficulty with predicting and controlling the stimuli associated with tacting private events (p. 130). Catania (2007) describes this as the unavailability of the stimulus to the members of the verbal community (p. 253). The second problem Skinner (1957) describes is our current inability to understand how the verbal behavior associated with private events is developed (p. 131).

Skinner (1957) continues to describe four potential ways a verbal community can encourage verbal behavior with no access to the stimuli of the speaker. He suggests the most frequent method is via "a common public accompaniment". An example might be that when a kid falls and starts bleeding, the caregiver tells them statements like, "you got hurt". Another method is the "collateral response" associated with the private stimulus. An example would be when a kid comes running and is crying and holding their hands over their knee, the caregiver might make a statement like, "you got hurt". The third way is when the verbal community provides reinforcement contingent on the overt behavior and the organism generalizes that to the private event that is occurring. Skinner refers to this as a "metaphorical or metonymical extension". The final method that Skinner suggests may help form our verbal behavior is when the behavior is initially at a low level and then turns into a private event (Skinner, 1957, p. 134). This notion can be summarized by understanding that the verbal behavior of private events can be shaped through the verbal community by extending the language of tacts (Catania, 2007, p. 263).

Private events are limited and should not serve as "explanations of behavior" (Skinner, 1957, p. 254). Skinner (1957) continues to caution that, "the language of private events can easily distract us from the public causes of behavior" (see functions of behavior).

== Chomsky's review and replies ==
In 1959, Noam Chomsky published an influential critique of Verbal Behavior. Chomsky pointed out that children acquire their first language without being explicitly or overtly "taught" in a way that would be consistent with behaviorist theory (see Language acquisition and Poverty of the stimulus), and that Skinner's theories of "operants" and behavioral reinforcements are not able to account for the fact that people can speak and understand sentences that they have never heard before.

According to Frederick J. Newmeyer:

Chomsky's review has come to be regarded as one of the foundational documents of the discipline of cognitive psychology, and even after the passage of twenty-five years it is considered the most important refutation of behaviorism. Of all his writings, it was the Skinner review which contributed most to spreading his reputation beyond the small circle of professional linguists.

Chomsky's 1959 review, amongst his other work of the period, is generally thought to have been influential in the decline of behaviorism's influence within linguistics, philosophy and cognitive science. One reply to it was Kenneth MacCorquodale's 1970 paper On Chomsky's Review of Skinner's Verbal Behavior. MacCorquodale argued that Chomsky did not possess an adequate understanding of either behavioral psychology in general, or the differences between Skinner's behaviorism and other varieties. As a consequence, he argued, Chomsky made several serious errors of logic. On account of these problems, MacCorquodale maintains that the review failed to demonstrate what it has often been cited as doing, implying that those most influenced by Chomsky's paper probably already substantially agreed with him. Chomsky's review has been further argued to misrepresent the work of Skinner and others, including by taking quotes out of context. Chomsky has maintained that the review was directed at the way Skinner's variant of behavioral psychology "was being used in Quinean empiricism and naturalization of philosophy".

== Current research ==
Current research in verbal behavior is published in The Analysis of Verbal Behavior (TAVB), and other Behavior Analytic journals such as The Journal of the Experimental Analysis of Behavior (JEAB) and the Journal of Applied Behavior Analysis (JABA). Also research is presented at poster sessions and conferences, such as at regional Behavior Analysis conventions or Association for Behavior Analysis (ABA) conventions nationally or internationally. There is also a Verbal Behavior Special Interest Group (SIG) of the Association for Behavior Analysis (ABA) which has a mailing list.

Journal of Early and Intensive Behavior Intervention and the Journal of Speech-Language Pathology and Applied Behavior Analysis both publish clinical articles on interventions based on verbal behavior.

Skinner has argued that his account of verbal behavior might have a strong evolutionary parallel. In Skinner's essay, Selection by Consequences he argued that operant conditioning was a part of a three-level process involving genetic evolution, cultural evolution and operant conditioning. All three processes, he argued, were examples of parallel processes of selection by consequences. David L. Hull, Rodney E. Langman and Sigrid S. Glenn have developed this parallel in detail. This topic continues to be a focus for behavior analysts. Behavior analysts have been working on developing ideas based on Verbal Behaviour for fifty years, and despite this, experience difficulty explaining generative verbal behavior.

== See also ==
- The Analysis of Verbal Behavior
- Applied behavior analysis
- Child development
- Experimental analysis of behavior
- Functional analytic psychotherapy
- Jack Michael
- Reinforcement
- Relational frame theory
