= Mand (psychology) =

Psychology term

Mand is a term that B.F. Skinner used to describe a verbal operant in which the response is reinforced by a characteristic consequence and is therefore under the functional control of relevant conditions of deprivation or aversive stimulation. One cannot determine, based on form alone, whether a response is a mand; it is necessary to know the kinds of variables controlling a response in order to identify a verbal operant. A mand is sometimes said to "specify its reinforcement" although this is not always the case. Skinner introduced the mand as one of six primary verbal operants in his 1957 work, Verbal Behavior.

Chapter three of Skinner's work, Verbal Behavior, discusses a functional relationship called the mand. A mand is a form of verbal behavior that is controlled by deprivation, satiation, or what is now called motivating operations (MO), as well as a controlling history. An example of this would be asking for water when one is water deprived ("thirsty"). It is tempting to say that a mand describes its reinforcer, which it sometimes does. But many mands have no correspondence to the reinforcer. For example, a loud knock may be a mand "open the door" and a servant may be called by a hand clap as much as a child might "ask for milk."

Mands differ from other verbal operants in that they primarily benefit the speaker, whereas other verbal operants function primarily for the benefit of the listener. This is not to say that mand's function exclusively in favor of the speaker, however; Skinner gives the example of the advice, "Go west!" as having the potential to yield consequences which will be reinforcing to both speaker and listener. When warnings such as "Look out!" are heeded, the listener may avoid aversive stimulation.

The Lamarre & Holland (1985) study on mands would be one example of a research study in this area.

== Dynamic properties ==
The mand form, being under the control of deprivation and stimulation, will vary in energy level. Dynamic qualities are to be understood as variations that arise as a function of multiple causes. Dynamic, in this case, as opposed to how someone reading from a text might sound if they do not simulate the normal dynamic qualities of verbal behavior. Mands tend to be permanent when they are acquired.

== Extended mands ==
Emitting mands to objects or animals that cannot possibly supply an appropriate response would be an example of the extended mand. Telling "stop!" to someone out of earshot, perhaps in a film, who is about to hurt themselves is an example of the extended mand. Extended mands occur due to extended stimulus control. In the case of an extended mand, the listener is unable to deliver consequences that would reinforce the mand, but they have enough in common with listeners that have previously reinforced the mand that stimulus control can be inferred.

=== Superstitious mands ===
Mands directed to inanimate objects may be said to be superstitious mands. Mands to an unreliable car to "come on and start" for example may be due to a history of intermittent reinforcement.

=== Magical mands ===
A magical mand is a mand form where the consequences specified in the mand have never occurred. The form "Give me a million dollars" has never before produced a million dollars and so would be classified as a magical mand. Skinner posits that many literary mands are of the magical form. Prayer might also be analyzed as belonging in one of the above three categories, depending upon one's opinion of the likelihood and mechanism of its answer.

== Clinical application ==
Failure to mand adequately appears to be correlated with destructive behavior. This seems to be especially true for those with developmental disabilities.

The mand model is used in ABA therapy and aims to improve communication skills. The mand model involves interaction between the therapist and the child. The therapist creates an environment that encourages the child to make a request. For example, if a child likes to play with a particular toy, the therapist might hold the toy in their hands, prompting the child to ask for it.

Mands play an important role in developing communication skills in children with autism and other communication disorders. One of the significant advantages of mand within therapeutic services for individuals with autism is that it can help reduce maladaptive behavior. Mand training can help these individuals navigate the communication process, first learning to make a request by using a simple gesture or word, and then gradually transitioning to using full sentences and seeking permission. Mand is a good skill for early learning because reinforcement is natural, as when they ask for something, they receive it, rather than just receiving praise or something unrelated. Once a person learns that they can access preferred items during communication, other communicative skills may follow.

== See also ==
- Imperative mood
- Tact (psychology)
