= Bijou =

Bijou is a French word meaning 'jewel', often loosely applied to buildings to mean small and elegant. It may also refer to:

== Buildings ==
- Bijou Theatre (Boston), Massachusetts
- Bijou Palace, also known as the Al-Gawhara Palace, Cairo, Egypt
- Bijou Theater (Chicago), Illinois
- Bijou Theater (Hermosa Beach), California
- Bijou Theatre (Knoxville, Tennessee)
- Bijou Theatre (Manhattan, 1878), former Broadway theater in New York City
- Bijou Theatre (Manhattan, 1917), former Broadway theater in New York City
- Bijou Theatre Building, Marinette, Wisconsin
- Bijou Theatre, Melbourne, Australia
- Bijou Theatre, Sydney, Australia
- Royal Bijou Theatre, a former theatre in Paignton, Devon, England

== Arts, entertainment, and media ==
=== Fictional characters ===
- Bijou, a character in the South Korean manhwa series Ragnarok
- Andréia Bijou, a character in the Brazilian telenovela Duas Caras
- Bijou, a character in the American war film Passage to Marseille
- Bijou, a hamster in the Japanese anime series Hamtaro
- Bijou, a fish in the American television series FishCenter Live

=== Film and television ===
- Bijou (film), a 1972 American film directed by Wakefield Poole

=== Music ===
- Bijou is the title of the fourth track on the 1960 album The Hottest New Group in Jazz by Lambert, Hendricks & Ross
- Bijou (album), a 1975 live album by jazz saxophonist Archie Shepp
- "Bijou" (Queen song), song by Queen from the 1991 album Innuendo

== People ==
- Bijou Heron (1863–1937), American stage actress
- Bijou Fernandez (1877–1961), American stage and silent film actress
- Koseki Bijou, VTuber
- Bijou Phillips (born 1980), American actress, model, and singer
- Sidney W. Bijou (1908–2009), American child psychologist
- Jude Bijou (born 1946), American licensed psychotherapist, lecturer, and multi-award winning author
- Bijou (footballer) (born 1986), Cape Verdean former footballer
- Bijou (DJ), American record producer, and DJ
- Bijou Thaangjam, Indian actor, lyricist, art director, chef, and entrepreneur

== Places ==
- Bijou, California, a town in South Lake Tahoe
- Bijou Geyser, in the Upper Geyser Basin of Yellowstone
- Bijou Hills, South Dakota, a census-designated place
- Bijou Park, California, a town in South Lake Tahoe
- A main downtown artery in Colorado Springs, Colorado

== Other uses ==
- Bijou (cocktail), a gin-based cocktail
- Bijou (jewellery), small pieces of valuable or costume jewellery
- Citroën Bijou, a coupé car manufactured by Citroën
- Bijou bottle, a small vial used in laboratories

== See also ==
- Bijoux (disambiguation)
