= Donald Baer =

Donald Baer may refer to:

- Donald A. Baer (born 1954), CEO of Burson-Marsteller, former adviser to President Bill Clinton, and chairman of the PBS board
- Donald M. Baer (1931–2002), American psychologist
