= Attitude Reconstruction =

Book by Jude Bijou

Attitude Reconstruction: A Blueprint for Building a Better Life is a book written by American author and psychotherapist Jude Bijou. The book was 2012 Winner of ForeWord Review in both psychology and self-help, the 2012 IBPA Benjamin Franklin Award in self-help, and the 2012 Nautilus Silver Award in personal growth/psychology. It proposes that unexpressed sadness, anger, and fear are the root causes of all negative attitudes and perceived problems.

The author, daughter of pioneer behavioral child psychologist Sidney W. Bijou, blends eastern philosophy with western innovation to create a holistic system of human behavior.

== Synopsis ==
Bijou asserts that humans have only six emotions, existing in three opposing pairs – sadness and joy, anger and love, fear and peace. Attitude Reconstruction correlates these six emotions with predictable feelings, thoughts, communication, and actions.

The author proposes that emotions are nothing but energy, or pure physical sensations in the body; when we do not release sadness, anger, and fear from hurts and losses, we revert to predictable destructive attitudes. When not in the grip of these three emotions, the author states our attitudes embody the other three emotions – joy, love, and peace. Bijou's central methodology incorporates physically and constructively releasing emotional energy from the body through crying, stomping, or shivering in order to restore calm and clarity.

Attitude Reconstruction includes a Blueprint of the mind created by Bijou, who says there are four universal attitudes that accompany each emotion. She found the core attitudes associated with the emotions of joy, love, and peace boil down to three ultimate attitudes – honor yourself, accept other people and situations, and stay present and specific.

== Reception ==
- 2012 Winner for Benjamin Franklin Award in Self-Help
- 2012 Winner ForeWord Reviews in Psychology and Self-Help
- 2012 Silver Nautilus Award in Self-Help / Personal Growth / Psychology
- 2011-2012 Winner Los Angeles Book Festival in How-to category
- 2012 Winner International Book Awards in Health: Psychology/Mental Health
