= Bijoux =

Bijoux may refer to:

- Bijoux Terner, a global chain of fashion retail stores
- Bijoux Falls Provincial Park, a small park in British Columbia, Canada
- Les Bijoux (comics), a Korean cartoon
- Bijoux, the name of the dog on the 1980s American television series Hooperman
- Les Bijoux, a 1997 short film by Khady Sylla
- Les Bijoux (album), album by Sumi Jo
- "Bijoux", a song by Manitoba on the 2003 album Up in Flames
- Caroline Bijoux, a South African chess player

== See also ==
- Bijou (disambiguation)
