= Betty Hart =

American education researcher (1927–2012)

Betty Hart (born Bettie Mackenzie Farnsworth, July 15, 1927 – September 28, 2012) was an American education researcher, known for her work on the relation between vocabulary learning and social inequality, in particular the word gap. She graduated from the University of California, Berkeley, went on to do graduate work in psychology at Washington University, and later received her PhD from Kansas University, where she also became a professor at the Lifespan Institute.

In 1995 she and her former graduate adviser Todd Risley published the book Meaningful Differences in the Everyday Experience of Young American Children, based on a longitudinal study of parent-child interactions in 42 families of varying socio-economic class. They argued that educational outcomes were significantly affected by parenting practices, particularly the daily time parents spend talking to their children in early childhood. The book argued that parents from low-income families spoke less to their children than high income parents, leading to a disparity in which, at age four, low income children had heard on the average 32 million words fewer than their high income peers. The study concerned not only the quantity, but also the nature, of the verbal interactions between children and parents. Factors they considered important included the ratio of encouragements to prohibitions in the input to the child, and the extent to which parents followed up on topics initiated by the child. The child with the largest vocabulary in their study was a lower socio-economic class child from a family with a highly interactive conversational style. The importance of social factors in language learning was elaborated in their 1999 book The Social World of Children Learning to Talk.

Differences in early language experience were argued to be an important factor in lower educational achievement and the perpetuation of socio-economic disparities between generations. The study was widely influential and inspired the establishment of many government programs aimed at changing the linguistic practices of low income parents. Some subsequent scholars have thrown doubt on Hart and Risley's findings, arguing that Hart and Risley's study was methodologically unsound and that the language disparity reported by Hart and Risley does not in fact exist and cannot be considered causal for the disparity of education outcomes.

Hart married Dr. John Hart in 1949, and divorced in 1961. She died in 2012 in Tucson, Arizona, due to lung cancer.
