= Donald M. Baer =

American psychologist (1931–2002)

- Born: October 25, 1931; St. Louis, Missouri, U.S.
- Died: April 28, 2002; Lawrence, Kansas, U.S.
- Education: University of Chicago
- Known for: Behavior analysis, operant conditioning, applied behavior analysis, behavior analysis of child development
- Scientific career
- Fields: Psychology
- Workplaces: University of Kansas; University of Washington

Donald M. Baer (October 25, 1931 – April 28, 2002) was an American psychologist who contributed to the science of applied behavior analysis and pioneered the development of behavior analysis at the University of Kansas and the University of Washington. Baer is best known for his contributions at the University of Kansas. Throughout his career, he published over two hundred articles, books, and chapters on various psychological issues. Some of his most noteworthy contributions include literature on behavior-analytic theory, experimental design, and early childhood interventions. Baer received numerous awards during his lifetime which acknowledged his innovation and dedication to his field of research.

== Background information ==
Donald M. Baer was born in St. Louis, Missouri, on October 25, 1931. His father was a labor organizer which required his family to move frequently. Don later gained early admittance to the University of Chicago where he received his doctoral degree in 1957 under the direction of Jacob L. Gewirtz (Poulson, 2002). After graduation, Baer began working with Sidney W. Bijou at the University of Washington. Baer was soon offered a faculty position at the University of Kansas where he remained until his death on April 28, 2002. He is survived by his wife, Elsie Pinkston, and his three daughters.

== Early work ==
Collectively, Baer and Bijou established the behavior analysis approach to child development at the University of Washington (Anonymous, 2002). From 1957 to 1965, Baer and Bijou conducted an array of research on the effects of reinforcement contingencies on children (Anonymous, 2002). An influential paper titled "Effect of withdrawal of positive reinforcement on an extinguishing response in young children" was written during this time (Baer, 1961). This research article established the effectiveness of "withdrawal of positive reinforcement" as a means of reducing behavior (Baer, 1961, p. 1).

While at the University of Washington, Baer made another noteworthy research paper on the escape and avoidance behaviors of preschool children (Baer, 1960). Unfortunately, Baer and his research associates became involved in a "typical Psychology civil war" at the University of Washington (Baer, 1993., pp. 570). The war stemmed from the administration's "intolerance of Skinnerian perspectives and the rejection of research using single-subject designs." (Horowitz, 2002., pp. 313). Seeking a university environment more welcoming of behavior analysis, Don Baer found his way to the newly formed Human Development and Family Life Department at the University of Kansas.

The establishment of the Human Development and Family Life Department at the University of Kansas is a somewhat turbulent chain of events. The following comes from Baer (1993), unless otherwise stated. Due to various professors retiring, the University of Kansas decided to dissolve its Home Economics Department in the early 1960s. As a result, over $2 million in funding remained unused. A recently acquired academic researcher, Frances Horowitz, pleaded to the Kansas administration to simply transform the Home Economics Department into the Department of Human Development and Family Life. The Home Economics Department was already a well known childhood research center. The administration agreed and appointed Horowitz chair of the department. Horowitz assumed the task of recruiting researchers. Horowitz and Donald Baer had conversed at American Psychological Association (APA) meetings for years and became great friends. At an APA meeting in Los Angeles, Horowitz asked Baer if he would be "interested in a challenge" (Baer, 1993. pp. 570). The challenge Horowitz was referring to was establishing a new doctoral program from the ground up. Don Baer remained at the department and began expanding the program to the highest degree.

== A fresh start ==
At the University of Kansas, Baer began recruiting behavioral researchers for his newly formed department (Glover, pp. 146). Among those recruited, Baer began research with Montrose M. Wolf, Todd R. Risley, and James A. Sherman. The fruits of their research yielded the development of the discipline of applied behavior analysis (ABA) at the University of Kansas late in the 1960s. Applied behavior analysis concentrates on "empirically-based interventions into problems of individual, social, and cultural importance" (Anonymous, 2002, p. 1). This discipline provided a structure for working with developmentally delayed children and adults. According to Glover (1987), Baer established at Kansas "one of the outstanding centers for research in applied behavior analysis" (pp. 146).

The following comes from Colman (1994), unless otherwise stated. Shortly after the establishment of ABA program, the first journal, Journal of Applied Behavior Analysis, dedicated to the discipline was published in 1968. In the first issue, Baer, Wolf, and Risley (1968) published "Some current dimensions of applied behavior analysis". This groundbreaking article named seven definitive dimensions to the approach of behavior analysis. The seven dimensions state that "work in the field should be applied, behavioral, analytic, technological, conceptually systematic, effective and capable of generalized effects." (pp. 406). Twenty years later, Baer et al. published an updated version, "Some still current dimensions of applied behavior analysis" (pp. 406). The seven dimensions had not changed, only elaborated on, throughout the years.

== Later work ==
The following comes from Hains (1989), unless otherwise stated. Baer published hundreds of articles and books. He coauthored a paper with an associate, Ann H. Hains, in 1989 on experimental design entitled "Interaction effects in multi-element designs: Inevitable, desirable, and ignorable". In this paper, Baer addressed the single mindedness of the authors of single-subject research design books. He stated that these researchers only investigated the effectiveness of treatments in alteration and never examined whether the treatments interact. Baer proposed that single subject designs can and should be used to study not only separate effects but also interactions between the two conditions.

Developing new techniques and approaches for teaching developmentally delayed children was Baer's passion (Anonymous, 2002). He wrote many articles analyzing the current public education system and ways to improve their methods (Anonymous, 2002). The following comes from Warren et al. (1981), unless otherwise stated. One of his most read articles is titled "Generalization and maintenance of question-asking by severely retarded individuals". This article states the importance of establishing question asking strategies with developmentally-delayed children.

Normal children develop simple question-asking (e.g. "What's that") in early infancy (pp. 15). Severely retarded children usually have great difficulty developing this skill. Initial training for this strategy is costly and time consuming for school systems. Despite the vast amount of time spent with the children, they can easily lose this ability. Baer and colleagues urged school systems to establish maintenance programs to help developmentally delayed children to continue and improve on their question-asking strategy. By maintaining this ability with the children, they will not only improve question-asking but save the school system valuable time and money from remedial training.

== Honors ==
Donald M. Baer was an influential leader of the Department of Human Development and Family Life (later called the Department of Applied Behavioral Sciences) at the University of Kansas. He advised over 100 doctoral students while at Kansas, in addition to countless other graduate students. He contributed to the Bureau of Child Research, now known as the Schiefelbusch Life Span Institute (LSI). The program was successful, receiving years of funding from the National Institute of Mental Health. The Institute was also the first to obtain an award from the Society for the Advancement of Behavior Analysis (SABA) for its contributions to the field.

== Awards ==
Baer won the Edgar A. Doll Award for his assistance to those with developmental disorders. In 1987 he was awarded the Don Hake Award from Division 25 of the American Psychological Association. In 1997, he won the award for Distinguished Service to Behavior Analysis from SABA. Baer served as president of the Society for the Experimental Analysis of Behavior from 1983 to 1984. He served as an editor for the Journal of Applied Behavior Analysis (1970–1971). As well as serving as an associated editor of the American Journal of Mental Deficiency. Baer also spent much time traveling to other countries, including Australia, Japan, and Spain, while serving as a distinguished visiting professor.

He died April 28, 2002, of heart failure in Lawrence, Kansas. His ashes are buried at Pioneer Cemetery in Lawrence, Kansas.

Author of Publication on Donald Baer: Kevin Phelan - University of North Carolina, Wilmington - 2008 - PSY 410 - History and Systems of Psychology - Final Paper
