= Bijou Geyser =

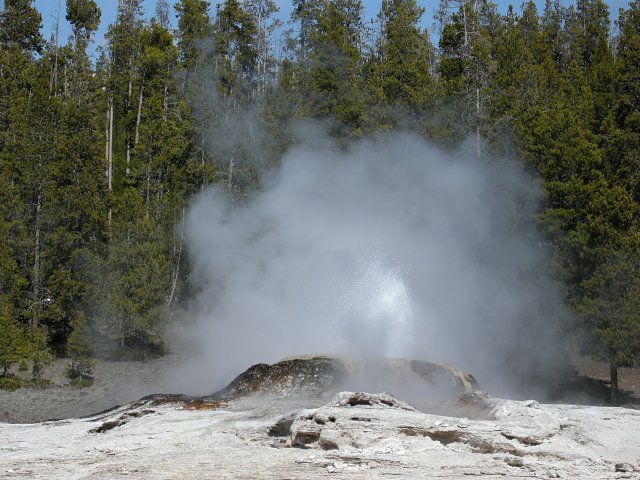
- Bijou Geyser
- Interactive map of Bijou Geyser
- Location: Upper Geyser Basin, Yellowstone National Park, Teton County, Wyoming
- Coordinates: 44°28′17″N 110°50′26″W
- Elevation: 7,319 feet (2,231 m)
- Type: Geyser
- Eruption height: up to 15 feet (4.6 m)
- Frequency: Continuous
- Duration: Continuous

Bijou Geyser is a geyser in the Upper Geyser Basin of Yellowstone National Park in the United States.

== Eruptions ==
Bijou erupts nearly continuously reaching a height of 15 feet (4.6 m). At times, the water fountain turns to a steam phase when Bijou emits a column of steam.

=== Sequence ===
Bijou is part of the Giant Group and is connected to Giant Geyser and Grotto Geyser. While Bijou erupts almost all the time, there are periods where it ceases erupting. There are three conditions that can cause this to happen.

The first is a pause in activity because water levels on the Giant Platform, the raised area where the Giant Group is located, are rising.

The second condition is caused by a marathon play session by Grotto Geyser. About five to six hours into a marathon by Grotto, Bijou will slow and eventually cease playing. Between four and six hours after Grotto stops, Bijou will recover and begin playing again.

The third condition is called a Giant Hot Period. This is an indicator that Giant Geyser might erupt. When Giant does erupt, it takes a minimum of eight hours for Bijou to recover and begin playing again.

== See also ==
- List of Yellowstone geothermal features
