= Montrose Wolf =

American psychologist (1935–2004)

- Born: May 29, 1935; Houston, Texas
- Died: March 19, 2004 (aged 68); Lawrence, Kansas
- Education: University of Houston; Arizona State University
- Known for: Teaching Family Model; Journal of Applied Behavior Analysis
- Scientific career
- Fields: Psychology, linguistics, Applied Behavior Analysis
- Workplaces: University of Washington; Arizona State University; University of Kansas

Montrose Madison Wolf (May 29, 1935 – March 19, 2004) was an American psychologist. He developed the technique of "time-out" as a learning tool to shape behavior in children in the 1960s. He was a leader in creating the discipline of problem-solving, real-world psychological research known as applied behavior analysis. He created the Teaching Family Model as an intervention program for dealing with juvenile delinquents. He helped replicate this model almost 800 times. In the field of applied behavior analysis he introduced and named the concept of social validity.

Donald Baer, Sidney W. Bijou, Todd Risley, James Sherman, and Wolf established the Journal of Applied Behavior Analysis, in 1968 as a peer-reviewed journal publishing research about experimental analysis of behavior and its practical applications.
