= Grotto Geyser =

Geyser in Yellowstone National Park, Wyoming

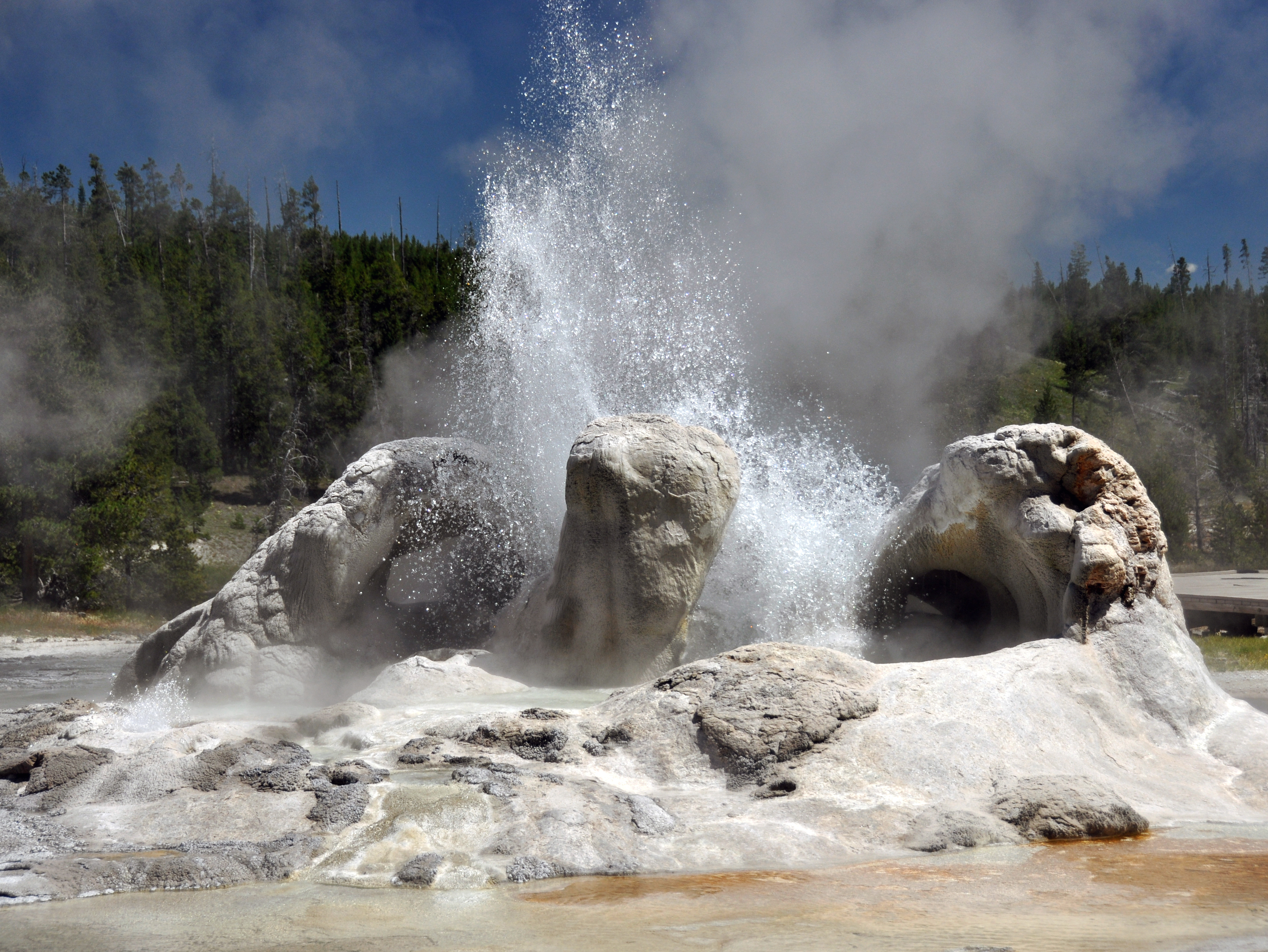

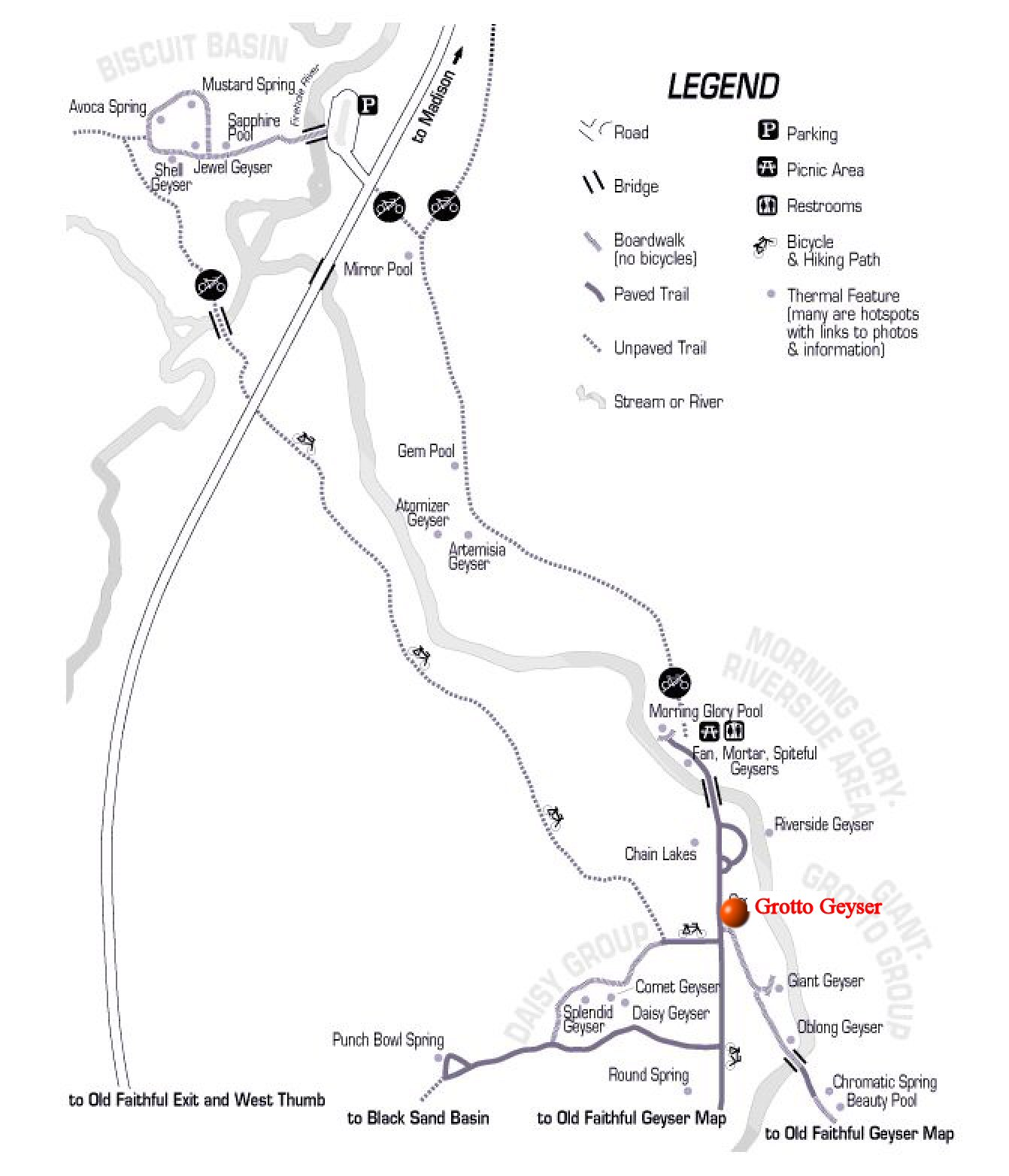
- North section of Upper Geyser Basin
- Name origin: Grotto Geyser
- Location: Upper Geyser Basin, Yellowstone National Park, Teton County, Wyoming
- Coordinates: 44°28′19″N 110°50′30″W
- Elevation: 7,326 feet (2,233 m)
- Type: Fountain geyser
- Eruption height: 10 feet (3.0 m)
- Frequency: 8 hours
- Duration: 1 to 10 hours

Grotto Geyser is a cone-type geyser located in the Upper Geyser Basin in Yellowstone National Park in the United States. Grotto Geyser is the namesake for the group of geysers that includes Grotto Fountain Geyser, South Grotto Fountain Geyser, Indicator Spring, Spa Geyser, Startling Geyser, and Rocket Geyser.

== History ==
On September 18, 1870, members of the Washburn-Langford-Doane Expedition entered the Upper Geyser Basin where in a day and a half of exploration, they named seven geysers of which Grotto was one. Nathaniel P. Langford described the Grotto in his 1871 Scribner's account:

"The Grotto" was so named from its singular crater of vitrified sinter, full of large, sinuous apertures. Through one of these, on our first visit, one of our company crawled to the discharging orifice; and when, a few hours afterwards, he saw a volume of boiling water, four feet in diameter, shooting through, it to the height of sixty feet, and a scalding stream of two hundred inches flowing from the aperture he had entered a short time before, he concluded he had narrowly escaped being summarily cooked. The discharge of this geyser continued for nearly half an hour.

== Eruptions ==
Grotto Geyser erupts about every eight hours. The interval between eruptions is longer after a longer eruption. The eruptions are about 10 feet (3.0 m) high and can last from about 1 hour to more than 10 hours long, although there have been eruptions that lasted more than 26 hours.

=== Sequence ===
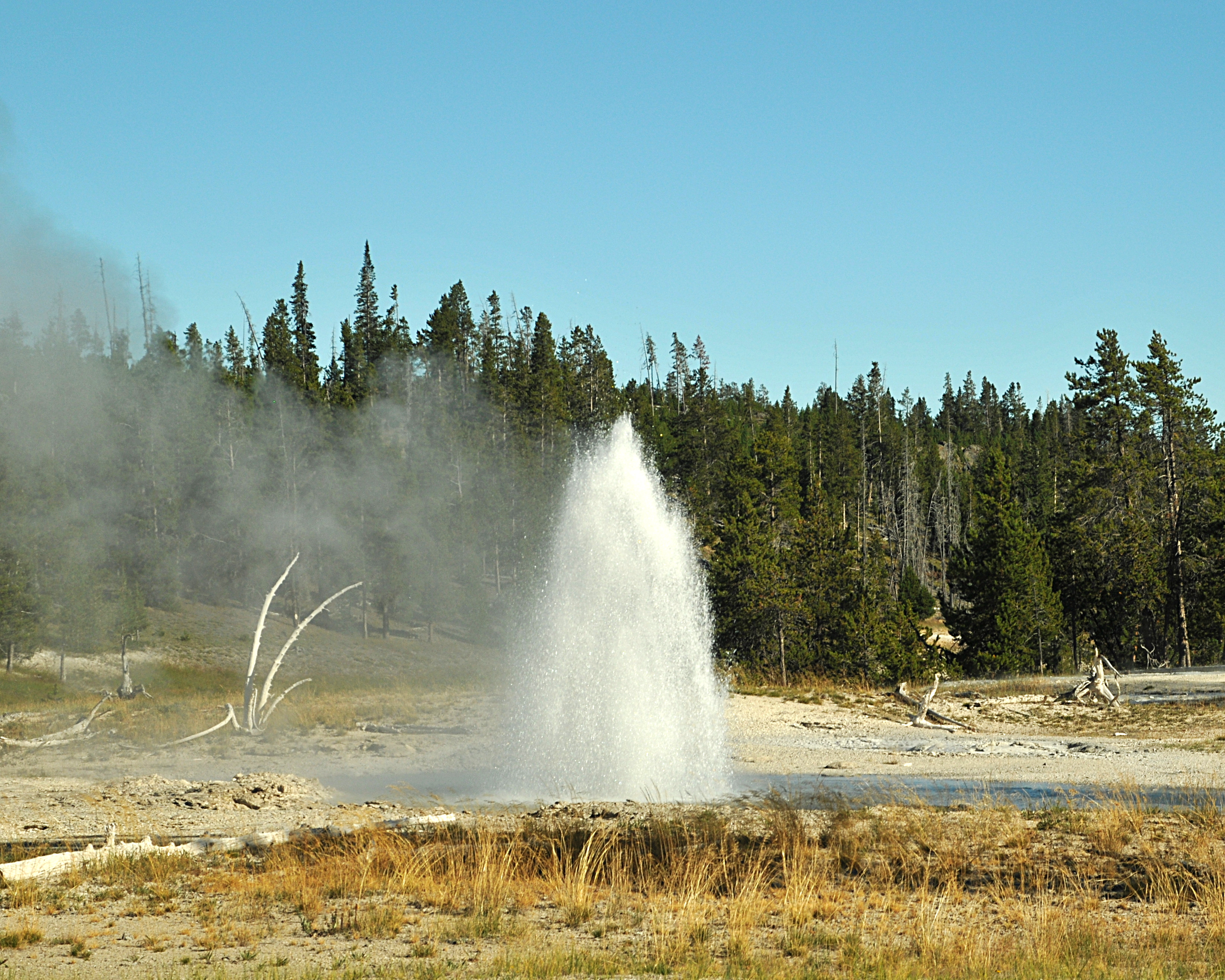
Grotto Fountain Geyser

Grotto Geyser is connected with at least five other geysers in the surrounding area. Eruptions are usually preceded by an eruption from Grotto Fountain Geyser, or both Grotto Fountain Geyser and South Grotto Fountain Geyser. But if the latter erupts on its own, it will delay both eruptions from Grotto Fountain Geyser and Grotto Geyser itself. After Grotto has a short mode eruption, which lasts about 1 to 2 hours, Rocket Geyser usually has a major eruption. Approximately three-quarters of Grotto's eruptions are short mode. Grotto Geyser and Rocket Geyser erupt together. When Grotto Geyser has a long mode eruption, which lasts from 6 to 12 hours, Spa Geyser, instead of Rocket Geyser, erupts.

=== Connection with Giant Geyser ===
Grotto is significant beyond its own considerable size because of the interactions between its own eruptions and those of nearby Giant Geyser, one of the world's most powerful geysers. Giant erupts only during so-called "hot periods," times of intensified activity and rising water among the smaller geysers surrounding Giant. Most hot periods do not lead to Giant eruptions, but Giant eruptions frequently start during the hot period immediately following the start of a Grotto eruption. Additionally, the long, "marathon" eruptions of Grotto are commonly followed, a few hours after they end, by a particularly intense "recovery hot period" in the Giant complex that may instigate a Giant eruption. Giant eruptions may also occur 4 to 5 hours after the start of a Grotto marathon eruption.

== Physical structure ==
Grotto Geyser's cone is nearly 8 feet (2.4 m) high. The odd shape comes from sinter accumulating over dead tree stumps as the geyser erupted.

Images of Grotto Geyser
Grotto Geyser erupting, 2019

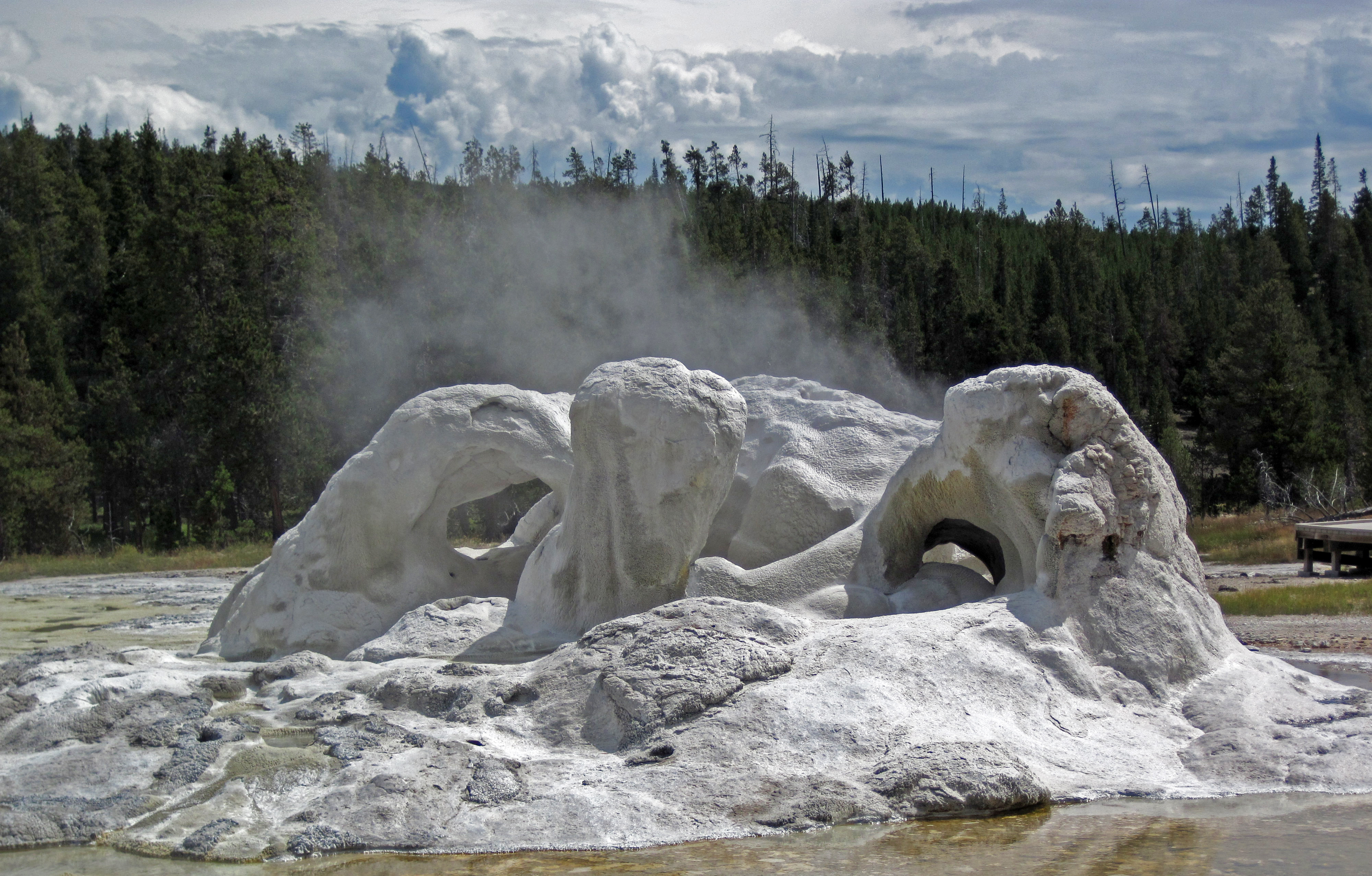
At rest, 2015

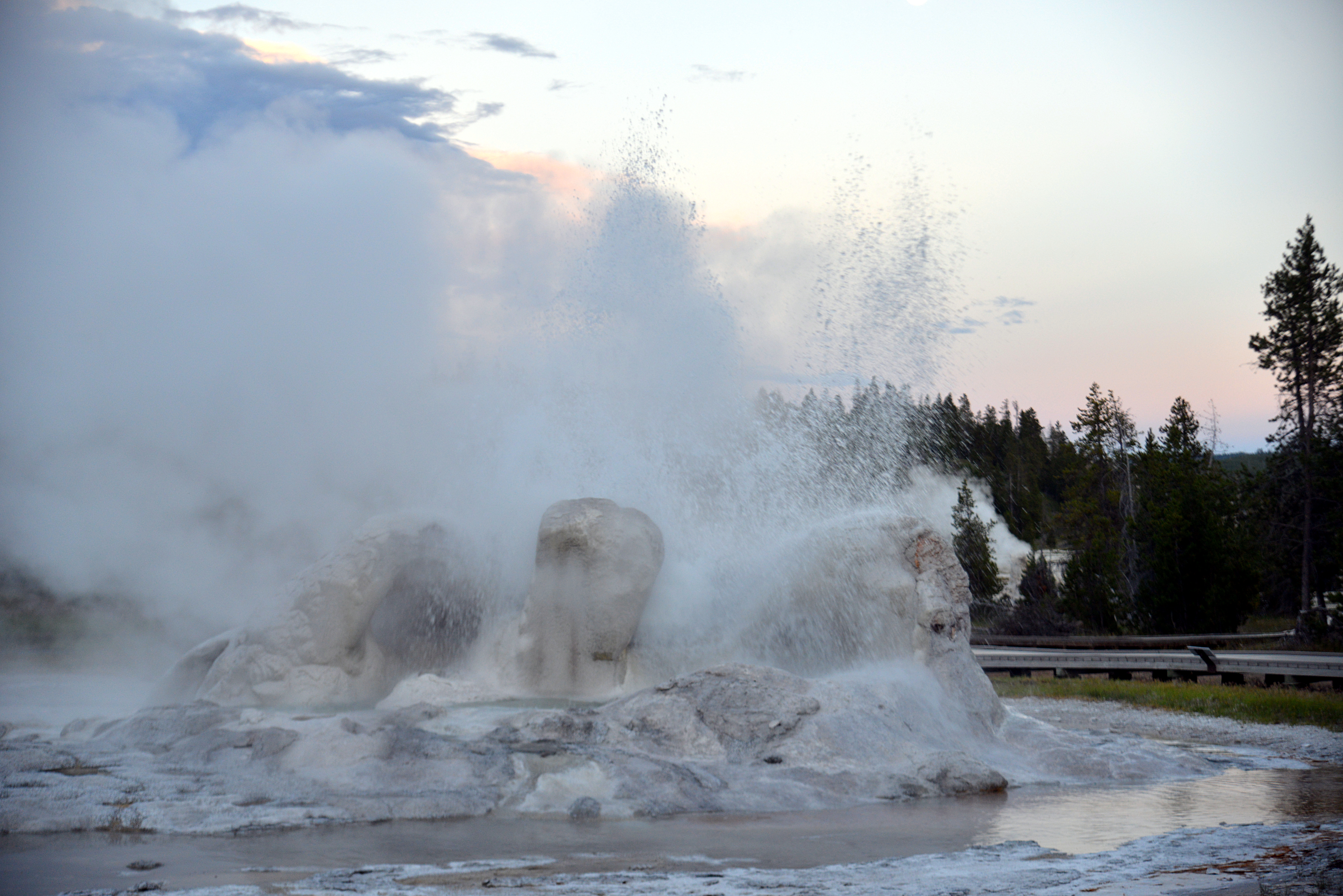
Grotto geyser erupting in Upper Geyser Basin, 2019

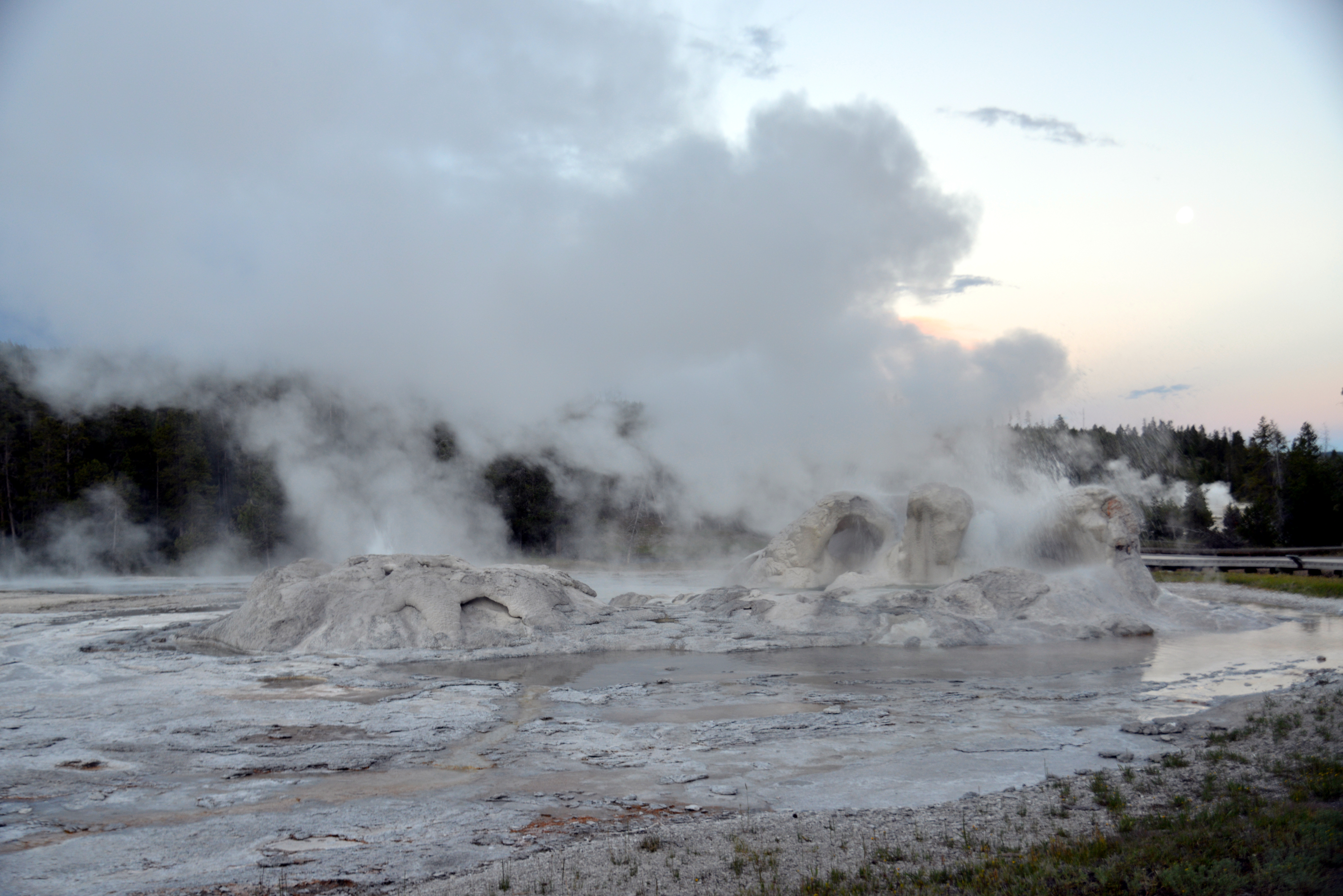
Grotto geyser in the early morning, 2019

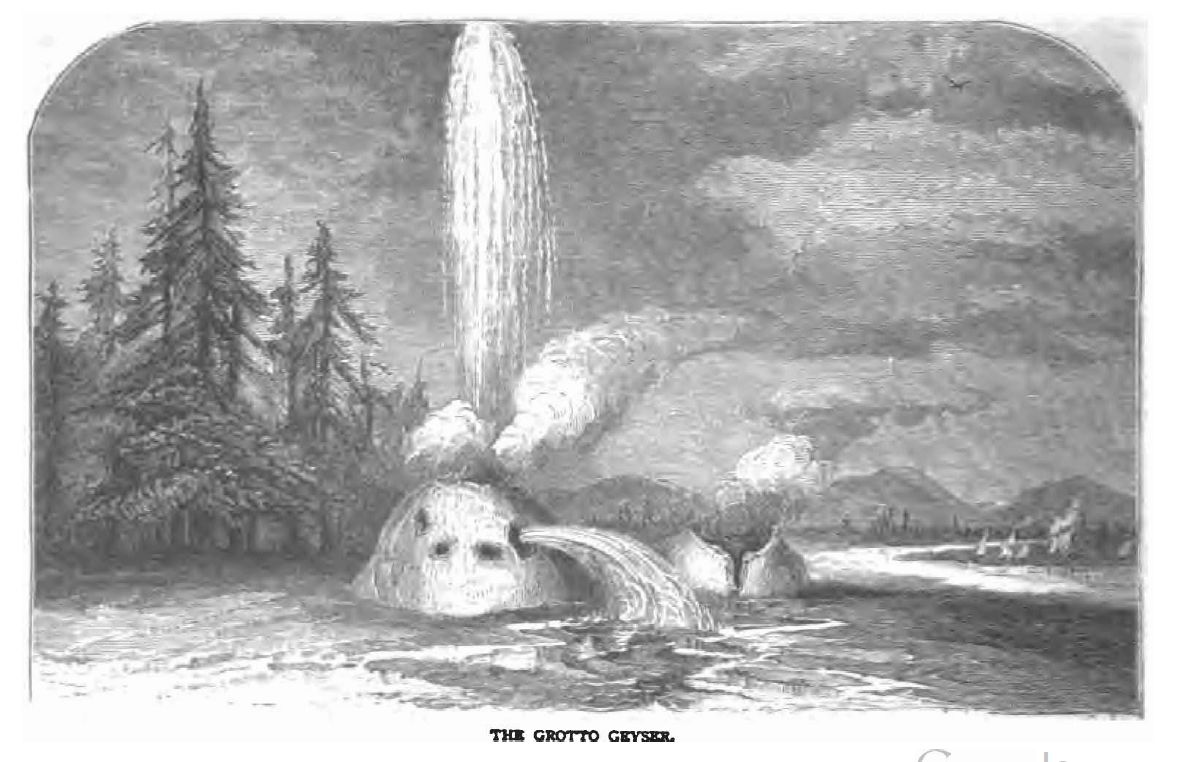
Sketch of Grotto Geyser, 1871

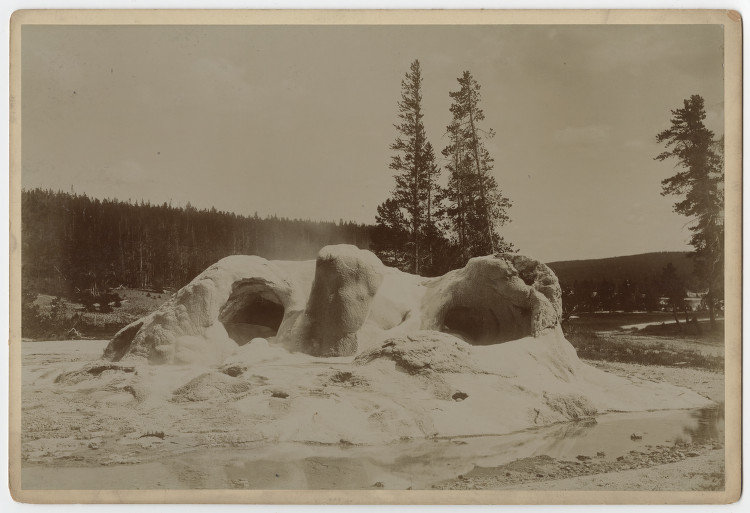
Grotto Geyser, ca. 1888. Photo by F. Jay Haynes.

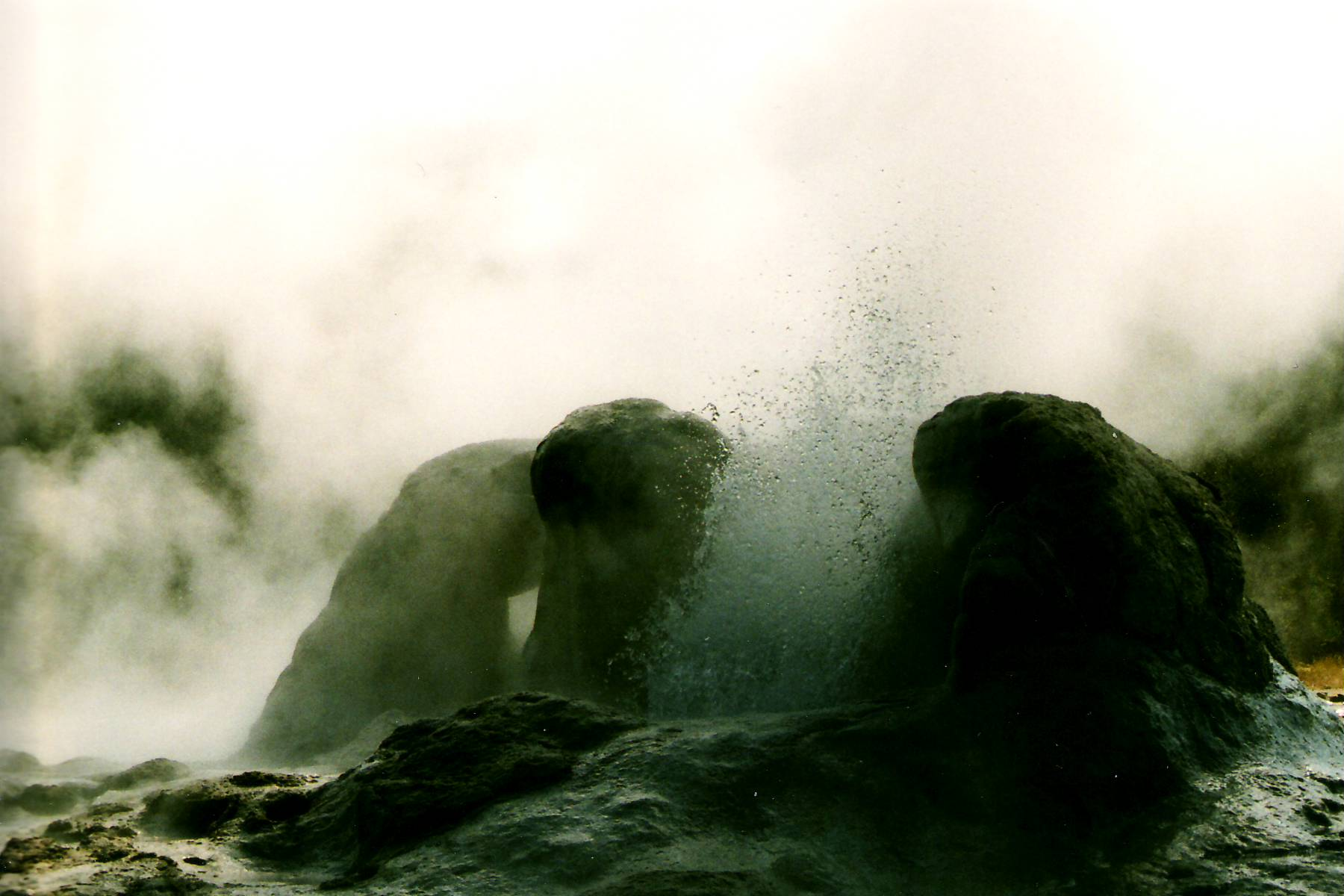
Close up of Grotto Geyser, 2009

== See also ==
- Yellowstone National Park
- List of Yellowstone geothermal features
