= Word gap =

Term related to educational inequalities

The term 30-million-word gap (often shortened to just word gap) was originally coined by Betty Hart and Todd R. Risley in their book Meaningful Differences in the Everyday Experience of Young American Children, and subsequently reprinted in the article "The Early Catastrophe: The 30 Million Word Gap by Age 3". In their study of 42 Midwestern families, Hart and Risley physically recorded an hour's worth of language in each home once a month over 2½ years. Families were classified by socioeconomic status (SES) into "high" (professional), "middle/low" (working class) and "welfare" SES. They found that the average child in a professional family hears 2,153 words per waking hour, the average child in a working-class family hears 1,251 words per hour, and an average child in a welfare family only 616 words per hour. Extrapolating, they stated that, "in four years, an average child in a professional family would accumulate experience with almost 45 million words, an average child in a working-class family 26 million words, and an average child in a welfare family 13 million words."

The authors found a correlation between word exposure and the rate of vocabulary acquisition in the subject children. The recordings showed that high-SES toddlers spoke approximately two new words a day between their second and third birthdays, middle-/low-SES children one word per day, and welfare SES children 0.5 words per day. Spoken words are a measure of productive vocabulary. It is thought that during children's vocabulary development the productive vocabulary mirrors their underlying receptive vocabulary growth.

The authors and subsequent researchers have posited that the word gap—or certainly the differing rates of vocabulary acquisition—partially explains the achievement gap in the United States, the persistent disparity in educational performance among subgroups of U.S. students, especially subgroups defined by socioeconomic status and race.

== History of language gap research ==
=== Before Hart & Risley ===
Prior to the 30-million-word-gap study, extensive research had noted strong institutional variation in student success on standardized tests. The initial attention to achievement gap started with a 1966 publication from the U.S. Department of Education titled "Equality of Educational Opportunity." The publication begins the onset of achievement gap by acknowledging that there is a great disparity within educational outcomes as a result of inequitable institutions, especially those that were not seen as part of the purview of schools such as cultural, socioeconomic, and linguistic realities of students at home. The National Assessment of Educational Progress (NAEP) had further been used to census information that various studies used to show achievement gaps across a number of demographics. The idea of equity in education had also given rise to similar gap discourse around the world.

=== Hart & Risley's contribution ===
Hart and Risley (2003) spent 2½ years observing 42 families for an hour each month to learn what typical home life was like for 1- and 2-year-old children. The families were grouped into 4 variables, upper SES, middle SES, lower SES and just a few that were on welfare. The middle- and low-SES families were grouped in the final analysis. They found that by age 3 children in welfare families had a vocabulary of 525 words where children in upper-SES families had vocabulary of 1,116 words. They also found that the children in upper-class families were learning vocabulary at a faster rate. The researchers suggested the reason for this difference is because the welfare children heard on average 616 words per hour where professional-family children heard on average 2,153 words per hour. Thus, proposing the 30-million-word gap. The achievement gap is explained as a result of the language gap, in that because children are lacking in their vocabulary and literary skills, they will not be as successful in academics. Hart and Risley argue this is an indispensable societal concern because it sets the child at a disadvantage for not being exposed to more vocabulary skills at a young age.

=== Socioeconomic status studies ===
Fernald, Marchman, and Weisleder (2013) followed forty eight children from when they were eighteen months old through when they reached twenty four months (in other words, from one and a half through two years) and categorized households as either low or high socioeconomic status (SES). The researchers measured the number of words each child knew the meanings of at the beginning of the study, the number of new words each child learned over time, how fast each child correctly matched a word and its meaning, and whether any of those things were impacted by SES. A researcher showed a child two images, such as a car and a bike, asked the child which image was the car, and noted where the child looked or pointed. On average, at eighteen months old, high SES children already knew sixty seven more words than low SES children. In addition, they correctly matched words and meanings somewhat faster. Over the next six months, they learned new words faster. By twenty four months, the high SES participants knew about one hundred fifty four more words than the low SES participants. The scores of high children at the beginning of the study and low children at the end were very similar. Fernald et al. cite other research concluding the faster a person recognizes a word, the less mental energy that person needs to spend on understanding new words. Put another way, the more words a person already knows, the easier it is for them to learn more. Thus even a small advantage at eighteen months old could grow into a huge advantage by adulthood.

=== Educational system studies ===
Sperry, Sperry, and Miller (2018) was a very similar study to HR that got somewhat different results. Like HR it was a long term study, researchers observed forty two children at home interacting with caregivers, and the children were between eighteen and forty eight months old (between one and a half and four years). The researchers used similar social classes as HR for comparison: middle class, working class, lower class, and poor "welfare" class. During each visit, they spoke to participants as if they were a family friend, and the researchers measured three things. First the number of words spoken by a primary caregiver to a child. Second the number spoken by any and all caregivers to the child. Third the number spoken by anybody in hearing range, even it was not directed at the child. SSM did not replicate HR's thirty million word gap. First of all, the gap between children in the same SES was larger than the gap between those in two different SESs. Second of all, when the researchers counted the words from anybody in hearing range, the gap between middle and poor / welfare SES got smaller.

Garcia and Otheguy (2016) were interested in the origins and validity of the Language Gap, and how the preconceptions of it impact bilingual and bidialectical children, specifically from Latino and Black backgrounds. They focused more so on how people talk about and understand language as a whole, especially within the education system. Their argument claims language is a semiotic process that involves sound, touch, and gestures and should be seen as a translanguaging-internalist perspective. She offers historical context to give insight to the creation of the Language Gap and the biases it may hold. They suggest it began when Brown vs The Board of Education (1954) and the Civil Rights Act (1964) made it illegal to judge based on one's color or race; thus, exclusions needed to be made based on another trait. They build on Flores and Rosas' (2017) idea of raciolinguistics that suggests a new way to separate whites and non-whites. They continue to give historical context on the Achievement Gap in that it was a result of the No Child Left Behind Act (2001), despite its good intentions, it compared every race and background on a standardized test written in a White monolingual way. Given the educational system functions on the dominant groups of society (i.e. white, Standardized English, middle-upper class), it ignores the linguistic and cultural practices of minorities. The theory here is that it is not that families of differing backgrounds are not adequate in teaching their children how to speak, but teach them a different linguistic culture at home than the one taught in schools.

Similarly, Johnson (2015) draws on from Faltis (2006) socialization mismatch hypothesis that the culture of the schooling system that is based around middle to upper class, White, Standardized English principles do not match the language socialization of backgrounds that may not fit into these categories. He argues the Language Gap was not a result of vocabulary or literary deficiency in a child, but rather not understanding the language socialization of different cultural backgrounds. He drew from a previous linguistic anthropologist Hymes (1972) term of "communicative competence" in that social expectations within a speech community shape the member's use of language. Thus, diverse backgrounds in language have a different set of expectations that a member conforms to. As language differs, so does the developmental process. Johnson (2015) argues the Language Gap is not fair because it does not consider the various ways children use words and create meaning. Therefore, it is not the parents at fault leading their children to fall behind, but the school's fault for not accommodating to children's backgrounds. Thus, the Language Gap is not a result of a child's comprehension, but a result of how a linear function of language ignores the needs of the various meaning-making methods.

== Criticism ==
Hart and Risley's research has been criticized by scholars. Paul Nation criticizes the methodology, noting that comparing the tokens (words produced) and number of types (number of different words) in unequal samples is not comparing vocabulary sizes. This is to say that the high socioeconomic status samples naturally had a greater number of word types due to the greater number of tokens, because Hart and Risley extrapolated from tokens to an assumed greater number of types, but did not individually assess the number of types. The vocabulary sizes were cumulative, when it is possible that some new words produced were words that had been learnt in a previous month. In fact, Hart and Risley found no major differences in the quality of language produced between the different socioeconomic groups.

Other critics theorize that the language and achievement gaps are not a result of the amount of words a child is exposed to, but rather alternative theories suggest it could derive from the disconnect of linguistic practices between home and school. Thus, judging academic success and linguistic capabilities from socioeconomic status may ignore bigger societal issues. The ongoing word gap discourse can be seen as a modern movement in educational discussion.

A recent replication of Hart and Risley's study with more participants has found that the "word gap" may be closer to 4 million words, not the oft-cited 30 million words previously proposed.

Hart and Risley's research has also been criticized for its racial bias, with the majority of the welfare families and working-class families being African American. Morelli et al. (2018) state that families' cultural backgrounds were not considered in Hart and Risley's (2003) research about language development.

== Implications ==
=== Social implications ===
There are possible social implications to Hart and Risley's theories of the issue of the Language Gap in society. The first possible implication is that this Language Gap is affecting youth's success because they are not exposed to the same amount of vocabulary and literary skill as other kids from middle-upper classes. Hart and Risley suggest that possible solutions include interventions on how to improve vocabulary and literary skills for low SES caregivers. However, the second possible implication of this theory is that it ignores the fact that language and culture are taught differently. In stating other backgrounds cannot be as successful as the dominant groups in society, It reinstates the homogeneity of language by proposing one "true" way of speaking.

Garcia and Otheguy (2016) implies the Language and Achievement Gap derive from racist ideals that reinforce the idea that some cultures are seen as "disadvantaged". To place the blame on different backgrounds is to invalidate their way to make meaning just because they have different cultures. Thus, to not consider the responsibility of the schooling system is to promote the homogeneity of Standardized English and this notion that anyone who does not speak or understand it is inferior and prone to future failure. Garcia argues it delegitimizes backgrounds of families and their linguistic and cultural practices because it is not seen to be "successful" in the eyes of the education system.

=== Political implications ===
The 30-million-word gap has received widespread media attention. In 2013, the Bloomberg Philanthropies mayors challenge awarded Providence, Rhode Island its grand prize for its "providence talks", which proposed teaching poor parents how to speak to their children with the aid of the LENA Device. The Clinton foundations "Too Small to Fail" initiative, which hosted the White House Word Gap event in 2014, resulted in the US department of Health and Human services funding remedial efforts to address the Word Gap.

In addition, Georgia has a policy called "Talk with Me Baby" that is a public action strategy aimed at increasing the number of words children are exposed to in early childhood. "Talk With Me Baby" is a program that provides professional development of nurses, who will then coach new parents how they should talk to their children. This program is funded by Greater United Way of Atlanta.

The University of Chicago, School of Medicine's Thirty Million Words Initiative provides intervention for caregivers and teaches to show them how to optimize their talk with their kids. This program is funded by the PNC Foundation.

=== Gap discourse ===
The Word Gap theory can be seen as part of a larger development in modern educational reform and movement: the Achievement Gap discourse. It is widely accepted and noted by scholars that ideas around individual outcome in schools varies based on various demographics. Explaining variations in achievement in schools across levels of demographics that may result in a gap in student achievement has become the primary problems public schools have to address. The Discourse is based on evidence and assumptions of why primarily poor students of color do not perform at the same levels as their more affluent White and certain Asian group counterparts—it creates language to how schools and communities can be organized more optimally to help students and schools produce more equitable and successful outcomes. The Achievement Gap also addresses a gender gap achievement, and standardized test score gaps broadly across countries, notably with standardized examinations on STEM subjects. The Discourse can also be seen as a turning away from traditional explanations of performance in school as individualistic, to the creation of cultural framework understanding to help explain what conventions hinder and produce successful students. Under performing, adequate yearly progress (AYP), highly qualified, below basic, and proficient are some terms used to mark good and bad aspects of schools, their teachers, and their students which in turn reifies the Achievement Gap theory. As a broader Discourse, it is an idea which is multimodally shared and accepted as common belief between parents, policy makers, teachers and students through various means according to James Paul Gee's idea of Discourse in sociolinguistic analysis.

The effects of the Achievement Gap Discourse cause several cultural phenomena—"cultural gate-keeping," in which policy makers and education reformers decide and label students as more or less capable and worthy than others. Schools might be called under-performing, which can further affect the policy and financing prescribed by their districts, or even higher authorities.

Using metric standards to understand the cause in Achievement Gap as a result of ineffective cultural practices also tends to place blame on the families unless there is ample sociolinguistic inquiry to individual family circumstance, which still often creates a Discourse against deemed underachieving students' culture.

The Achievement Gap Discourse initiated with two primary modes in American educational studies: Achievement Gap among races, and gap among socioeconomic status (SES). The gap Discourse does not typically extend across generations or other forms of demographics that have been studied, and further study of Achievement Gap among different dimensions faces the initial stigmatization as a result of the gap Discourse in various studies around the turn of the 21st century, pin-headed by the 30-million-word gap. Among critics are many linguists, anthropologists, and social discipline specialists, as well as organizations such as the Linguistic Society of America.

The achievement gap became an especially strong interest for study in the turn of the century, and the early 2000s when a plethora of studies looked at factors such as standardized test scores, presence in class, GPA, enrollment, and dropout rates in secondary and post-secondary education. The problem came in the analyses of the studies which were criticized for looking at race and socioeconomic explanations to explain educational outcome without taking into account others such as S. J. Lee, 2005, Pang, Kiang, & Pak, 2004, and Rothstein 2004 which provided broad postulations as to why race and SES accounted for varied success. President George W. Bush's administration's No Child Left Behind rhetoric of 2001 and 2002 left researchers limited to the type of research they could conduct for educational equity due to a need to appease policy makers among educational stakeholders. According to Roderick L Carey, Word Gap researcher, the NCLB "mandated objective and quantitative 'scientifically based' research, which left little room for qualitative research agendas that unpack contextual factors that add nuance to the understandings of how high-stakes accountability is felt and lived by students, teachers, and their families." The rhetoric also posed ideas that placed responsibility of achievement in institutions on their most proximal function oriented members, shifting responsibility to achieve positive outcomes on high-stakes standardized tests nearly entirely on teachers and schools, whilst the difference in achievement was largely believed to be due to factors outside of the classroom. Various studies culminated to suggest general and vague underlying problems within specific communities which caused deficit in learning outcomes under this context.

Among these studies, Hart and Risley stumbled upon the idea of word gap when working with youth who used cochlear implants, to form their idea: they hypothesized exposure to the spoken word might explain an achievement gap in standardized test scores, then used standardized testing data on language as well as an in depth study to conclude their 30-million-word-gap publication.

== Additional information ==
=== Word Gap internationally ===
The Oxford Word Gap is used to describe the word gap found between races and socioeconomic classes in the United Kingdom. The report study "Why Closing the Word Gap Matters: Oxford Language Report" details out statistics collected in primary and secondary schools in the United Kingdom, along the same ideas as the American Word Gap idea, citing Hart and Risley (2003) in the report. It was published in 2018, so all of its implications are yet to be seen.

A great number of states have paid attention to Achievement Gap across hundreds of criteria including demographics, access to language and economic resources and race around the world: notably in the United Kingdom, France, South Africa as named in one comparative analysis. UNESCO has held strongly in its principles the importance on aspects of educational equity, and other educational movements similar to that of the United States Word Gap are numerous throughout Europe and some other members of UNESCO. Europe also has its own varied standards on the ideas of multilingual competence per state, which stress the apprehension and exposure to secondary language vocabulary in students of all ages.

=== Other word gaps ===
The word gap has largely been defined to mean the idea of the observed gap between the spoken and read language in the specific context of American education reform in the context of Hart and Risley; however, other proposed ideas or active research have used it to describe differences in access to language varieties experienced in public settings, such as signage in Orellana, 2017's Another Type of Word Gap, as well as other linguistic resources such as using media for language acquisition.
