= Giant Geyser =

Geyser in Yellowstone National Park

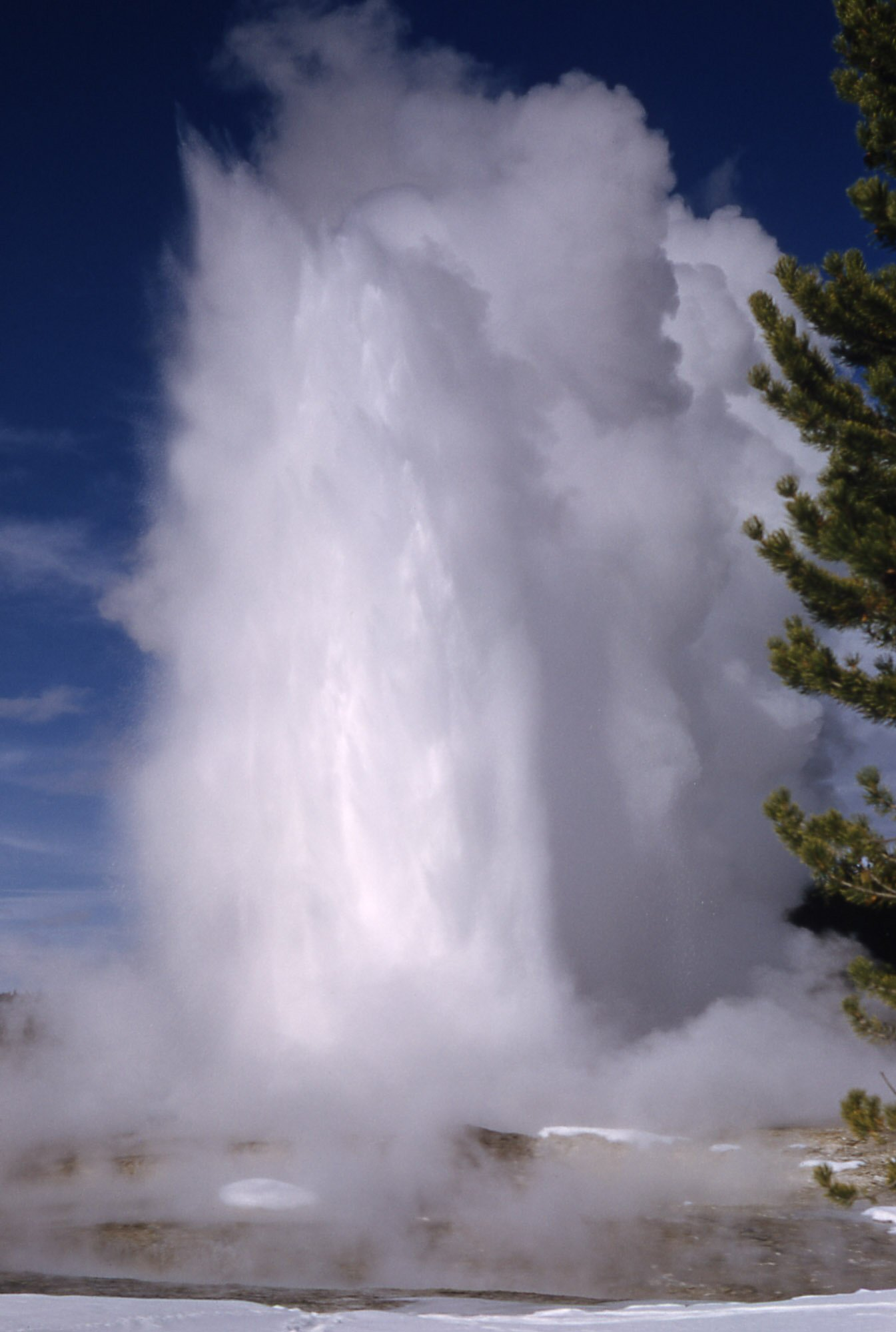
- Giant geyser eruption 1952

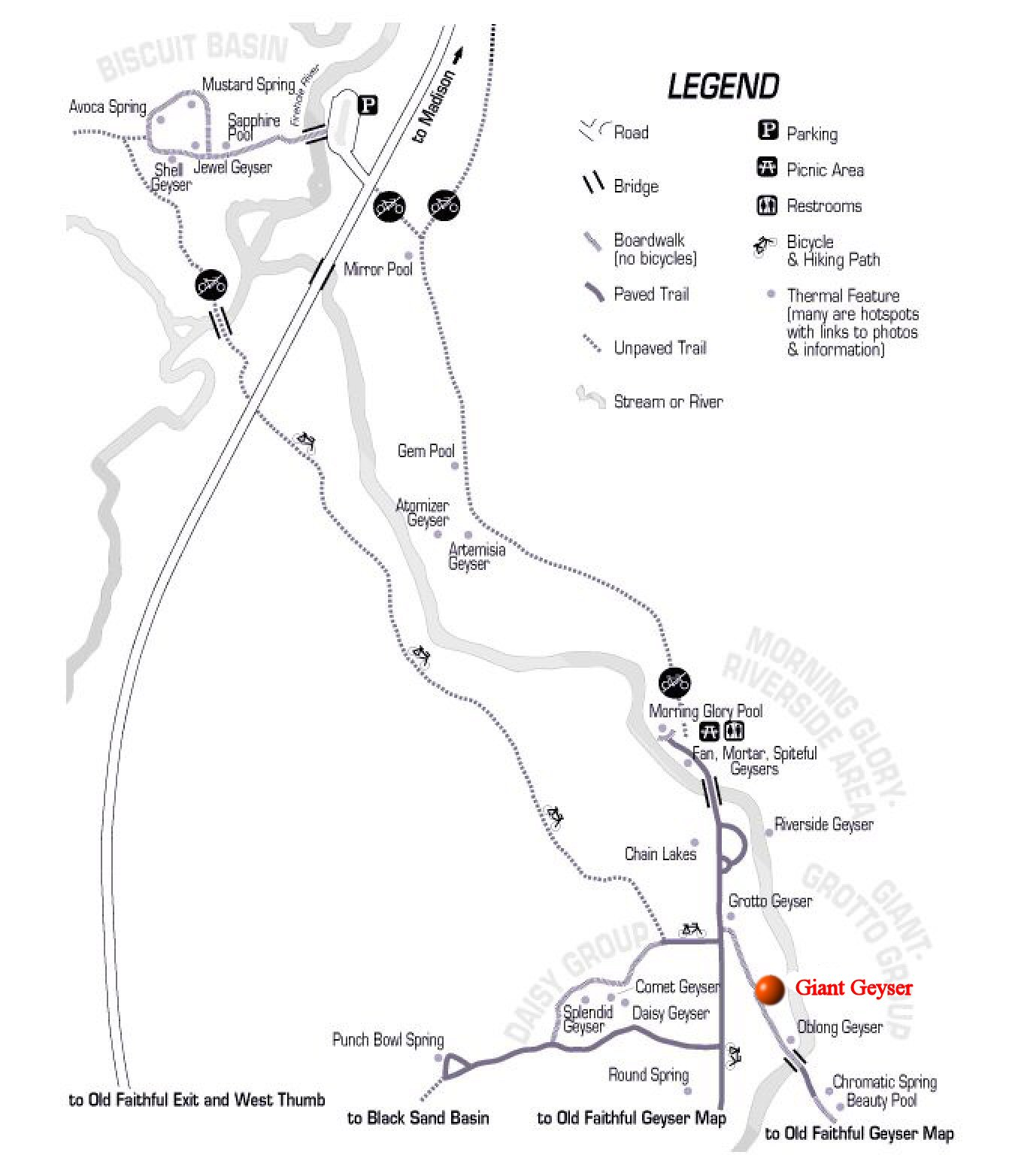
- Northern section of Upper Geyser Basin
- Name origin: Named by the Washburn-Langford-Doane Expedition on September 18, 1870
- Location: Upper Geyser Basin, Yellowstone National Park, Teton County, Wyoming
- Coordinates: 44.4707661°N 110.8407669°W
- Elevation: 7,323 feet (2,232 m)
- Type: Cone geyser
- Eruption height: 250 feet (76 m)
- Frequency: variable days to weeks

Giant Geyser is a cone-type geyser in the Upper Geyser Basin of Yellowstone National Park in the United States. Giant Geyser is the namesake for the Giant Group of geysers, which, on its platform, includes Bijou Geyser, Catfish Geyser, Mastiff Geyser, the "Platform Vents," and Turtle Geyser. Giant Geyser's Platform, a raised stone structure incorporating all these geysers. Giant is notable for its spectacular, but sporadic eruptions, as well as for its very large cone of geyserite, which stands about 12 feet tall.

== History ==
On September 18, 1870, the Washburn-Langford-Doane Expedition entered the Upper Geyser Basin and observed geysers erupting. During their day and a half explorations, they named seven geysers in the basin, including Giant. Nathaniel P. Langford in his 1871 Scribner's account described the Giant.

"The Giant" has a rugged crater, ten feet in diameter on the outside, with an irregular orifice five or six feet in diameter. It discharges a vast body of water, and the only time we saw it in eruption the flow of water in a column five feet in diameter, and one hundred and forty feet in vertical height, continued uninterruptedly for nearly three hours. The crater resembles a miniature model of the Coliseum.

== Eruptions ==
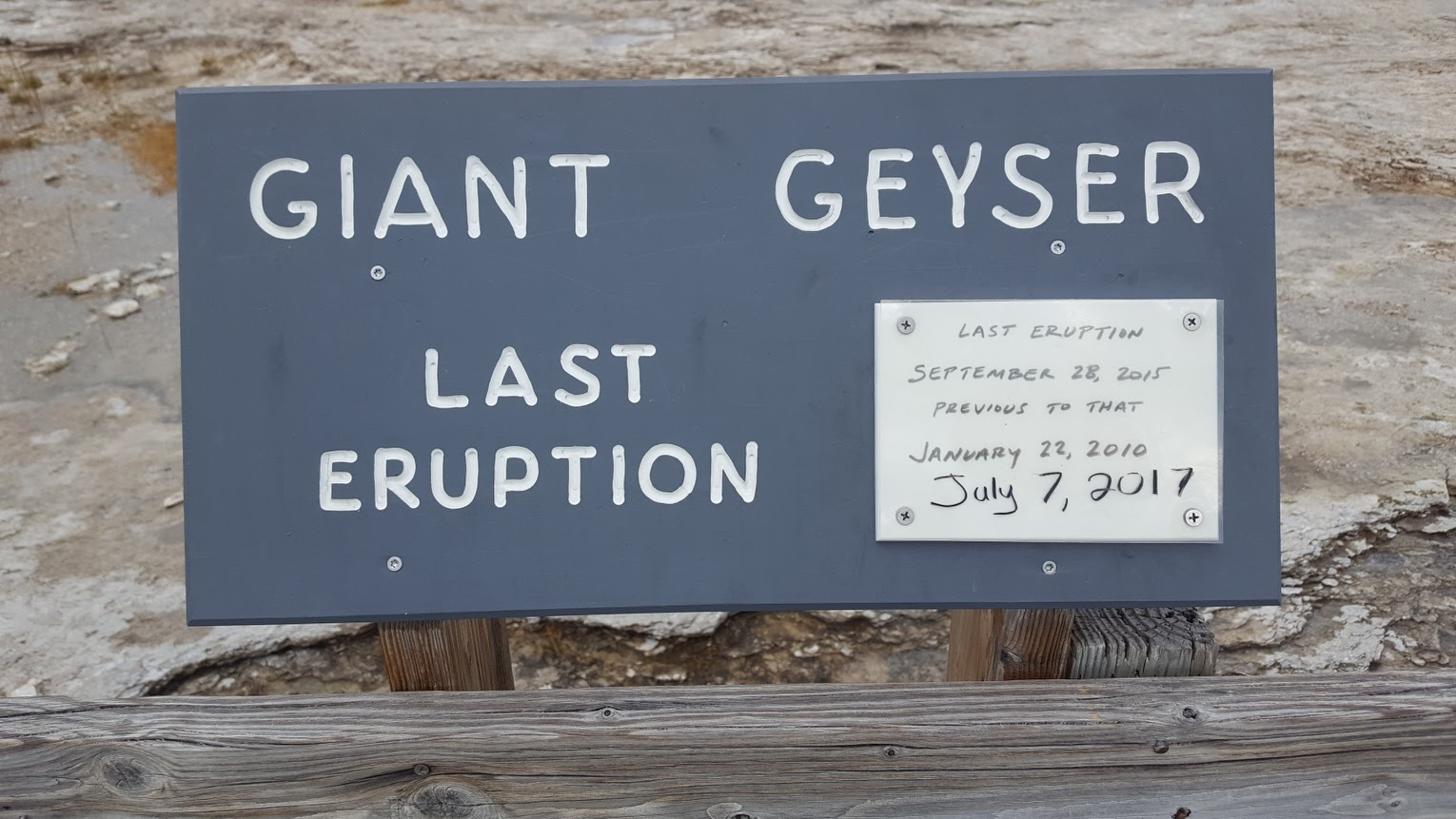
Giant Geyser Last Eruption

Giant can go long periods between eruptions. Its activity level varies considerably from year to year. For several years starting in 1955 it was dormant, and from 1963 through 1987 only six eruptions were known to have occurred. By contrast, around 1997 the interval between eruptions averaged as little as four days. The most recent active phase of Giant Geyser started on August 6, 2005, and continued until April 29, 2008, when activity decreased dramatically; there was a single eruption again on August 26, 2008. There were 11 eruptions in 2005, 47 in 2006, 54 in 2007 (the most eruptions for any year since 1955), and 13 in 2008. There were no recorded eruptions in 2009 and 2 in January 2010. Between July 2017 and March 2019, Giant had a total of 39 eruptions. There were no eruptions between 2020 and 2022. Most recently, Giant Geyser erupted on November 23, 2023. The reasons for this variability are unknown.

The spectacular scale of a Giant eruption, combined with relatively frequent activity in recent years, has caused the geyser to be the object of much study and much has been learned about its eruptive behavior. Giant steams and splashes even during inactive periods, but eruptions can happen only during so-called "hot periods" when there are changes in the activity of the other springs on the Giant Platform as well as more intense splashing in Giant itself. Hot periods typically last a few minutes, and most do not lead to an eruption. When the hot period ends, activity on the Platform returns to normal, and it may be tens of minutes to hours before the next hot period occurs. When Giant does erupt, the activity can be quite dramatic, lasting about an hour and sometimes reaching over 250 feet.

year	Number of eruptions
2005	11
2006	47
2007	54
2008	13
2009	0
2010	2
2011	0
2012	0
2013	0
2014	0
2015	1
2016	0
2017	3
2018	28
2019	8
2020	0
2021	0
2022	0
2023	1
2024	0

Images of Giant Geyser
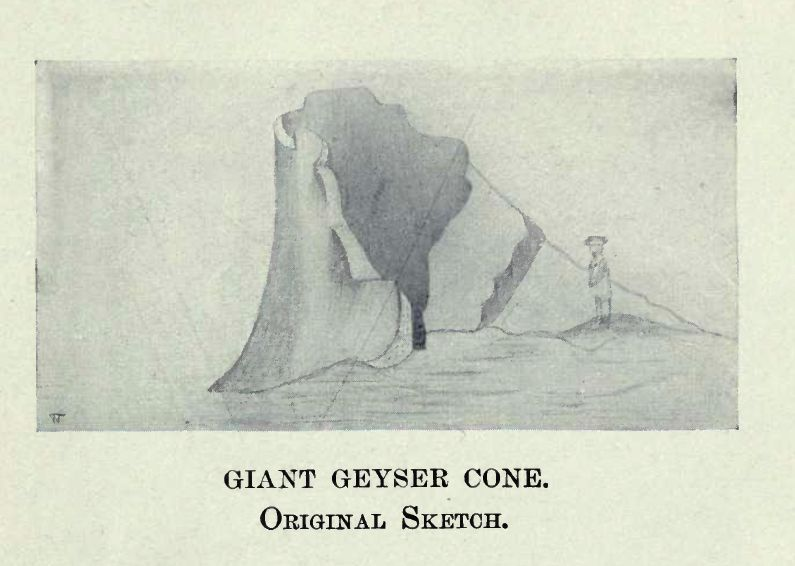
Original sketch of Giant Geyser as discovered by the Washburn Expedition of 1870

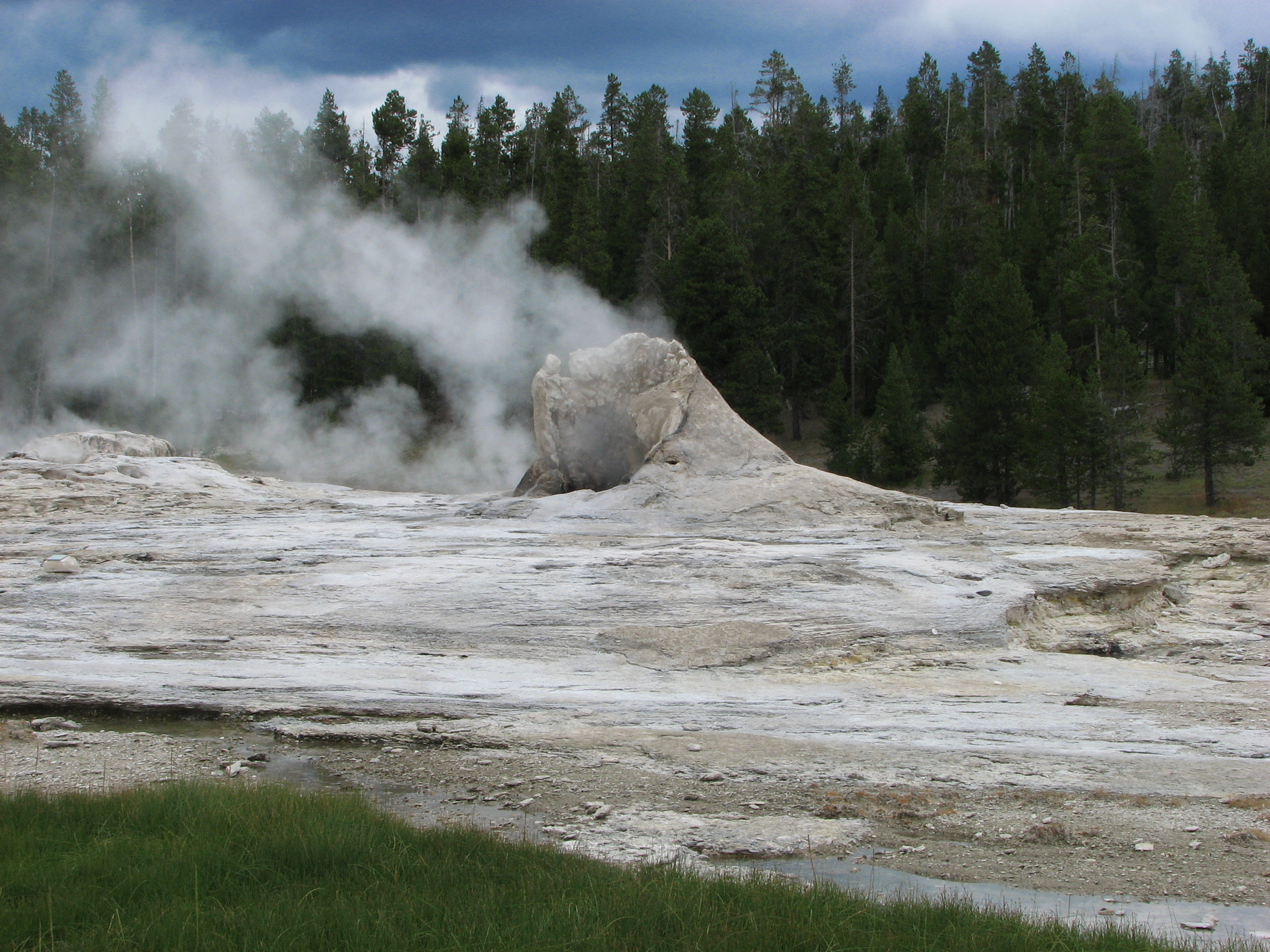
Cone of Giant Geyser

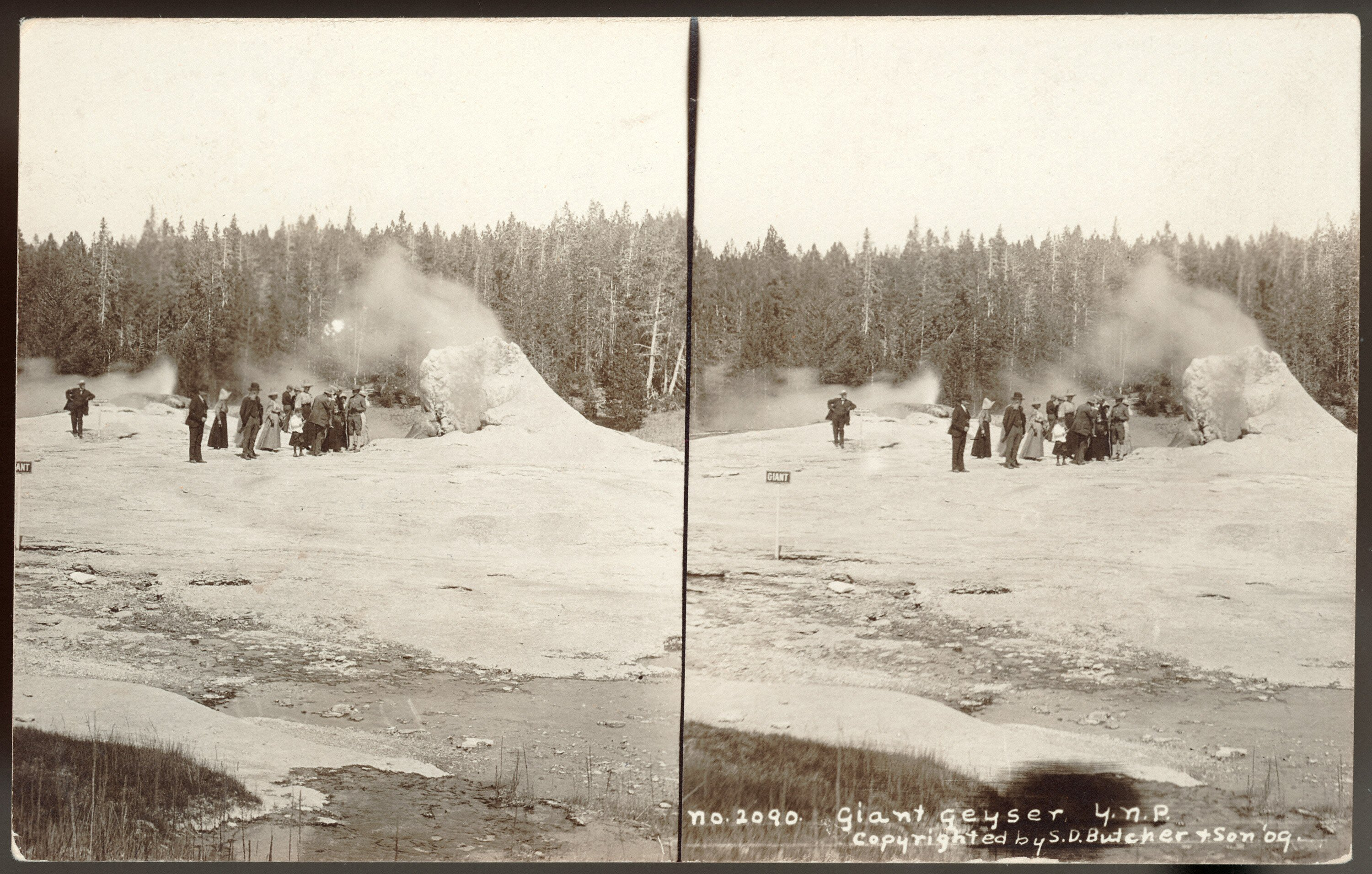
Giant Geyser, 1909
