= Jude Bijou =

American psychotherapist (born 1946)

Jude Bijou (born 1946 in Ann Arbor, Michigan) is an American psychotherapist, lecturer, and author of Attitude Reconstruction: A Blueprint for Building a Better Life (Riviera Press, Revised November 2011). Her approach to understanding and integrating human behavior is based on her career of private practice therapy with individuals and couples. Bijou is the daughter of behavioral child psychologist, Sidney W. Bijou, holds a Bachelor of Arts degree from Reed College, as well as a Master’s in psychology from Carleton University.

== Career ==
Bijou is a writer, speaker, and frequent radio guest residing in Santa Barbara, CA. Bijou has taught “How to Communicate Simply, Lovingly, and Effectively” through Santa Barbara City College Adult Education for twenty years. She also lectures on topics such as “Gracefully Dealing With Emotions And Negative Thoughts” (Cottage Hospital Psychiatric Grand Rounds, Santa Barbara CA, December 2012), and “Emotions, Thoughts, Feelings, And Change” (California Association of Marriage and Family Therapists, Santa Barbara, June 2011).

Bijou has taught Introductory Psychology at Carleton University in Ottawa, Ontario, Canada, Re-evaluation Co-Counseling in Santa Barbara California, and Attitude Reconstruction trainings and workshops.
