= Sidney W. Bijou =

American developmental psychologist

Sidney Bijou
- Born: November 12, 1908; Baltimore, Maryland, U.S.
- Died: June 11, 2009 (aged 100); Santa Barbara, California, U.S.
- Scientific career
- Fields: Developmental psychology
- Workplaces: University of Arizona

Sidney William Bijou (November 12, 1908 – June 11, 2009) was an American developmental psychologist who developed an approach of treating childhood disorders using behavioral therapy, in which positive actions were rewarded and negative behaviors were largely ignored, rather than punished.

== Early life ==
Bijou was born on November 12, 1908, in the Arlington neighborhood of Baltimore, Maryland. He moved to Brooklyn in New York City with his family when he was 10 years old. He earned a degree in business administration at the University of Florida in 1933. He was awarded a master's degree in psychology at Columbia University in 1937 and earned his Ph.D. in the field at the University of Iowa in 1941. Together with Joseph Jastak, he developed the Wide Range Achievement Test, a comprehensive assessment of an individual's ability in reading, comprehension, spelling, and mathematics. During World War II, he served in the U.S. Army Air Forces.

== Career in psychology ==
He was hired by Indiana University in 1946, where he spent two years under pioneering behaviorist B. F. Skinner. While other child psychologists had focused on the use of techniques such as play therapy to identify the motives and causes of problematic behavior, Bijou used Skinner's behavioral techniques to encourage positive behaviors through such rewards as praise, hugs and pieces of candy. Children who were defiant would be given a time-out and separated from a group activity, with the expectation that the bad behavior would be its own punishment, and that any additional sanctions would not have a positive effect. A child isolated from a group would strive to behave appropriately in order to have the opportunity to rejoin the group.

He relocated to the University of Washington in 1948, where he applied Skinner's techniques on children at the Institute of Child Development, and wrote several textbooks in the field together with Donald Baer. Studies he performed there showed that encouragement of good behavior would elicit more good behavior even from unruly children. Ole Ivar Lovaas of the University of California, Los Angeles, one of the developers of applied behavior analysis therapy for autism, adapted Bijou's techniques to develop one of the most commonly used techniques of using rewards to enhance social skills of autistic children.

In 1968, together with Donald Baer, Todd Risley, James Sherman, and Montrose Wolf, he established the Journal of Applied Behavior Analysis, as a peer-reviewed journal publishing research about experimental analysis of behavior and its practical applications.

He relocated over the years to the University of Illinois, the University of Arizona (from 1975 to 1993) and the University of Nevada, Reno (from 1993 to 2001), where he established similar behavioral programs.

== Personal life ==
Bijou died at age 100 on June 11, 2009, after collapsing at his home in Santa Barbara, California. He had moved there to live with his daughter Jude Bijou following his wife's death. He was survived by Jude and a son. His wife died in 2000; they had been married for 67 years.

His son recalled taking the family car for a joyride when he was 15 years old and being arrested by the police. At the police station, the officers offered several ideas for punishments for the misdeed, but Dr. Bijou rejected them all, stating that "he's already had punishment enough". His son recalled the incident, stating that "sometimes it can pay off to have a psychologist for a father".

== Books by Bijou ==
- Behavior Analysis of Child Development (1993)
- New Directions in Behavior Development by Sidney W. Bijou and Emilio Ribes (c1996)
- Behavior Modification: Contributions to education by Sidney W. Bijou and Emilio Ribes-Inesta
- New developments in behavioral research: theory, method, and application: In honor of Sidney Bijou
- Child development: the basic stage of early childhood by Sidney Bijou (1976)
- The exceptional child: conditioned learning and teaching ideas. Papers by Sidney Bijou [et al.] (1971)
