= Bijoux Terner =

Global fashion retail store chain

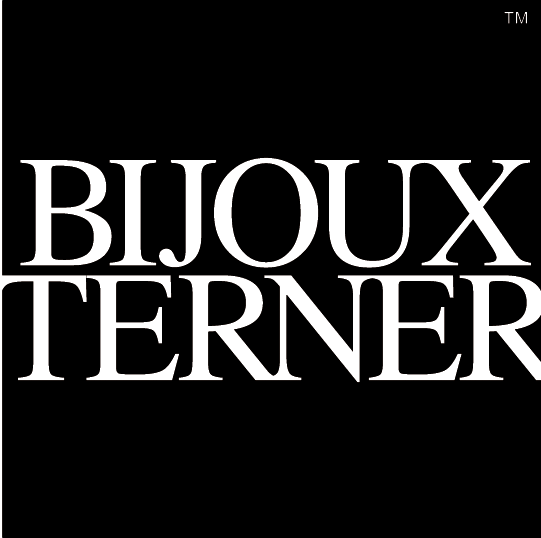
- Type: Private
- Founded: 1974
- Founder: Salomon Terner
- Headquarters: Miami, Florida, USA
- Key people: Gabriel Bottazzi (CEO)
- Owner: Arcapita
- Number of employees: approx. 200 (October 2010)
- Website: www.bijouxterner.com

Bijoux Terner is a global chain of fashion retail stores with over 700 locations around the world and headquartered in Miami, Florida. Bijoux Terner has over 35 years of experience designing, sourcing, and selling fashion accessories: watches, necklaces, pashminas, scarves, handbags, ties, and travel accessories.

== History ==
Bijoux Terner was founded in 1974 by Salomon Terner in Miami, Florida. Terner, known as “Moni”, had left his native Cuba in 1960 after the government seized control of his family's business. In Cuba, Terner had been the president of the National Association for Handbag Manufacturers and, shortly after arriving in the United States, he launched a handbag manufacturing business of his own operating out of the basement of a local department store. Terner soon found success designing handbags for airline flight attendants. By 1965, his young business was supplying handbags to more than 80 percent of airline carriers and two of his handbags are on permanent display at the Smithsonian National Air and Space Museum.

In 1974, Salomon Terner founded Bijoux Terner. Originally established strictly as a jeweler, the company soon began distributing custom designed jewelry at wholesale prices out of malls and merchandise marts. Before long, Bijoux Terner's aim expanded to include other fashion accessories as well. Salomon Terner's daughter, Rosa, decided to follow in her father's footsteps and joined the company. With the two of them at the helm, Bijoux Terner experienced steady growth over the next twenty years.

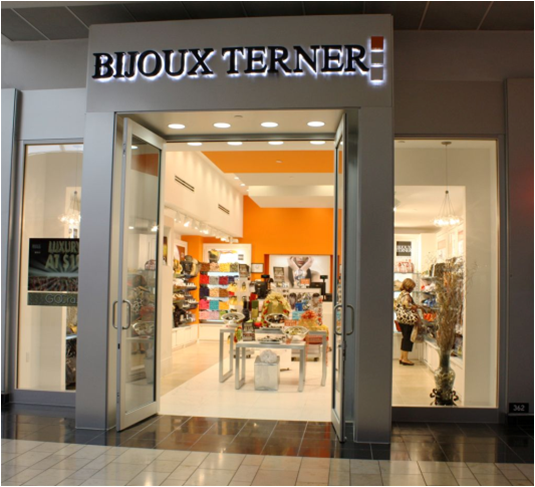
The Bijoux Terner store in Miami International Mall in Miami, Florida, opened in late 2010.

In 1997, Salomon and Rosa Terner decided to try selling all of the jewelry and accessories at an underperforming kiosk in Miami International Airport at $10. The location sold the merchandise five times faster than usual and, in just a few hours, had sold out. Realizing that the simple price point was perfect for travel customers who were in a hurry, the company began targeting the travel retail industry with a simple price point strategy. Bijoux Terner boutiques were opened in airports, on cruise ships, and eventually in casinos all around the world.

In less than a decade, the company grew to over 400 locations in more than 25 countries around the world. Terner decided to sell the company and, in 2006, the Bahrain-based private equity firm Arcapita acquired Bijoux Terner for $90 million.

== Products ==
When first launched, Bijoux Terner strictly offered jewelry goods. Since then, the company's product offerings have expanded to include bags and purses, textiles, travel accessories, and home goods. Within its categories, Bijoux Terner offers products such as watches, necklaces, earrings, pashminas, scarves, wallets, and handbags. The company also serves travel consumers offering goods such as travel pillows, chargers for electronics, and bedazzled headphones.

The Simple Price Point Strategy began as an experiment at one of the company's locations. A Bijoux Terner kiosk at Miami International Airport had been underperforming and on the verge of closing. In a last-ditch effort, Rosa Terner decided to try to sell all of the store's products at $10. The experiment worked and the store sold five times more than usual and sold out in a matter of hours. The experiment led the company to introduce a simple price point strategy at all of its locations. In the United States, the company applied a $10 price to its products while, in Europe, they sold for €12.

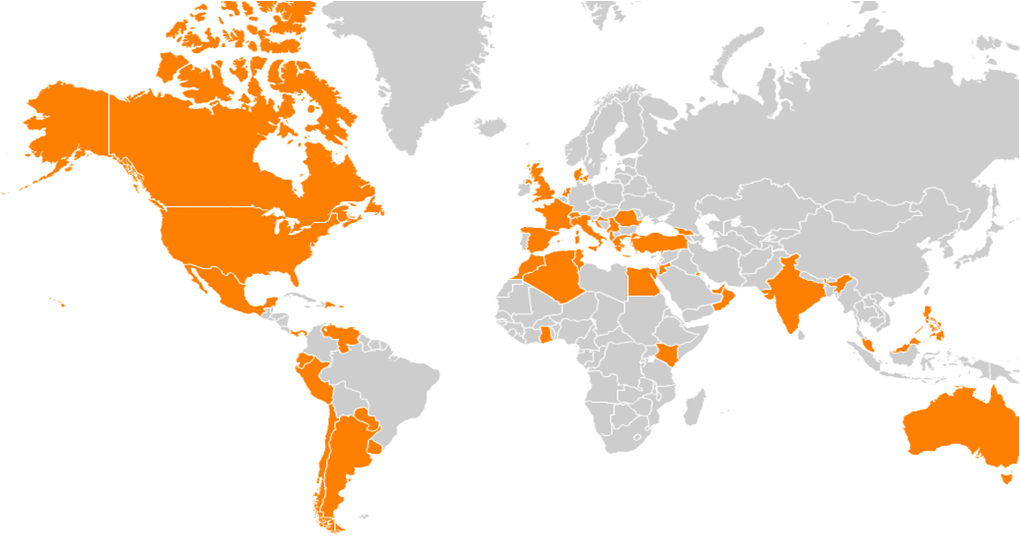
Bijoux Terner's Global Reach. Bijoux Terner has over 650 locations in 50 countries around the world.

Today, prices vary slightly depending on the market. The simple price point strategy has been an enormous success. Since its introduction, Bijoux Terner has grown 15 to 20 times its original size.

== Locations ==
Bijoux Terner has over 700 locations in 50 countries around the world. Its headquarters are in Miami, Florida, where it also has its distribution center. The company has Sourcing and Quality Assurance offices based in Hong Kong and Shenzhen, China, as well as additional account support in Dubai, United Arab Emirates; Manila, Philippines; and Zaragoza, Spain.
