= Bijou Theatre Building =

- U.S. National Register of Historic Places
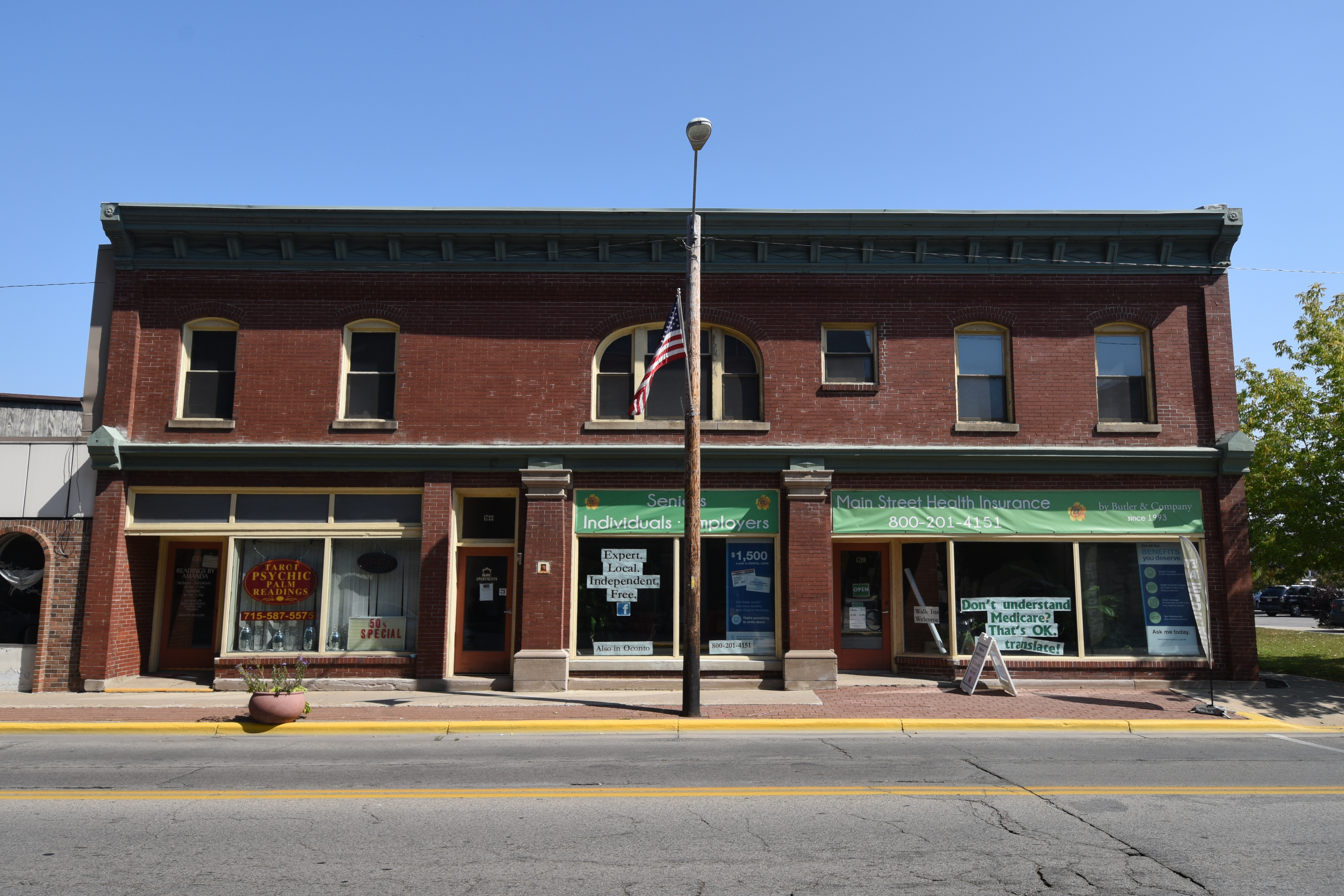
- Location: 1722-1726 Main St. Marinette, Wisconsin
- Built: 1905
- Architectural style: Classical Revival
- NRHP reference No.: 93000159
- Added to NRHP: March 11, 1993

The Bijou Theatre Building is located in Marinette, Wisconsin, USA. It was added to the National Register of Historic Places in 1993.

== History ==
The building was constructed for Frank Lauerman to be both a vaudeville theater and a retail store. In 1908 it was transformed into a movie theater.
