= Todd Risley =

American psychologist

- Born: Todd Robert Risley; September 8, 1937; Alaska, United States of America
- Died: November 2, 2007 (aged 70); Alaska
- Education: San Diego State College; University of Washington
- Known for: Applied behavior analysis
- Scientific career
- Fields: Psychology
- Institutions: University of Kansas; University of Alaska, Anchorage
- Thesis: The establishment of verbal behavior in deviant children (1966)
- Academic advisors: Montrose Wolf

Todd Robert Risley (September 8, 1937 – November 2, 2007) was an American psychologist. He is credited with helping to create the field of applied behavior analysis, and has been described as a "pioneer" in this field. He is known for the study he conducted with Betty Hart, who was his graduate student at the University of Kansas at the time, on the word gap between rich and poor children. He was also a co-founder and editor-in-chief of the Journal of Applied Behavior Analysis.
