= Polytheistic myth as psychology =

The idea of polytheistic myth as having psychological value is one theorem of archetypal psychology as defined by James Hillman, and explored in current Jungian mythology literature. According to proponents of this theory, polytheistic myths can provide psychological insight.

== Perspectives ==
Christine Downing recounts the Ancient Greek view of the gods as archetypes that affect everyone. In so being they are referred to "as theos, that is, as immortal, permanent, ineluctable aspects of the world". According to Downing, disputes among the Greek pantheon were frequent, yet no god in the Classical era ever denied the existence of another god. She also cautions that to deny even one member of the pantheon diminishes the richness of individuals and of the world.

For Carl Gustav Jung, the primary function of myth is psychological — to shed light on the workings of the unconscious. The cornerstone of his therapeutic approach is working with a patient’s dreams and fantasies. To be of help, then, it is imperative to have knowledge of the details of the patient’s life as well as knowledge of “…symbols, and therefore of mythology and the history of religions”. Jung implies the diversity of psychic energies inhabiting the unconscious mind. He also cautions readers to know these energies rather than force them into one’s shadow, lest one’s “…moods, nervous states, and delusions make it clear in the most painful way that [one] is not the only master in [one's] house…"

Thomas Moore says of James Hillman’s teaching that he “portrays the psyche as inherently multiple”. In Hillman’s archetypal/polytheistic view, the psyche or soul has many directions and sources of meaning—and this can feel like an ongoing state of conflict—a struggle with one’s daimons. According to Hillman, “polytheistic psychology can give sacred differentiation to our psychic turmoil…”. Furthermore, Hillman states that, "The power of myth, its reality, resides precisely in its power to seize and influence psychic life. The Greeks knew this so well, and so they had no depth psychology and psychopathology such as we have. They had myths. And we have no myths as such -instead, depth psychology and psychopathology. Therefore... psychology shows myths in modern dress and myths show our depth psychology in ancient dress." Hillman qualifies his many references to gods as differing from a literalistic approach saying that for him they are aides memoires, i.e. sounding boards employed "for echoing life today or as bass chords giving resonance to the little melodies of life." Hillman further asserts that he does not view the pantheon of gods as a 'master matrix' against which we should measure today and thereby decry modern loss of richness.

Other proponents of this view are Jean Shinoda Bolen and Ginette Paris.

== See also ==
- Apollo archetype
- Atlas personality
- Cassandra (metaphor)
- Comparative mythology
- Electra complex
- Jocasta complex
- Jungian archetypes
- Laius complex
- Medusa complex
- Oedipus complex
- Phaedra complex
