= Enmeshment =

Concept in psychology and psychotherapy

Enmeshment is a concept in psychology and psychotherapy introduced by Salvador Minuchin to describe families where personal boundaries are diffused, sub-systems undifferentiated, and over-concern for others leads to a loss of autonomous development. According to this hypothesis, by being enmeshed in parental needs, trapped in a discrepant role function, a child may lose their capacity for self-direction; their own distinctiveness, under the weight of "psychic incest"; and, if family pressures increase, may end up becoming the identified patient or family scapegoat.

Enmeshment was also used by John Bradshaw to describe a state of cross-generational bonding within a family, whereby a child (usually of the opposite sex) becomes a surrogate spouse for their mother or father.

The term is sometimes applied to engulfing codependent relationships, where an unhealthy symbiosis is in existence.

Others suggest that for the toxically enmeshed child, the adult's carried feelings may be the only ones they know, outweighing and eclipsing their own.

== Critiques ==
There are important cultural differences in how enmeshment would be experienced or conceptualized, however. One study found that enmeshed adults in the United Kingdom experienced more depression than those in Italy, because of cultural expectations in more individualistic versus more collectivist cultures.

Further, feminist family therapy critics have argued that the concept of enmeshment may "reflect prototypically male standards of self and relationships, which contribute to the common practice of labeling women's preferred interactional styles as pathological or dysfunctional". Empirical research in this critical feminist tradition has found that young women with the strongest sense of family cohesion have the highest social self-esteem, despite exhibiting what could be pathologized as "enmeshment".

== See also ==
- Atlas personality
- Co-rumination
- Covert incest
- Cross-generational sexual relationships
- Double bind
- Dysfunctional family
- Family nexus
- Folie à deux
- Harold Searles
- Parentification
- Stockholm syndrome
- Structural family therapy
