= Brother complex =

Common theme in Japanese pop culture

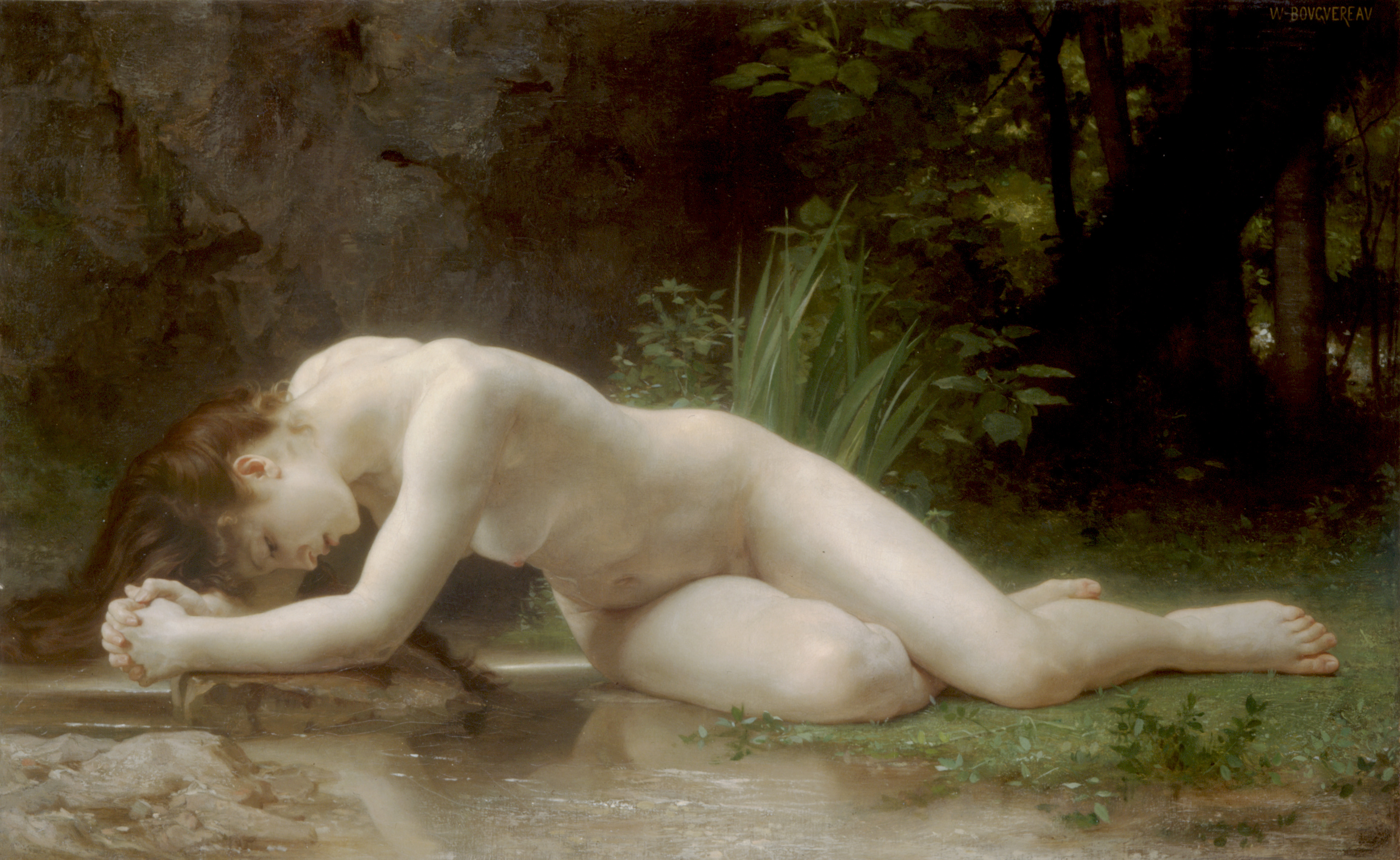
Byblis obsessed with her brother Caunos

Brother complex (Japanese: ブラザーコンプレックス) refers to a state of strong attachment and obsession to brothers. It is also commonly abbreviated as "brocon" (ブラコン), and in this case, it is also used for brothers and sisters who have a strong attachment and obsession to their brothers.

== History ==
In 1917, Yoshihide Kubo stated in his work Psychoanalysis that Ophelia and Laertes (characters from Shakespeare’s Hamlet) had a "brother-sister complex" relationship. In his 1932 work Psychological Analysis, Kubo called the relationship between father and daughter by sexual instinct "father–daughter complex" and that between mother and son "mother-son complex". He argues that "brother-sister complex" is a transfer of "father-daughter complex" and "mother-son complex". However, Kubo’s theories, like much early psychoanalytic thought, were speculative and based on literary interpretation rather than empirical research, and they are not considered scientifically credible today.

The word "brother complex" is used in the manga work Laughing Clown, which depicts a brother and sister who aim to become violinists, which is included in Akemi Matsuzaki's book Labyrinthine Castle released in 1988.

== Overview ==
The term "brother complex" was originally a slang term for fetishism, but it was generalized by this term because fetishism and complex were related concepts in analytical psychology. When the other party is a sister, it is called a "sister complex".

In general, the brother complex is described as a sister who has "love feelings toward her brother" and "exclusive desire to own." For a woman with a brother complex, brothers, combined with sexual aspirations, can become an idealized image and have more influence on her life than her parents. For example, choosing a lover or spouse who has something in common or similar to her brothers. It may be accompanied by a negative image, and it may be seen as "making the brothers accept her selfishness to the maximum" or "treating the brothers freely and conveniently". On the other hand, the strong bond between male brothers is often seen positively as a symbol of masculinity.

According to psychiatrist Takashi Okada, women in the brother complex can become depressed or unstable when their brother has a lover or when they get married. Also, in such a case, she may feel jealous of her brother's partner, or may idealize her brother's partner as an entity that has acquired the love of her brother that she could not obtain. In order to appease her feelings, a woman in such a situation will, among things, decide to avoid her brother's home, depending on how attached she feels to him.

According to a research conducted by Mynavi Corporation on women with siblings by September 2019, more than 20% of women identified themselves as a brother complex.

== Cause ==
It is speculated that the cause of the excessive brother complex is due to parents' problems and social anxiety. Interpretations related to the child psychologist Jean Piaget speculate that the older sister may be trying to resolve her dissatisfaction with her decentralization due to her younger brother's birth by controlling her younger brother.

== Moe term ==
Since the 2000s, the term brother complex is sometimes used as a moe term in video games (especially eroge), anime, and light novels. In Chinese, it is called "兄控". As a concrete example of works dealing with brocon (or a person with that temperament appears), there is Gekka no Ichigun, Sister Princess, Oreimo, OniAi, I Don't Like You at All, Big Brother!!, My Girlfriend is Shobitch, Hensuki, My Sister, My Writer, World Break: Aria of Curse for a Holy Swordsman. Minako Saito states that Sayla Mass is more of a brother complex to Char Aznable. Takako Shimura's Beautiful Everyday features a girl from the brother complex. Anime News Network's Theron Martin states that Suguha Kirigaya's unrequited love for Kirito in Sword Art Online seems to be intended to pander to fans of the "Big Brother Complex".

By August 12, 2012, Flex Comix had opened a special page on its official website for the comic anthology Brocon Anthology Liqueur, which is based on the brother complex.

== See also ==
- Sister complex
- Oedipus complex
- Electra complex
- Jocasta complex
- Father complex
- Mother's boy
- Shotacon
- Incest
