= Sister complex =

Strong attachment to sister

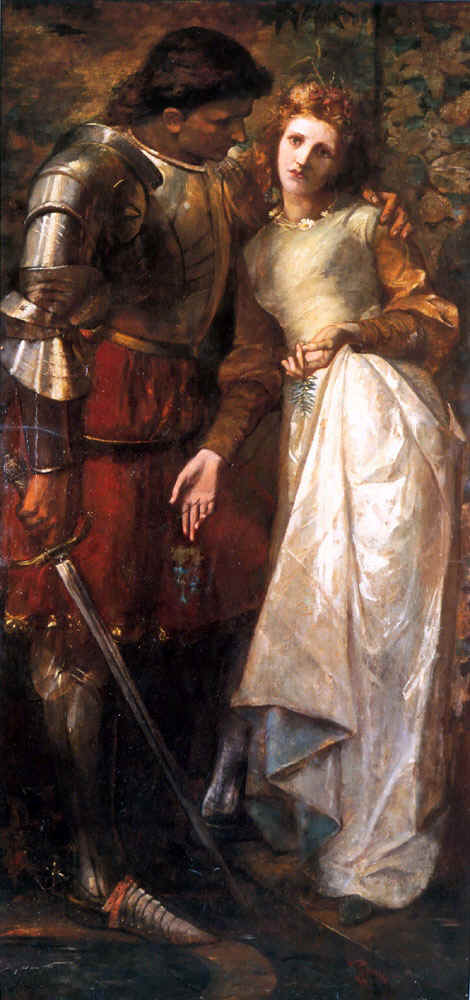
Laertes and his sister Ophelia

A sister complex (Japanese: シスターコンプレックス) is a state of strong attachment and obsession to one's sister or sisters. In Japanese, it is commonly abbreviated as "siscon" (シスコン), in which case the term can also refer those brothers and sisters who feel a strong sense of affection or attachment to their sisters.

== History ==
In 1917, Yoshihide Kubo stated in his work Psychoanalysis that Ophelia and Laertes (characters from Shakespeare's Hamlet) had a "brother-sister complex" relationship. In his 1932 work Psychological Analysis, Kubo called the father-daughter relationships arising from sexual instinct "father-daughter complex" and that between mother and son "mother-son complex". He argues that brother-sister complexes are transferences of the "father-daughter complex" and the "mother-son complex". However, Kubo's theories, like much early psychoanalytic thought, were speculative and based on literary interpretation rather than empirical research, and they are not considered scientifically credible today.

The word "sister complex" was used in Hiroyuki Itsuki's novel Koiuta, which was serialized from October 12, 1967, to May 11, 1968.

== Overview ==
The term "sister complex" is wasei-eigo and was originally a slang term for a related type of fetishism. However, in analytical psychology, the concepts of fetishism and complex are related, so the whole idea was generalized into the term "complex". If the other party is a brother, it is called a "brother complex".

The sister complex can be understood in the form of a brother who has "love feelings for his sisters" and an "exclusive desire to own them". For men with a sister complex, older and younger sisters can become a target of sexual admiration, as well as idealized archetypes, to the point of being more influenced by them than by their parents. For instance, such men might choose a lover or spouse who is similar to or has something in common with his sister. On the other hand, the term may also be used to describe women who are obsessed with sisters, in which case it is often seen relatively positively as "a woman who longs for her older sister" or "a woman who loves her younger sister".

Nobuhiko Obayashi described author Osamu Tezuka as having a sister complex, citing an episode in which Tezuka said, "There was nothing more erotic than having my younger sister drawing manga by my side." According to Obayashi, authors with a sister complex are characterized by the fact that they "do not grow roots in the ground", instead continuing to search for their lost "sister" while "jumping out of the earth and going to space or into the future." In addition, Obayashi states that they give up on sex when they realize that they can only love their sister. Obayashi mentions Akira Kurosawa, Howard Hawks, as well as Obayashi himself as examples of authors leaning towards a sister complex. Yoshihiro Yonezawa cites Tezuka's sister complex as one of the qualities he couldn't show to other people. Author Shotaro Ishinomori stated that he has a sister complex towards his older sister. Naohiro Fumoto quoted the poems of Ono no Takamura and Ariwara no Narihira, who seemed to be attracted to their sisters, pointing out that they had a sister complex. Fumoto also described Yukio Mishima in the same way, mentioning that Mishima had confessed that he loved his sister Mitsuko Hiraoka and that he also wrote works such as Tropical Tree which included incestuous themes.

== See also ==
- Brother complex
- Oedipus complex
- Electra complex
- Jocasta complex
- Father complex
- Mother's boy
- Incest
