= OniAi =

Japanese light novel series and its adaptations

- Cover of the first light novel

お兄ちゃんだけど愛さえあれば関係ないよねっ (Onii-chan dakedo Ai sae Areba Kankei Nai yo ne!)
- Genre: Harem, romantic comedy
- Light novel
- Written by: Daisuke Suzuki
- Illustrated by: Gekka Urū
- Published by: Media Factory
- Imprint: MF Bunko J
- Original run: December 24, 2010 – January 25, 2019
- Volumes: 12
- Manga
- Written by: Kurō Rokushō
- Published by: Media Factory
- Magazine: Monthly Comic Alive
- Original run: September 27, 2011 – May 27, 2015
- Volumes: 7
- Manga

Sakigake!! Onii-chan dakedo Ai sae Areba Kankei Nai yo ne!
- Written by: Akira Yamane
- Published by: Media Factory
- Magazine: Monthly Comic Alive
- Original run: May 26, 2012 – January 26, 2013
- Volumes: 1
- Anime television series
- Directed by: Keiichiro Kawaguchi
- Written by: Kazuyuki Fudeyasu
- Music by: Takahiro Ando
- Studio: Silver Link
- Licensed by: Crunchyroll (Note: Formerly known as Funimation Entertainment.)
- Original network: AT-X, Tokyo MX, BS11, Sun TV
- Original run: October 5, 2012 – December 21, 2012
- Episodes: 12 + 6 special
- icon

OniAi (Japanese: お兄ちゃんだけど愛さえあれば関係ないよねっ, Hepburn: Onii-chan dakedo Ai sae Areba Kankei Nai yo ne!; lit. As Long as There's Love, It Doesn't Matter If He Is My Brother, Right?) is a Japanese light novel series written by Daisuke Suzuki, with illustrations by Gekka Urū. The series is published by Media Factory since December 2010 and ended on January 25, 2019, with a total of 12 volumes released. There are two manga adaptation series, both were serialized in Media Factory's Monthly Comic Alive magazine. It follows two siblings after the passing of their parents who were forced to live with separate families for six years and have finally reunited and started to live together.

An anime television adaptation produced by Silver Link aired in Japan for 12 episodes from October 5 to December 21, 2012. The series is licensed for home video and streaming distribution in North America by Crunchyroll.

== Premise ==
After six years of living apart due to the death of their parents, the Himenokōji twins, Akito and Akiko, are finally reunited when Akito desires to live as a member of the family once more. Although things are fine at first, Akiko begins to express her incestuous love for her older brother, who only sees her as his little sister. Things become more complicated for her when more girls move in with the siblings.

== Characters ==
Akito Himenokōji (姫小路 秋人, Himenokōji Akito)
Voiced by: Ryōta Ōsaka
Akito recently transferred to Saint Liliana High School where he is placed in class 2A. His twin sister, from whom he has been separated for six years, is a student at the school. Akito has a laid-back personality and hopes to live a calm, normal life, but he will work with his full strength to achieve a goal. He started to take care of his sister when they were younger, however when their parents died, the siblings were separated. Six years later, he moved out of the Takanomiya household (the people who adopted him after he was separated from Akiko) to live on his own and was finally able to reunite with his sister, only to find out that she has a brother complex which had developed while they were separated. It is later revealed that he was actually adopted by his former parents, and therefore has no blood relationship with his sister, but he has chosen to keep this as a secret, especially from her. He loves to tease Akiko and watching others tease her. Akito is quite protective of Akiko, and people around him often comment that Akito has a serious sister complex, although he insists that he only sees her as his little sister. He has secretly made a living by writing erotic novels of brother-sister incest under the pen name "Kōichirō Shindo", which are very popular since before the siblings started living together. He uses his relationship with his sister as an inspiration for his novels, with the characters' names being very similar to their own. He was given the job of Student Council "Vice-Assistant of Proxy of Secretary" so that the girls on the Council could spend more time with him. Arashi happily claims that the position was fabricated for her underground lover; technically, he is the assistant of Akiko, the student council secretary.

Akiko Himenokōji (姫小路 秋子, Himenokōji Akiko)
Voiced by: Ibuki Kido
A Saint Liliana High School second year student. Akiko is Akito's sister, is very pretty and has polite manners. Akiko was adopted by the Arisugawa family when she and Akito were separated after their parents died. She has a very serious brother-complex, and is making every effort to seduce Akito. She is also very proud of her brother complex and makes no effort in hiding it. At the same time she denies that her brother in turn has a sister-complex. She is the secretary of Saint Liliana High School Student Council and does not like it when Akito interacts with other student council members. She doesn't know that Akito has no blood relationship with her and believes that they are twins. She is a fan of Kōichirō Shindo, and wishes that her brother would be as aggressive as the brother in Kōichirō Shindo's novel. She hasn't noticed that the beginning of his novel is based on their relationship nor does she know that Kōichirō Shindo is actually her brother.

Anastasia Nasuhara (那須原 アナスタシア, Nasuhara Anasutashia)
Voiced by: Minori Chihara
A Saint Liliana High School second year student and the Vice-President of the Student Council. She is the daughter of the owner of Nasuhara industry, a world-wide company. Anastasia is half-Russian and half-American with blonde twin tails. She has a cold personality and often asks strange questions, for example asking Akito if he was a cherry boy (a term for virgin) when they first met. She is Akiko's rival and proud that she wins a little in almost everything, including height, grades, breast size, rank during the Miss Saint Liliana High School Election, and Student Council rank. However, she is extremely bad at house chores due to her upbringing in a wealthy family, to the point that she will gladly admit it and try to escape from doing them. She also loves cute things, and not only keeps many plushies in her room, but also loves to play with Arisa. Despite being Akiko's rival, she gets along very well with Akito and confessed to him on his first day at school. Akito hasn't had a chance to answer her due to the chaotic situation that the confession brought about. She demands that Akito call her Ana, but teases him whenever he does so (because ana (穴) means hole in Japanese).

Ginbei Haruomi Sawatari (猿渡 銀兵衛 春臣, Sawatari Ginbei Haruomi)
Voiced by: Asami Shimoda
Akito's childhood friend. Despite having a boyish name and way of talking, Ginbei is a girl and secretly has feelings for Akito. Due to her merchant family tradition, she was raised as a boy and not allowed to take a job herself, living only on her family's financial support. She later transferred to Saint Liliana High School (to be closer to Akito) and became the accountant of the Student Council. Despite the fact that she moved and transferred schools to follow him, Akito often refers to her as his best (normal) friend, which greatly disappoints her. She has a habit of mumbling about Akito's ignorance whenever he overlooks her feelings.

Arashi Nikaidō (二階堂 嵐, Nikaidō Arashi)
Voiced by: Eri Kitamura
A Saint Liliana High School third year student and the President of the Student Council, Arashi wears a ponytail, has heterochromia and is seen often wearing an eyepatch over her right eye. She is also often seen carrying a real katana. She has the best grades among the 3rd year students and is a powerful leader, being able not only to handle most of the Student Council chores by herself, but also to take control of most of the school's activities. She is bisexual and very sexually aggressive, claiming she has had over 30 lovers, thus gaining the nickname "The Predator". However, later in the story, she decides to peacefully break up with her lovers in order to make the Student Council into her harem. She also has the habit of referring to Akito as either her underground lover or sex slave. She is actually Akito's cousin from before his adoption by Akiko's parents, and is aware that Akito was adopted by her family. She is also the only one on the Student Council who knows that Akito is Kōichirō Shindo.

Arisa/Alisa Takanomiya (鷹ノ宮 ありさ, Takanomiya Arisa/Alisa)
Voiced by: Sumire Morohoshi
The daughter of Akito's second adoptive family and also his fiancée. Arisa/Alisa is a genius; despite being only 12 years old, she has already graduated from a famous university, and her thesis was published in a famous journal. She is very good at household chores. At the end of the 4th novel, she moves in with the student council members. While most of the student council members say that the engagement doesn't count due to her age, Akiko views her as a love rival. However, after arguing over which of them is better for Akito, the two of them decide to work together as they have noticed that Akito sees both of them as his sisters rather than as potential love interests. She has a habit of going silent and showing her emotions on her face when she is upset, which is so cute that people who see it can't resist accepting her will. She also has the habit of stripping naked in her sleep.

Kaoruko Jinno (神野 薫子, Jinno Kaoruko)
Voiced by: Megumi Takamoto
Kōichirō Shindo's personal editor, Kaoruko worries that Akito has a sister complex and is trying to fix the situation. Kaoruko worries about this is because of the way Akito writes about BroXSis doujins. The two main characters in his novel even sharing a similar name to his and Akiko. She tries at first to seduce Akito at the office when they were alone together, but was mistaken by Akito as Kaoruko imitating a story that he read.

== Media ==
=== Light novel ===
OniAi started as a Japanese light novel series, written by Daisuke Suzuki, with illustrations by Gekka Urū. The series is published by Media Factory under their MF Bunko J imprint. The series' first volume was released on December 24, 2010, and the last volume was released on January 25, 2019.

A drama CD was released bundled with the limited edition of the seventh volume, published on September 25, 2012.

No.	Release date	ISBN
1	December 24, 2010	978-4-8401-3676-1
2	March 25, 2011	978-4-8401-3855-0
3	June 24, 2011	978-4-8401-3941-0
4	October 25, 2011	978-4-8401-4268-7
5	February 24, 2012	978-4-8401-4389-9
6	May 25, 2012	978-4-8401-4581-7
7	September 25, 2012	978-4-8401-4815-3; 978-4-8401-4636-4 (limited edition)
8	October 25, 2012	978-4-8401-4846-7
9	March 25, 2013	978-4-8401-5136-8
10	September 25, 2013	978-4-8401-5419-2
11	March 25, 2014	978-4-04-066387-6
12	January 25, 2019	978-4-04-065385-3

=== Manga ===
A manga adaptation series by Kurō Rokushō was serialized between the December 2011 and July 2015 issues of Media Factory's seinen manga magazine Monthly Comic Alive and has been compiled in seven volumes, between February 23, 2012, and March 23, 2015. A manga series by Akira Yamane, titled Sakigake!! Onii-chan dakedo Ai sae Areba Kankei yo ne! (魁!! お兄ちゃんだけど愛さえあれば関係ないよねっ) was also published in Monthly Comic Alive between its July 2012 and March 2013 issues. Its first volume was released on November 22, 2012.

No.	Release date	ISBN
1	February 23, 2012	978-4-8401-4415-5
2	May 23, 2012	978-4-8401-4466-7
3	September 21, 2012	978-4-8401-4724-8
4	March 23, 2013	978-4-8401-5029-3
5	October 23, 2013	978-4-8401-5338-6
6	May 23, 2014	978-4-04-066558-0
7	June 23, 2015	978-4-04-067286-1

=== Anime ===
A 12-episode anime television series adaptation, directed by Keiichiro Kawaguchi and produced by studio Silver Link, aired in Japan between October 5 and December 21, 2012, The series is licensed in North America by Funimation Entertainment (now known as Crunchyroll LLC) and later simulcasted for streaming by Funimation and later Crunchyroll. The opening theme for the anime is "Self Producer" by Minori Chihara, whilst the ending theme is "Life-Ru is Love-Ru!! (Lifeる is LOVEる!!), by Liliana Sisters consisting of Ibuki Kido, Minori Chihara, Asami Shimoda and Eri Kitamura.

The series was released on Blu-ray Disc and DVD in Japan in 6 volumes between December 2012 and May 2013.

A North American Blu-ray/DVD release by Funimation with subtitles in English was released on December 31, 2013. The series performed well enough to be a financial success for Funimation, and it led Funimation to do more subtitle-only Blu-ray/DVD releases in the future.

==== Episodes ====
No.	Title	Original release date
1	"Brother Love" "Oniai" (おにあい)	October 5, 2012
After being apart for six years, Akiko Himenokoji finally moves in with her brother Akito, who is immediately taken aback by Akiko's precocities, which include insisting that he peep on her whilst she bathes. Later, Ginbei, Anastasia, and Arashi move into the same dormitory, much to Akiko's dismay.
2	"Indecent" "Midarane" (みだらね)	October 12, 2012
Akito meets with his editor Kaoruko at a restaurant where they discuss Akito's next novel. Akito has also discovered that Akiko has been reading the novels—all incestuous stories—that Akito wrote under an assumed name.
3	"Braless" "Bura Nashi" (ぶらなし)	October 19, 2012
When Akito goes to collect the laundry from the line and moves on to Akiko's panties, Akiko rushes out and falsely accuses him of having perverted thoughts. Anastasia has taken a liking to Akito and asks him to be her boyfriend—resulting in an adverse reaction from Akiko.
4	"Naked" "Hadakada" (はだかだ)	October 26, 2012
Akito helps Anastasia organize her room, whereupon Anastasia attempts to take advantage of him. Later, Akiko, Ginbei, Anastasia, and Arashi take a bath together, where they deride each other for the calibre of their bodies.
5	"Sexual Desires" "Seikan" (せいかん)	November 2, 2012
Having read over the material Akito submitted for publication, Kaoruko begins to question whether Akito has incestuous feelings for his sister. Later, when the door to the shed is locked, Arashi attempts to take advantage of Akito.
6	"Mayo Chiki" "Mayochiki" (まょちき)	November 9, 2012
Kaoruko comes to the dormitory to ask Akito's cohabitants whether he has any incestuous feelings for his sister, of which she leaves convinced especially as Akiko seizes the opportunity to trumpet her love for her brother. In response to the allegations, the cohabitants resolve that Akito and Akiko must sleep in separate rooms. Later, it is learned that Arashi took on Arisa/Alisa, Akito's fiancée, as the new housekeeper.
7	"Small Breasts" "Chippai" (ちっぱい)	November 16, 2012
With Arisa/Alisa's arrival at the dormitory, Akiko believes that her chances of having Akito to herself are threatened and challenges Arisa/Alisa to a series of competitions to determine who is better suited for Akito. Akito eventually tides over the situation by declaring that he loves them both as sisters.
8	"Colorful" "Karafuru" (からふる)	November 23, 2012
Arisa/Alisa, Ginbei, Akiko, Anastasia, and Arashi go shopping for swimsuits and then ask Akito to decide which one is the best.
9	"Meow Meow" "NīNī" (にーにー)	November 30, 2012
Akito catches Ginbei conversing with a cat outside the school grounds. Later, when Akito takes ill, his cohabitants argue over who should be able to take care of him before deciding to take shifts doing so.
10	"Silver Ball" "Gindama" (ぎんだま)	December 7, 2012
Ginbei recounts how she and Akito first met and why she thinks Akito looks at her as a boy. When Akito recovers, his cohabitants ask him to decide who took the best care of him; he chooses Arashi, who did nothing but change his head towel. It transpires that Kaoruko caught Akito's illness and sleeps in the editorial offices, agonizing about the worst possible scenarios regarding what she believes is Akito's feelings for his sister.
11	"Fleeting" "Hakanai" (はかない)	December 14, 2012
Anastasia can't find her underwear and is forced to spend the rest of the day without it, which proves troublesome when Arisa/Alisa reports something strange in the woods and the gang decides to investigate. When their search turns up nothing and they lose each other whilst going home, Anastasia reminisces about how she and the Himenokoji twins met. Kaoruko has a fever-induced dream that she and Akito's cohabitants have entered a polygamous marriage with him.
12	"Love It" "Aidane" (あいだね)	December 21, 2012
Anastasia reminisces about her first impressions of Akito. The gang returns from the woods without seeing any ghosts, but after Kaoruko and a litter of kittens turn up in the yard, the apparition of green flames sends everyone scurrying into Akito's room for cover. Things get even more complicated when Akito discovers that Arisa/Alisa has slept on his lap in the nude. Akiko then apologises to Akito for having doubts as to whether he would come back for her after being separated. The credits roll with Akito explaining that he is not actually related to Akiko by blood, but that he prefers to keep that to himself since he believes that Akiko needs a brother to look up to.
