= Complex (psychology) =

Core pattern of emotions, memories, perceptions, and desires

A complex is a structure in the unconscious that is objectified as an underlying theme—like a power or a status—by grouping clusters of emotions, memories, perceptions and wishes in response to a threat to the stability of the self. In psychoanalysis, it is antithetical to drives.

== Overview ==
An example of a complex would be as follows: if a person had a leg amputated as a child, this would influence the person's life in profound ways, even upon overcoming the physical handicap. The person may have many thoughts, emotions, memories, feelings of inferiority, triumphs, bitterness, and determinations centering on that one aspect of life. If these thoughts were troubling and pervasive, Jung might say the person had a "complex" about the leg.

The reality of complexes is widely agreed upon in the area of depth psychology, a branch of psychology asserting that the vast majority of the personality is determined and influenced by unconscious processes. Complexes are common features of the psychic landscape, according to Jung's accounting of the psyche, and often become relevant in psychotherapy to examine and resolve, most especially in the journey toward individuation or wholeness. Without resolution, complexes continue to exert unconscious, maladaptive influence on our thoughts, feelings, and behavior and keep us from achieving psychological integration.

== History and development of the idea ==
Carl Jung distinguished between two types of unconscious mind: the personal unconscious and collective unconscious. The personal unconscious was the accumulation of experiences from a person's lifetime that could not be consciously recalled. The collective unconscious, on the other hand, was a sort of universal inheritance of human beings, a "species memory" passed on to each of us, not unlike the motor programs and instincts of other animals. Jung believed the personal unconscious was dominated by complexes.

The term complex (German: Komplex; also emotionally charged complexes or feeling-toned complex of ideas), was coined by Carl Jung when he was still a close associate of Sigmund Freud. Complexes were so central to Jung's ideas that he originally called his body of theories Complex psychology. Historically the term originated with Theodor Ziehen, a German psychiatrist who experimented with reaction time in word association test responses. Jung described a complex as a node in the unconscious; it may be imagined as a knot of unconscious feelings and beliefs, detectable indirectly, through behavior that is puzzling or hard to account for.

Jung developed his theory regarding complexes very early in his career through the word association tests conducted at the Burghölzli, the psychiatric clinic of Zurich University, where he worked from 1900 to 1908. In the word association tests, a researcher would read a list of 100 words to a subject, who was asked to say, as quickly as possible, the first thing that came to mind in response to each word, and the subject's reaction time was measured in fifths of a second. (Sir Francis Galton invented the method in 1879.) Researchers noted any unusual reactions—hesitations, slips of the tongue, signs of emotion. Jung was interested in patterns he detected in subjects' responses, hinting at unconscious feelings and beliefs.

In Jung's theory, complexes may be conscious, partly conscious, or unconscious. As well, complexes can be positive or negative, resulting in good or bad consequences. There are many kinds of them, but at the core of any complex is a universal pattern of experience, or archetype. Two of the major complexes Jung wrote about were the anima (a node of unconscious beliefs and feelings in a man's psyche relating to the opposite gender) and animus (the corresponding complex in a woman's psyche). Other major complexes include the mother, father, hero, and more recently, the brother and sister. Jung believed it was perfectly normal to have complexes because everyone has emotional experiences that affect the psyche. Although they are normal, negative complexes can cause us pain and suffering.

One of the key differences between Jungian and Freudian theory is that Jung's thought posits several different kinds of complex. Freud only focused on the Oedipus complex which reflected developmental challenges that face every young boy. He did not take other complexes into account except for the Electra complex, which he briefly spoke of.

After years of working together, Jung broke from Freud, due to disagreements in their ideas, and they each developed their own theories. Jung wanted to distinguish between his and Freud's findings, so he named his theory "analytical psychology".

== Jung's theory of complexes with key citations ==
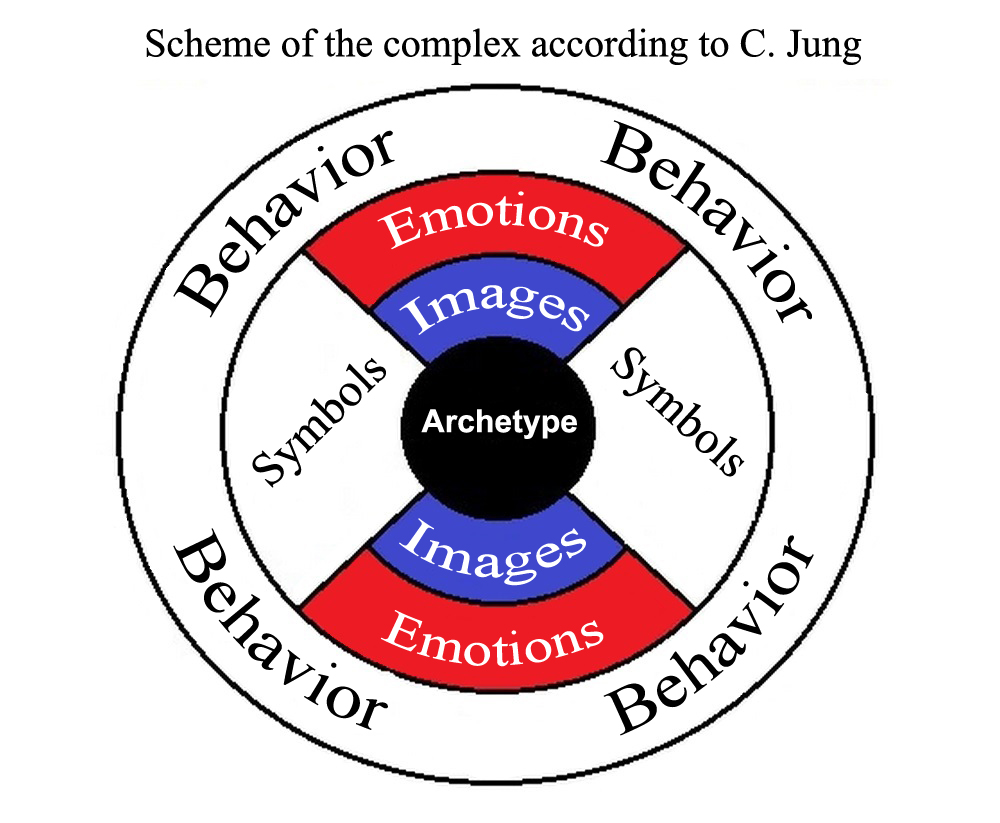

The ego itself can be thought of as a complex, not yet fully integrated with other parts of the psyche (namely, the superego and the id, or unconscious). As described by Jung, "by ego I understand a complex of ideas which constitutes the center of my field of consciousness and appears to possess a high degree of continuity and identity. Hence I also speak of an ego-complex".

Jung often used the term complex to describe a partially repressed, yet highly influential cluster of charged psychic material split off from, or at odds with, the conscious "I". Daniels described complexes in 2010 as "'stuck-together' agglomerations of thoughts, feelings, behavior patterns, and somatic forms of expression". Concerning its nature as feeling-toned, Jung wrote "[a complex] is the image of a certain psychic situation which is strongly accentuated emotionally and is, moreover, incompatible with the habitual attitude of consciousness. This image has a powerful inner coherence, it has its own wholeness and, in addition, a relatively high degree of autonomy, so that it is subject to the control of the conscious mind to only a limited extent, and therefore behaves like an animated foreign body in the sphere of consciousness."

Some complexes can usurp power from the ego and can cause psychological disturbances and symptoms resulting from the development of a neurosis. Jung described the autonomous, self-directing nature of complexes when he said

"what is not so well known, but far more important theoretically, is that complexes can have us. The existence of complexes throws serious doubt on the naive assumption of the unity of consciousness, which is equated with 'psyche,' and on the supremacy of the will. Every constellation of a complex postulates a disturbed state of consciousness. The unity of consciousness is disrupted and the intentions of the will are impeded or made impossible. Even memory is often noticeably affected, as we have seen. The complex must therefore be a psychic factor that, in terms of energy, possesses a value that sometimes exceeds that of our conscious intentions, otherwise, such disruptions of the conscious order would not be possible at all. And in fact, an active complex puts us momentarily under a state of duress, of compulsive thinking and acting, for which under certain conditions the only appropriate term would be the judicial concept of diminished responsibility"

On the other hand, Jung spoke of the "differentiating functions" as essentially the healthy development of useful complexes, yet not without bringing about often undesirable side effects.

"It is true that we do not refer to this [training and development of functions] as obsession by a complex, but as one-sidedness. Still, the actual state is approximately the same, with this difference, that the one-sidedness is intended by the individual and is fostered by all the means in his power, whereas the complex is felt to be injurious and disturbing. People often fail to see that consciously willed one-sidedness is one of the most important causes of an undesirable complex, and that, conversely, certain complexes cause a one-sided differentiation of doubtful value.

In Psychological Types, Jung describes the effects of tensions between the dominant and inferior differentiating functions, often forming complexes and neuroses, in high and even extremely one-sided types.

"In the foregoing descriptions I have no desire to give my readers the impression that these types occur at all frequently in such pure form in actual life. They are, as it were, only Galtonesque family portraits, which single out the common and therefore typical features, stressing them disproportionately, while the individual features are just as disproportionately effaced.

== In archetypal psychology ==
Suffering contains complexes; complexes contain archetypes; archetypes contain the myths of deities; this figurative analogy is used to understand the afflicted subject.

== Complexes and subpersonalities ==
Jung conceptualized complexes as having a high degree of autonomy, describing them as ‘splinter psyches’ that form the basis for ‘mini-personalities’, whom he called the ‘little people’. This provided the foundation for later expansion of the idea, most notably by British Psychotherapist John Rowan, who referred to them as subpersonalities, each one operating as a 'semipermanent and semi-autonomous region of the personality capable of acting as a person'.

The work of Rowan and others led to the widespread use of techniques by which psychotherapists encourage clients to express the thoughts, feelings, and attitudes of their various subpersonalities, as a way of facilitating the integration of diverse characteristics, part of what Jung called individuation.

== Examples ==
Complexes
Name	Key Theorist(s)	Description	Refs
Anima complex/ Anima and animus	Carl Jung	The unconscious feminine side of a male psyche, or the associated emotional problems/attitudes.	
Adonis complex	Harrison G. Pope, Jr., Katharine A. Phillips, and Roberto Olivardia	A preoccupation with having a more muscular and/or leaner body than is physically possible, often associated with body dysmorphia.	
Apprentice complex	Unknown/Various	The psychological difficulty or resistance faced by an apprentice or student when transitioning into a role of authority or professional independence.	
Cassandra complex	Jungian Analysts (e.g., Evi Zapf)	The predicament of being able to foresee a disaster but being unable to convince others of the severity of the threat.	
Cinderella complex	Colette Dowling	An unconscious wish to be saved by others (e.g., a "Prince Charming"), characterized by a fear of independence.	
Don Juan complex	Otto Rank	An insatiable, compulsive desire in a man to seduce women, often rooted in an unconscious fear of and contempt for women.	
Electra complex	Carl Jung (originally), Sigmund Freud (concept)	A girl's psychosexual competition with her mother for possession of her father (the female version of the Oedipus complex)	
Empedocles complex	Gaston Bachelard	The fascination with the relationship between fire and thought; specifically, the desire to prove oneself by suicide (like Empedocles's alleged leap into Mount Etna).	
Father complex	Carl Jung	The collection of unconscious attitudes and beliefs a person holds towards their father, which affects their relationships with other male authority figures.	
God complex	Unknown/Various	An unshakable belief characterized by constantly thinking and acting as if one were a god, without regard for empirical evidence.	
Guilt Complex	Sigmund Freud (concept)	An exaggerated, pervasive, or irrational feeling of remorse and self-blame, often stemming from unconscious conflicts.	
Hero complex	Unknown/Various	A need to be perceived as a hero or savior by others, often resulting in seeking out situations where help is desperately needed.	
Hoffmann complex	Gaston Bachelard	An intense, sometimes dangerous fascination with alcohol or spirits ("the water that flames"), often linked to poetic or imaginative thought.	
Icarus complex	Henry Murray, Gaston Bachelard	A pathological desire to climb or rise, often involving an overambition leading to risky behavior and a fear of failure (a "fall").	
Inferiority complex	Alfred Adler	A consistent feeling of inadequacy, often resulting in the belief that one is in some way deficient, or inferior, to others.	
Jocasta complex	Raymond de Saussure	The term for a mother's incestuous desire for her son.	
Jonah complex	Abraham Maslow	The fear of one's own greatness, a flight from one's destiny or best talents, or the evasion of a special calling.	
Laius complex	Sigmund Freud (concept)	A father's unconscious desire to harm or eliminate his son, often out of jealousy or fear of being supplanted.	
Madonna–whore complex	Sigmund Freud	The inability to maintain sexual arousal within a committed, loving relationship, causing men to seek out "pure" (Madonna) and "degraded" (whore) women.	
Martyr/Victim complex	Unknown/Various	A personality pattern in which a person desires the feeling of being a victim or martyr for the sake of attention or to avoid responsibility.	
Medusa complex	Sigmund Freud	The fear of castration, represented by the sight of Medusa's severed head and its power to turn men into stone.	
Messianic/Messiah complex	Unknown/Various	A state of mind in which an individual believes they are destined to be a savior of a group, society, or the world.	
Money complex	Sigmund Freud	A person's unconscious, often symbolic, attitudes and conflicts concerning money, often relating to underlying issues of power, security, or self-worth.	
Napoleon complex	Alfred Adler (concept)	A speculated condition where short people overcompensate for their height with overly aggressive, dominant, or tyrannical behavior.	
Novalis complex	Gaston Bachelard	A specific obsession with the relationship between fire and light, especially a desire to explore the essence of light/fire.	
Oedipus complex	Sigmund Freud	A boy's psychosexual competition with his father for possession of his mother.	
Ophelia complex	Unknown/Various	A pathological tendency in young women, often associated with depression, a sense of helplessness, and self-destructive behavior.	
Parental Complex	Carl Jung	A general term for the collection of unconscious emotional patterns a person has toward their parents, which influences adult relationships.	
Persecution complex	Emil Kraepelin	An exaggerated, irrational feeling that one is being harassed, tormented, or unfairly treated by others.	
Pessimist complex	Unknown/Various	A pervasive, habitual tendency toward negative expectations and belief that the worst will always happen.	
Peter pan complex	Dan Kiley	A syndrome where an adult, typically a man, does not want to grow up and remains emotionally and socially immature.	
Phaedra complex	Unknown/Various	A woman's incestuous desire for her stepson.	
Phaeton complex	Unknown/Various	A psychodynamic pattern associated with reckless, overly ambitious, or dangerous behavior driven by a desire to impress a parent or authority figure.	
Prometheus complex	Gaston Bachelard	An intellectual obsession with knowledge and a desire to know as much as one's parents or teachers, often leading to a sense of intellectual superiority.	
Saint complex	Unknown/Various	A psychological pattern involving an exaggerated desire to be seen as morally perfect, pure, or self-sacrificing.	
Savior complex	Unknown/Various	A psychological need to "save" or help others, often to an extent that is detrimental to oneself and/or the person being helped.	
Superiority complex	Alfred Adler	A psychological defense mechanism that compensates for an underlying feeling of inadequacy (inferiority complex), characterized by an inflated self-concept.	
Superman complex	Unknown/Various	An overcompensation for a sense of low self-worth, where an individual seeks to achieve impossible standards of perfection or dominance.	

== See also ==
- View (Buddhism)
- Family romance
- Freudian psychology
- Jungian psychology
- Condensation (psychology)
- Anima and animus

== Bibliography ==
- Bernardini, R. (2011). Jung a Eranos. Il progetto della psicologia complessa [Jung at Eranos. The Complex Psychology Project] (in Italian). Milano: FrancoAngeli. ISBN 978-88-568-3449-9.
- Carlini, C. (2005), Understanding Freud's Oedipus complex, archived from the original on 2011-07-19
- Cowgil, C. (May 1997), Carl Jung, archived from the original on 2010-11-05
- Daniels, Victor (2010), Handout on Carl Gustav Jung
- Dewey, R. A. (2018) [2007]. Psychology: An Introduction (2017-2018 revision).
- Jung, C.G. (1971) [1921]. Psychological Types. Collected Works. Vol. 6. Princeton, N.J.: Princeton University Press. ISBN 978-0-691-01813-3.
- Jung, C.G. (1969) [1960]. The Structure and Dynamics of the Psyche. Collected Works. Vol. 8. Princeton, N.J.: Princeton University Press. ISBN 978-0-691-09774-9.
- Mattoon, M. (September 5, 1999), Jungian psychology in perspective, archived from the original on January 25, 2021
- Schultz, D.; Schultz, S. (2009). Theories of Personality (9th ed.). Belmont, CA: Wadsworth, Cengage Learning.
- Wishard, WVD (November 14, 2004), What is the archetype of the apocalypse all about?, archived from the original on 2011-07-25
