= Martyr complex =

Desire to seek suffering or persecution

In psychology, a person who has a martyr complex (or martyrdom complex) desires the feeling of being a martyr for their own sake and seeks out suffering or persecution because it either feeds a physical and/or psychological need, or a desire to avoid responsibility. In some cases, this results from the belief that the martyr has been singled out for persecution because of exceptional ability or integrity. Other martyr complexes involve willful suffering in the name of love or duty. This has been observed especially in poor families, as well as in codependent or abusive relationships. It can also involve self-sacrifice and duty in the name of a collective, or for other people generally, rather than for oneself only. The desire for martyrdom is sometimes considered a form of masochism. Allan Berger, however, described it as one of several patterns of "pain/suffering seeking behavior", including asceticism and penance. Theologian Paul Johnson considers such beliefs a topic of concern for the mental health of clergy.

== See also ==
- Complex (psychology)
  - Messiah complex
  - Persecution complex
- Galileo gambit
- Savior complex
- Victim mentality
