= Napoleonist syndrome =

Psychological complex

The Napoleonist syndrome is a psychological complex, or character disorder, underlying the attachment shown by members of a combatant country to the enemy leader Napoleon.

It may be extended to cover parallel switches of allegiance in more modern times.

== Nineteenth-century examples ==
During the 1790s, there was considerable sympathy outside France with the ideals of the French Revolution; but a decade later, after Napoleon had come to sole power, active sympathisers were much reduced in numbers: the collapse of Beethoven's Napoleonist family romance, on hearing of Bonaparte's coronation as emperor, is a prime example of the change. Those Napoleonists that remained, however, came from all sides of the political spectrum—ranging from Queen Caroline to Radicals like William Hazlitt—something that has prompted a psychological explanation of their underlying motivation.

The common factor in that syndrome is taken to be an ambivalent relationship to the parent or parent of origins, leading to a rejection of national authority, and its projection abroad. The argument is particularly convincing in the case of a group of Radicals including Leigh Hunt and William Godwin, as well as Hazlitt—all the sons of dissenting ministers, whose religious beliefs they had rejected but whose influence on them remained substantial nevertheless. Their common revolt against their fathers led to a counter-identification with the heroic figure presented by Napoleon—his Promethean challenge to the existing order seeming to offer a stark contrast to the narrow authoritarianism represented both by their own fathers, and by the British royal family.

== Literary analogues ==
- Russian literature was pervaded by Napoleonism, from Pushkin to Raskolnikov.
- Doris Lessing in The Golden Notebook parodied the Western Communist idealisation (paternalisation) of Stalin: "... working for us! For the world! ... in custody of the destinies of us all.... with a fatherly twinkle in his eyes".

== See also ==
- Cambridge Five
- Cult
- Delusions of grandeur where people may think they are Napoleon
- Double agent
- Father complex
- The enemy of my enemy is my friend
- Treason
