= Stepfamily =

Family where one parent has children that are not genetically related to the other parent

A stepfamily (sometimes called a bonus family) is a family where at least one parent has children who are not biologically related to their spouse. Either parent, or both, may have children from previous relationships or marriages. Two known classifications for stepfamilies include "simple" stepfamilies, where only one member of the family's couple has a prior child or children and the couple does not have any children together, and "complex" or "blended" families, where both members of the couple have at least one child from another relationship.

== Etymology ==
The earliest recorded use of the prefix step-, in the form steop-, is from an 8th-century glossary of Latin-Old English words meaning 'orphan'. Steopsunu is given for the Latin word filiaster and steopmoder for nouerca. Similar words recorded later in Old English include stepbairn, stepchild, and stepfather. The words are used to denote a connection resulting from the remarriage of a widowed parent and are related to the word ástíeped meaning 'bereaved', with stepbairn and stepchild occasionally used simply as synonyms for orphan. Words such as stepbrother, stepniece and stepparent appeared much later and have no particular connotation of bereavement. Corresponding words in other Germanic languages include Old High German stiuf- and Old Norse stjúp-.

== Terminology ==
A child is referred to as the stepdaughter or stepson of their biological or adoptive parent's new spouse, and the spouse is referred to as the stepparent (father or mother) of the child.

A stepparent is the spouse of someone's parent, and not their biological parent, stepfather being the male spouse and stepmother the female spouse.

In Australia, Under the Family Law Act 1975 (Cth), a "stepparent" in relation to a child is interpreted as a person who is not a parent of the child and is, or has been, married to or a de facto partner of a parent of the child, and treats, or at any time while married to or a de facto partner of the parent treated, the child as a member of the family formed with the parent. If one member of the couple has prior children but the couple have another child together, the complex/blended designation replaces the "simple" designation upon the birth of the new child.

== Challenges ==
According to James Bray, three of the challenges facing a stepfamily are financial and living arrangements, resolving feelings about the previous marriage, and anticipating parenting changes. Research has shown that parents who are constantly fighting with their ex-spouse tend to make their children suffer mentally and emotionally. However, parents who are close with their ex-spouse tend to make their new spouse insecure and anxious.

Additional challenges that a step- or blended family face are those regarding the inherent bond that biological parents have with their children and vice versa. Stepparents often face significant difficulties when interacting with the biological parent of their gender. Often, biological parents feel as though the stepfather or stepmother will ultimately replace them in the mind(s) of the child(ren). This is a common feeling for a parent when faced with the new circumstance of blended families.

== Legal status ==
Although historically stepfamilies are built through the institution of marriage and are legally recognized, it is currently unclear if a stepfamily can be both established and recognized by less-formal arrangements, such as when a man or woman with children cohabits with another man or woman outside of marriage. This relationship is becoming more common in all Western countries.

There appear to be many cultures in which these families are recognized socially as de facto families. However, in modern Western culture it is often unclear as to what, if any, social status and protection they enjoy in law.

The stepparent is a "legal stranger" in most of the U.S. and has no legal right to the minor child no matter how involved in the child's life they are. The biological parents (and, where applicable, adoptive parents) hold that privilege and responsibility. If the biological parent does not give up their parental rights and custody of the child, the other parent's subsequent marriage cannot create a parental relationship without the biological parent's written consent before a "child" reaches adulthood. In most cases, the stepparent can not be ordered to pay child support.

Stepparents generally do not have the authority to give legal consent to medical treatment for a stepchild, unless the stepparent has legally adopted the child or been designated a legal guardian. A child's parents or legal guardians may sign a statement authorizing a third party to consent to medical care.

If a stepparent legally adopts the partner's child or children, he or she becomes the child's legal parent. In such cases, the parents may stop using the terms stepparent and stepchild and instead refer to the child simply as their son or daughter; depending on the child's degree of affinity for the adoptive parent and/or approval of the legal proceedings culminating in the child's adoption, the child may likewise drop the "step-" designation from his or her description of the relationship. Even when all parties describe the relationship using the terms applied to biological and adoptive families, however, at least some of the emotional and psychological issues common to stepfamilies may or may not persist. Thus, one possibility is that a stepfamily can be reconfigured, and thanks to the biological and adoptive links could leave the condition of a stepfamily.

== Stepparent adoption ==
=== United States ===
In the world (including the United States), the most common form of adoption is adopting a stepchild. By adopting a stepchild, the stepparent is agreeing to be fully responsible for their spouse's child. The non-custodial parent no longer has any rights or responsibilities for the child, including child support.

When a stepparent adopts a stepchild, either the other biological parent willingly gives up their parental rights to the child, the court terminates those rights, or the other biological parent is deceased. Reasons a court may terminate the non-custodial parent's rights include evidence of abuse or neglect, legal abandonment, or any other indications that a continued relationship between the child and that parent would be detrimental to the child. Grounds for legal child abandonment in most states is no contact between the parent and child for at least one year.

=== Canada ===
In Canada, one needs to put into writing what the child's circumstances are for being adopted. Some circumstances may include: the child's mental, physical, and emotional welfare, their background, religion, having a positive relationship, etc. If the child is an indigenous person, then the family must specify their plan to keep the child involved in their culture.

== Abuse ==
A common villain of classic fairy tales is the abusive stepmother, like the queen in Snow White and the Seven Dwarfs, Lady Tremaine in Cinderella, or Madame Fichini in The Trouble with Sophie, which shows mother-in-law as cruel. She mistreats her non-biological child by locking them away, or trying to kill them in some cases, and treats her own children, if any, very well. In popular culture, phrases like "I'll beat you like a red-headed stepchild" are uttered as a common threat that show just how aware people are about the assumed nature of stepfamily abuse. The thought is that the nonbiological child is more likely to be beaten because of the lack of kinship ties. The research on this topic shows that this issue is not so clearly defined. The image of the wicked stepmother is well known but much of the research available shows more of the abuse coming from stepfathers.

Stepfathers have been shown to abuse female stepchildren more than males. They are also shown to be more abusive towards female children than biological families, but less abusive than adoptive fathers. The abuse studied with men in mind tends to focus on physical or sexual abuse of children rather than emotional abuse. Neglect is also discussed as a qualifying method of child abuse by stepparents in general. In 2004 a U.S. study by Weekes and Weekes-Shackelford found that while biological fathers fatally abuse children five and under at a rate of 5.6 per million per year, stepfathers were found to have a rate of 55.9 per million per year. A U.K. study done in 2000 had different results which found that many fewer children responded as being abused by a stepparent. Economic factors could also play a role in the abuse of stepchildren. In places with higher levels of social strain, abuse may be more prevalent or more violent. Other studies of census data and child neglect and abuse records have found that stepparents may be over-represented in abuse figures. They have found that when the data is balanced, biological parents have a much higher rate of abuse than stepparents do.

There is little research in the field of parental abuse by children in concern with stepchildren abusing stepparents. The abuse of stepchildren by their siblings is also a topic with little research.

== In research ==
In her book, Becoming a Stepfamily, Patricia Papernow (1993) suggests that each stepfamily goes through seven distinct stages of development, which can be divided into the early, middle, and late stages. The early stages consist of the fantasy, immersion, and awareness stages. In the fantasy stage, both children and parents are typically "stuck" in their fantasies or wishes for what their family could be like. The developmental task for this stage is for each member to articulate their wants and needs. In the Immersion stage, the family is typically struggling to live out the fantasy of a "perfect" blended family. In this stage, it is critical for the "insider spouse" (i.e. the biological parent who typically forms the emotional hub of the family) to understand that the feelings of the "outsider spouse" and children are real. The task of this stage is to persist in the struggle to become aware of the various experiences. This stage is followed by the awareness stage, in which the family gathers information about what the new family looks like (e.g., roles, traditions, "family culture") and how each member feels about it. The tasks of this stage are twofold: individual and joint. The individual task is for each member to begin to put words to the feelings they are experiencing, and to voice their needs to other family members. The joint task is for family members to begin to transcend the "experiential gaps" and to try to form an understanding of other members' roles and experiences.

The middle stages consist of the mobilization and action stages. In the mobilization stage, the stepparent can begin to step forward to address the family's process and structure. The tasks of this stage are to confront differences in each member's perception of the new family, as well as to influence one another before shaming or blaming begins to take action to reorganize the family structure. The goal here is to make joint decisions about new stepfamily rituals, rules, and roles. The focus in this stage is on the stepfamily's unique "middle ground" (i.e. the "areas of shared experience, shared values, and easy cooperative functioning created over time"), and on balancing this new middle ground with honoring of past and other relationships.

The later stages consist of the contact and resolution stages. In the contact stage, the couple is working well together, the boundaries between households are clear, and stepparents have definite roles with stepchildren as "intimate outsiders." The task for this stage is in solidifying the stepparent's role, and in continuing the process of awareness. Finally, in the resolution stage, the stepfamily's identity has become secure. The family accepts itself for who it is, there is a strong sense of the stepfamily's middle ground, and children feel secure in both households. The task for this stage is to nourish the depth and maturity gained through this process, and to rework any issues that might arise at family "nodal events" (e.g., weddings, funerals, graduations, etc.).

In her book, Stepmonster: A New Look at Why Real Stepmothers Think, Feel, and Act the Way We Do, social researcher Wednesday Martin takes an anthropological approach to examining stepfamily dynamics.

== Education ==
The prevalence of stepfamilies has increased over the past century with the increase of divorce and remarriage. According to the Step Family Foundation, "over 50% of US families are remarried or recoupled." These families are unique in their experiences facing many challenges which first-married families do not. For example, role ambiguity, dealing with stepchildren, and ex-spouses are only a few of the issues which are unique to these families. In response to these families' desire for assistance, stepfamily education has become an increasingly common topic among scholars and educators. Although still a relatively new facet within the marriage education realm, stepfamily education provides important information which may not be addressed in traditional marriage or relationship education curriculum. As discussed by Adler-Baeder and Higginbotham (2004) a number of curricula are currently available to stepfamilies and family life educators; however, further research is needed in order to determine best practices for the field. One way in which this gap is being filled is through the current implementation of Healthy Marriage Demonstration Grants in the U.S. As part of the Deficit Reduction Act of 2005, grants for healthy marriage and responsible fatherhood, which include at-risk and diverse populations such as stepfamilies, are providing important information on the evaluation of stepfamily programs and their effectiveness in servicing stepfamilies.

== See also ==
- Half-sibling
- Cinderella effect
- Phaedra complex
