= Phaeton complex =

Psychological condition

The Phaeton complex is a psychological condition described by Maryse Choisy as a "painful combination of thoughts and emotions caused by the absence, loss, coldness, or traumatizing behavior of one or both parents, resulting in frustration and aggression".

The theory was devised by Lucille Iremonger, who in 1970 studied the 24 British prime ministers who held office from 1809 to 1940, and found that 62% of these men had lost one or both parents by age 15, compared to a national average of 10-15% in those times. Hugh Berrington expanded on the theory in 1974, finding sufferers of the Phaeton complex to be less sociable, flexible or tolerant, instead being ambitious, vain, sensitive, lonely and shy. Micha Popper, though, disputes that an unhappy childhood always leads to obsessive urges, citing Winston Churchill as an example where childhood unhappiness had positive results.

The name derives from the Greek myth of Phaeton, a child of the sun god, who demands to drive his father's chariot and in doing so, falls to earth and scorches the Sahara Desert.

== Examples ==
Neville Chamberlain, UK prime minister 1937–40, having lost his mother by age six, is said to have displayed 'all the characteristics of the damaged Phaeton - immature, sensitive, cold, secretive and depressed' when in office, according to Harry Davis.

Zulfikar Ali Bhutto is described by Shamim Ahmad as a neglected child, 'having a sense of insecurity that drove him to prove himself worthy'.

In a discussion of the Phaeton complex, Tom McTague lists Boris Johnson, Theresa May, Bill Clinton and Tony Blair as examples of ambitious, isolated, detached politicians who suffered a 'deprivation of love' in childhood.

== See also ==
- Complex (psychology)
- Ideocracy
- Napoleon complex
