= Family romance =

Psychological complex

The family romance is a psychological complex identified by Sigmund Freud in an essay he wrote in 1909 entitled "The Family Romances." In it he describes various phases a child experiences as he or she must confront the fact that the parents are not wholly emotionally available. Children have asexual feelings of jealousy within the family, and as a defense young children or adolescents fantasize that they are really the children of parents of higher social standing than their actual parents. The fantasy avenges the child's hurt by positing a better family. Later, the child's jealousies will become more overtly sexual as he or she passes through various stages of Oedipal development. More broadly, the term can be used to cover the whole range of instinctual ties between siblings, and parents and children.

== Freud's thesis ==
Freud published a short piece on the Family Romance in Otto Rank's The Myth of the Birth of the Hero (1908) – the study later appearing separately in print both in German and in English. Freud had anticipated the theme in the 1890s, in a private reflection on Conrad Ferdinand Meyer. In his article, Freud argued for the widespread existence among neurotics of a fable in which the present-day parents were imposters, replacing a real and more aristocratic pair; but also that in repudiating the parents of today, the child is merely "turning away from the father whom he knows today to the father in whom he believed in the earliest years of his childhood".

Later psychoanalysts have added that the child may turn to imaginary parents of a lower (= uninhibited) social standing; and have seen the essence of the romance in the splitting and doubling of the parents – a dichotomization which hinders the effective working through of the parent complex.

== Literary examples ==
- The institutionalised heroine of I Never Promised You a Rose Garden shares a room with a memory-impaired girl who gives herself multiple sets of musical celebrity parents: "My father – he's Paderewski, and my mother is Sophie Tucker".
- The 'Gothic Family Romance' is the converse projection of the hostile or threatening aspects of the parents on to monsters and threats from outside the family in Gothic fiction.

== See also ==
- Cinderella
- Little Lord Fauntleroy
- Napoleonist Syndrome
- Richard Savage
- Thomas Chatterton
