= Phaedra complex =

Term for stepmother-stepson sexual desire

The Phaedra complex (/ˈfiːdrə, ˈfɛdrə/) is an informal, non-scientific designation to the sexual desire of a stepmother for her stepson, though the term has been extended to cover difficult relationships between stepparents and stepchildren in general.

== Origins ==
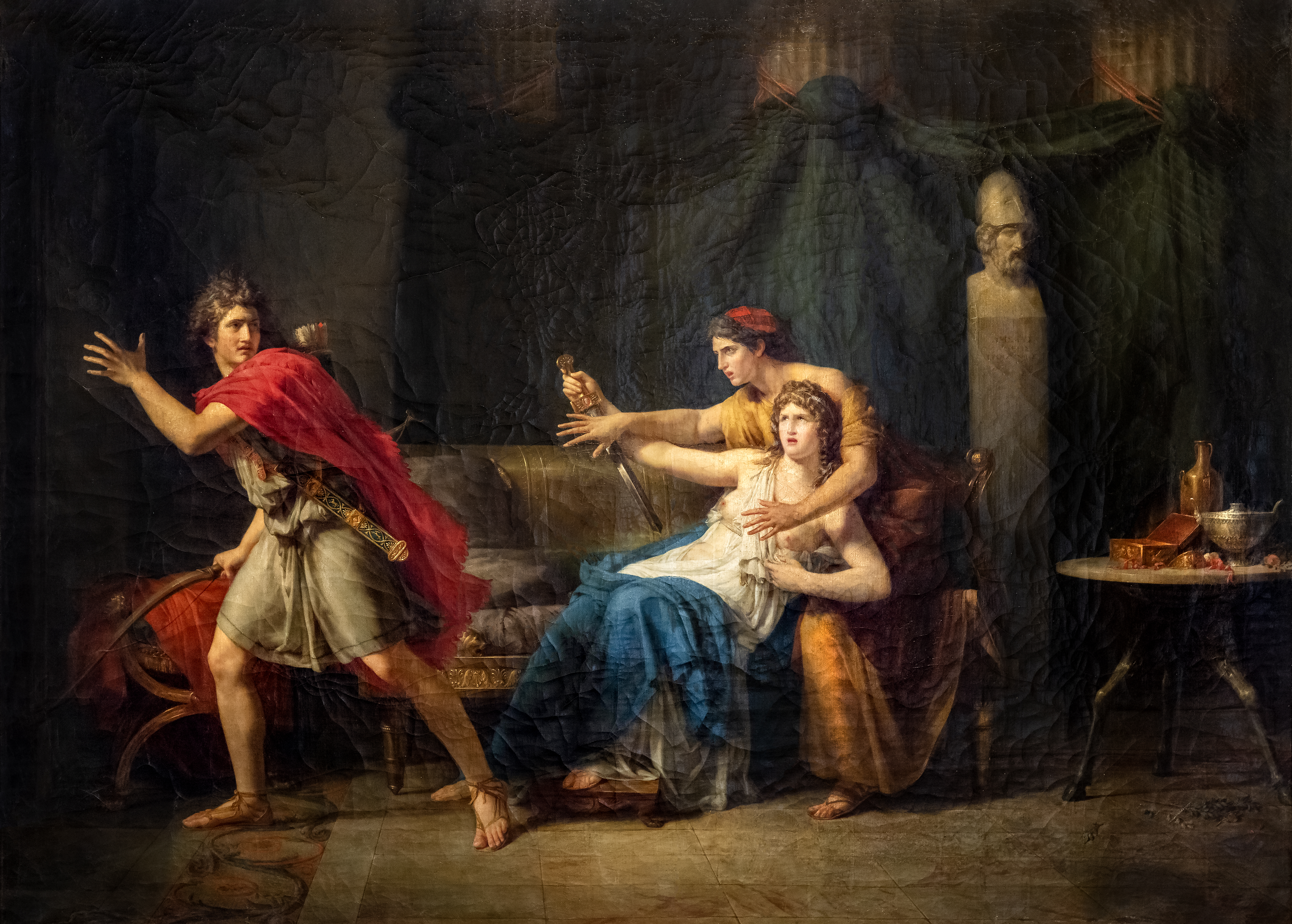
Hippolytus after the confession of Phaedra, his stepmother, by Étienne-Barthélémy Garnier; Musée Ingres, Montauban

The complex takes its name from Greek mythology. Phaedra was the daughter of Minos and Pasiphaë, wife of Theseus, sister of Ariadne, and the mother of Demophon of Athens and Acamas. Though married to Theseus, Phaedra fell in love with Hippolytus, Theseus' son born by either Hippolyta, queen of the Amazons, or Antiope, her sister.

When Hippolytus refused Phaedra's advances, she falsely accused him of propositioning her. Phaedra eventually killed herself in remorse after his subsequent death.

== Cultural analogues ==
- Amata in the Aeneid has been seen as cognate to Phaedra in her love for her future son-in-law Turnus and her eventual suicide at the news of his death.
- In the Hebrew Bible, Potiphar's wife Zuleikha made a pass at Joseph, but Joseph refused her. So, Zuleikha accused Joseph of rape and he was put in prison, but eventually released. According to the tradition, Zuleikha made advances at many of her foster children before Joseph.
- In the ballad Child Owlet, Lady Erskine propositions her nephew, and upon rebuttal accuses him of attempting to seduce her, leading to his murder.

== Other use ==
- French philosopher Georges Bataille used the same term in a very different sense to describe the morbid desire for a corpse.

== See also ==
- Cougar (slang)
- Covert incest
- Jocasta complex
- Parentification
