= Rumination (psychology) =

Focused attention on one's mental distress

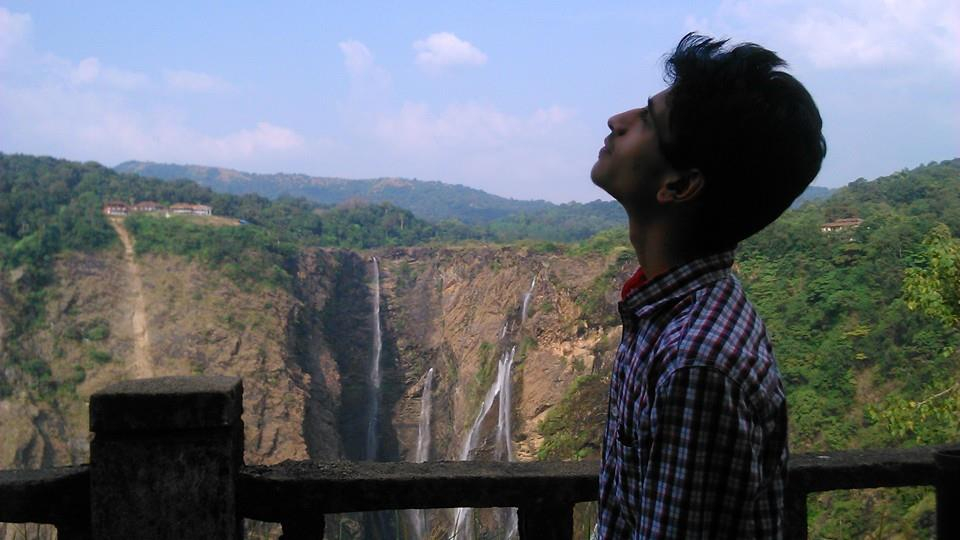
Rumination is related to worry.

Rumination is the sustained focus on and repetition of negative thoughts and emotions. There are various psychological models of rumination, which focus on different aspects: negative emotions and/or the circumstances surrounding that emotion; discrepancies between one's current and desired status; and the negative themes of uncontrollability and harm in metacognitions.

Rumination is a mechanism that develops and sustains psychopathological conditions such as anxiety, depression, and other mental states. Multiple tools exist to measure ruminative thoughts. Treatments specifically addressing ruminative thought patterns are still in the early stages of development. However, recent meta analyses of randomized-controlled trials suggest that psychological interventions including mindfulness and mindfulness-based interventions can significantly reduce rumination.

== Definition ==
Popularly defined, rumination is "an endless repetition of a negative thought or theme that spirals downward", or an "endless loop of reрetitive thoughts аnd worries". Dictionary definitions of rumination include:

- Cambridge Dictionary: "the act of thinking carefully and for a long period about something"
- Merriam-Webster: "to go over in the mind repeatedly and often casually or slowly"

Scholarly definitions include:

- Response Styles Theory: a form of coping with self-discrepancy in which one focuses on self-referent thoughts and emotions instead of goal-directed action.
- Goal Progress Theory: "the tendency to think recurrently about important, higher order goals that have not yet been attained" or towards which sufficient progress has not been made.

== Occurrence ==
=== Variations ===
Some common thoughts that are characteristic of ruminative responses are questioning the well-being of oneself and focusing on the possible causes and consequences of one's depressive symptoms. For example, some ruminative thoughts include "why am I such a loser", "I'm in such a bad mood" or "I just don't feel like doing anything".

Several variations of rumination can be distinguished in various types or forms:

- State rumination: dwelling on the consequences and feelings associated with the failure. State rumination is more common in people who are pessimistic, neurotic, and who have negative attributional styles.
- Action rumination: task-oriented thought processes focused on goal-achievement and correction of mistakes.
- Task-irrelevant rumination: utilizing events or people unassociated with the blocked goal to distract a person from the failure.
- Post-event processing: pervasive detailed reviewing of socially failed or embarrassing activities or situations that subjects perceive even more negatively/anxiety-provoking than they were, and they reinforce with pervasive recollections of similarly biased memories.
- Stress-reactive rumination: a pervasive detailed reviewing of painful experiences that specific stressful events induced and a cognitive bias enhances by memorising these events generally more stressful that they were while triggering depression.

=== Sex differences ===
According to Susan Nolen-Hoeksema, women tend to ruminate when they are depressed, whereas men tend to distract themselves. This difference in response style was proposed to explain the higher rates of depression in women compared to men. Research has supported the theory that women have a greater likelihood to ruminate than men, but the magnitude of this difference seems to be small. The prediction that men are more likely to distract themselves has not been consistently supported in research.

A meta-analysis was performed on both the sex differences in rumination of adults and the rumination subtypes "brooding" and "reflection." Studies show that women's chances of experiencing depressive symptoms or depression was twice that of men. The response styles theory (RST) suggests this may be due, to some extent, to higher rates of rumination in women. Brooding can be operationalized as continuous, passive, negative internalized thoughts. It is highly connected to worsening depression. Reflection is neutral, rather than negative, more active observation of self. In the meta-analysis, women showed statistically significant increases in levels of both brooding and reflection, supporting RST. Interestingly, there was a much smaller sex difference in reflection than brooding. The meta-analyses found similar results across multiple study designs.

=== Healthy self-disclosure ===
Although rumination is generally unhealthy and associated with depression, thinking and talking about one's feelings can be beneficial under the right conditions. According to Pennebaker, healthy self-disclosure can reduce distress and rumination when it leads to greater insight and understanding about the source of one's problems. Thus, when people share their feelings with others in the context of supportive relationships, they are likely to experience growth. In contrast, when people repetitively ruminate and dwell on the same problem without making progress, they are likely to experience depression. Co-rumination is a process defined as "excessively discussing personal problems within a dyadic relationship", a construct that is relatively understudied in both its negative and positive trade-offs.

=== Pathology ===
Extensive research on the effects of rumination, or the tendency to self-reflect, shows that the negative form of rumination (associated with dysphoria) interferes with people's ability to focus on problem-solving and results in dwelling on negative thoughts about past failures. Evidence from studies suggests that the negative implications of rumination are due to cognitive biases, such as memory and attentional biases, which predispose ruminators to selectively devote attention to negative stimuli.

The organic causes of rumination are not fully understood. Research has identified the activation of certain regions in the brain's default mode networks as neural substrates of rumination, but the number of brain-imaging studies on rumination is limited.

The tendency to negatively ruminate is a significant risk factor for clinical depression. Not only are habitual ruminators more likely to become depressed, but experimental studies have demonstrated that people who are induced to ruminate experience greater depressed mood. There is also evidence that rumination is linked to general anxiety, post traumatic stress, binge drinking, eating disorders, and self-injurious behavior. Research suggests that rumination is somewhat associated with a higher frequency of non-suicidal self-injury, and more heavily associated with a history of non-suicidal self injury.

Rumination was originally believed to predict the duration of depressive symptoms. In other words, ruminating about problems was presumed to be a form of memory rehearsal which was believed to actually lengthen the experience of depression. The evidence now suggests that although rumination contributes to depression, it is not necessarily correlated with the duration of symptoms.

Research on the relationships between executive functions and rumination has yielded mixed results. Some studies have observed a negative correlation with two executive functioning abilities, set-shifting and inhibition, but the magnitudes of those relationships are unclear. Another study observed only one relationship between rumination and one executive function, specifically the ability to discard past information from working memory. Other studies, however, found no relationship between rumination and working memory.

== Theories ==
There are various models of rumination which focus on different aspects:

- negative emotions and/or the circumstances surrounding that emotion: Responsive Styles Theory, rumination on sadness model, five-factor model, negative cognitive style model, social phobia model;
- discrepancies between one's current and desired status: goal progress theory, conceptual evaluative model of rumination;
- the negative themes of uncontrollability and harm in metacognitions.

=== Response styles theory ===
Response styles theory (RST) initially defined rumination as passively and repetitively focusing on one's symptoms of depression and the possible causes and consequences of these symptoms. As evidence for this definition, rumination has been implicated in the development, maintenance, and aggravation of both depressive symptoms, as well as episodes of major depression. Recently, RST has expanded the definition of rumination beyond depression to include passive and repetitive focus on the causes, consequences, and symptoms of one's distress in general. This change was made because rumination has been implicated in a host of disorders, not just depression.

RST also contends that positive distraction is the healthy alternative to rumination, where focus is directed to positive stimuli instead of to distress. However, the literature suggests that positive distraction may not be as potent a tool as once thought.

Specifically, the S-REF model defines rumination as "repetitive thoughts generated by attempts to cope with self-discrepancy that are directed primarily toward processing the content of self-referent information and not toward immediate goal-directed action." Put more simply, when a person ruminates, they aim to answer questions such as:

- How do I feel about this event?
- How can I change my thoughts and feelings about the event?
- How can I prevent disturbing thoughts and feelings in the future?

However, in answering these questions, ruminators tend to focus on their emotions (i.e., "self-referent information") as opposed to problem solving (i.e., "goal-directed action").

Meta-cognition is also an important part of the S-REF model and helps to explain the link between rumination and depression. Specifically, those who hold "positive meta-cognitive beliefs" about rumination (to make sense of negative thoughts and emotions or ensure the prevention of the same) are perhaps initially motivated to engage in rumination with high perseverance. However, individuals who have engaged themselves in positive acts of rumination were more likely to use rumination as a coping mechanism upon encountering negative emotions. This causes the individual to modify their perception of rumination as unpleasant, unmanageable and "socially damaging" in general. Rumination additionally has a tendency to magnify with an up-regulation of emotions in the body, thus beginning the downward-moving spiral of depression. The individual's "negative meta-cognitive" beliefs then contribute to the development and maintenance of depression.

=== Goal progress theory ===
Goal progress theory (GPT), sometimes referred to as Control Theory, seeks to explain rumination as a function of goal progress. Specifically, GPT views rumination as an example of the Zeigarnik Effect, which suggests that individuals are more likely to remember information from unfinished tasks than from finished tasks. From this understanding, GPT defines rumination as "the tendency to think recurrently about important, higher order goals that have not yet been attained" or towards which sufficient progress has not been made.

GPT predicts that individuals for whom goal-related information is highly accessible should be more likely to ruminate. Various studies have provided support for this prediction. However, the rumination experienced is focused more towards problem solving than rumination described by RST.

== Measurement ==
There are multiple tools for measuring rumination. These include the following:

The tendency to ruminate can be assessed with the Ruminative Responses Scale of the Response Styles Questionnaire. On this measure, people are asked to indicate how often they engage in 22 ruminative thoughts or behaviors when they feel sad or blue.

The Rumination On Sadness Scale is a self-report tool consisting of 13 items that uses the Likert Scale to measure rumination of sadness.

The 31-item Repetitive Thinking Questionnaire (RTQ) measures worry, rumination, and post-event processing with the purpose of controlling for effects associated with a psychological diagnosis or disorder. It includes two subscales, Repetitive Negative Thinking (RNT) and Absence of Repetitive Thinking (ART). RNT is associated with anxiety, depression, and other negative emotions as it influences metacognitive beliefs, cognitive avoidance strategies, and maladaptive thought control strategies. The ART subscale reflects the absence of those negative emotions associated with the RNT subscale, essentially measuring their opposites.

The Rumination-Reflection Scale involves 24 items. Half of the questions look for adaptive reflective thought while the other half note self-rumination focus. This scale incorporates the Likert Scale.

Recently, researchers have started to develop a validated measurement protocol to best assess rumination in a dynamic fashion using experience sampling methodology.

== Treatment ==
=== Rumination-focused cognitive behavioral therapy (RFCBT) ===
Some studies have begun developing a type of cognitive behavioral therapy that focuses on rumination. Rumination-focused cognitive behavior therapy (RFCBT) aims to teach patients to recognize when they begin to ruminate and ultimately re-frame the way they view themselves. The theories behind RFCBT as a treatment for rumination emphasize the fact that rumination is a destructive habit, and is mostly due to an individual's abstract cognitive processing. The approach that a therapist takes is to work with their client to change their thoughts into a healthy style of thinking. Instead of clients allowing negative repetitive thoughts to take over their daily life, therapists suggest that they process them into constructive thinking, which are helpful, process-focused, and concrete thoughts. In practice, this can look like the therapist prompting a client to replace their abstract ruminating "why" questions with more concrete "how" questions, that can be more easily examined and answered. Support for these interventions has come from a multitude of studies, suggesting that implementation of both individualized and group RFCBT has been correlated with lower rumination in adolescents and young adults, both with and without major depression or anxiety disorders.

=== Mindfulness-based intervention (MBI) ===
As mentioned in the lead section, rumination associates with other negative mental health conditions. Depression is one of mental diseases that are cause by genetic, environmental, and mental factors that experience ruminative thoughts. Mindfulness-based intervention can decrease the symptoms of rumination, as demonstrated by several meta-analyses of randomized controlled trials. The process of mindfulness based intervention is: (1) the interest in acceptance, (2) the defusion of thoughts and emotions, (3) the importance of being in the present moment, (4) self as context. These mechanisms gives the ability to not suppress or avoid emotions but to encounter them without giving judgment.

Further, research has shown that psychological stress and other negative emotions activate physiological pathways involved in the stress response including the hypothalamic–pituitary–adrenal (HPA) axis, with rumination on stressors repeatedly reactivating these responses. In contrast, the present-moment focus cultivated through mindfulness meditation appear to attenuate this process.

Specifically, the process of Mindfulness-based stress reduction (MBSR) has been generally correlated with lower rumination symptoms in both patients with various mental disorders and healthy patients. This process includes practices like meditation, body scans, and other nonjudgmental methods, mainly focusing on breath and passing thoughts. These practices can help individuals either let their ruminating thoughts arise and pass, or reduce dwelling on them, gently redirecting attention onto a present-moment meditation object such as the breath.

== Relationship to other related constructs ==
Rumination has been confounded with other similar constructs that may overlap with it. Worry, negative automatic thoughts, and avoidance are a few of them.

=== Worry ===
Rumination appears closely related to worry. Some models consider rumination to be a type of worry (S-REF). Worry has been identified as "a chain of thoughts and images, negatively affect-laden and relatively uncontrollable; it represents an attempt to engage in mental problem solving on an issue whose outcome is uncertain, but contains the possibility of one or more negative outcomes."

Worry is often studied in the context of generalized anxiety disorder (GAD), whereas rumination is often studied in the context of major depressive disorder. Because of the high comorbidity of these two conditions, more recent research is exploring the overlap of worry and rumination.

According to the Mental Health Foundation, rumination has been identified to be one of the main problems that leads to anxiety and depression. A study conducted by psychologists from the University of Liverpool suggests that dwelling on negative events that have occurred in one's life is the biggest predictor of depression and anxiety.

Measures of rumination and worry have also demonstrated high correlations, above and beyond that of symptom measures of anxiety and depression (r=.66; Beck & Perkins, 2001). Rumination and worry overlap in their relationships to anxiety and depression, although some studies do indicate specificity of rumination to depression and worry to anxiety. Rumination has been found to predict changes in both depression and anxiety symptoms and individuals with major depression have been reported to engage in levels of worry similar to individuals with GAD. As a whole, these studies suggest that rumination and worry are related not only to each other, but also each is related to symptoms of both depression and anxiety.

Other studies have demonstrated that the content of worry and rumination are distinct; worry thoughts are often focused on problem-solving and have a future orientation, whereas ruminative thoughts concern themes of loss and are more focused on the past. Rumination, as compared to worry, has also been associated with less effort and less confidence in problem solving (Papageorgiou & Wells, 2004). It has also been suggested that rumination and worry serve different purposes, namely that rumination is associated with greater belief in the personal relevance of a situation and a larger need to understand it, whereas worry is associated with a desire to avoid worry thoughts (Watkins 2004b). Worry has also been hypothesized to contain more imagery than rumination; however, support for this has been mixed.

Overall, these studies suggest that worry and rumination are related constructs that both lead to depression and anxiety. It is likely that rumination and worry, as with rumination and reflection, are related types of repetitive negative thinking that may be better captured as subtypes of some larger construct, such as avoidant coping strategies.

=== Automatic negative thoughts ===
Rumination has been compared to automatic negative thoughts, defined as repetitive thoughts that contain themes of personal loss or failure.

Nolen-Hoeksema (2004) contends that rumination (as defined in RST) is distinct from negative automatic thoughts in that while automatic negative thoughts are relatively shorthand appraisals of loss and depression in depression, rumination consists of longer chains of repetitive, recyclic, negative and self-focused thinking that may occur as a response to initial negative thoughts. Nolen-Hoeksema also suggests that rumination may, in addition to analysis of symptoms, causes, and consequences, contain negative themes like those in automatic thoughts. Similarly, Papageorgiou and Wells (2004) have provided support to this conclusion when they found that rumination can predict depression even when negative cognitions are controlled, suggesting that these constructs do not wholly overlap and have different predictive value.

Despite Nolen-Hoeksema's (2004) argument that rumination and negative automatic thoughts are distinct phenomena, the Response Style Questionnaire has been criticized for its conceptual overlap with negative automatic thoughts.

=== Avoidance ===
Avoidance can overlap with the habit of rumination, particularly because rumination is an avoidant action in itself. Simply because the action of actively avoiding certain thoughts is difficult to achieve without ending up in rumination, the very practice of thought avoidance can increase rumination, even though the idea of avoiding thoughts and ruminating on them seem to be in complete opposition. There is evidence to support this idea, with studies supporting the fact that unsuccessful attempts to suppress particular thoughts are significantly related with strong rumination tendencies in some individuals.

=== Comorbid disorders ===
Research has determined that rumination is highly correlated with various psychiatric disorders. Disorders related to high rumination behaviors include major depressive disorder, generalized anxiety disorder, social anxiety disorder, and anorexia nervosa. Individuals struggling with these disorders, when compared to individuals with no mental health issues, reported higher rates of rumination. In addition to these, individuals with obsessive–compulsive disorder (OCD) experience rumination as a compulsion, meaning individuals compulsively ruminate over thoughts and worries related to their obsessions. Rumination is considered one of the central cognitive symptoms of scrupulosity. People with borderline personality disorder may ruminate extensively about their interpersonal challenges, exacerbating negative emotions.

== See also ==
- Ad nauseam
- Compulsive behavior
- Intrusive thought
- Obsessive–compulsive disorder
- Ovsiankina effect
- Perseverative cognition
- Self-deprecation

== Sources ==
- Clark M, Wells A (1995). "A cognitive model of social phobia". In Heimberg R, Liebowitz M, Hope D, Schneier F (eds.). Social phobia: diagnosis, assessment, and treatment. London: Guilford Publications. ISBN 1-57230-012-4.
- Feldhaus, Claudia G.; Jacobs, Rachel H.; Watkins, Edward R.; Peters, Amy T.; Bessette, Katie L.; Langenecker, Scott A. (28 April 2020). "Rumination-Focused Cognitive Behavioral Therapy Decreases Anxiety and Increases Behavioral Activation Among Remitted Adolescents". Journal of Child and Family Studies. 29 (7): 1982–1991. doi:10.1007/s10826-020-01711-7. ISSN 1062-1024. PMC 7968389. PMID 33737799.
- Li, Pan; Mao, Lingyun; Hu, Maorong; Lu, Zihang; Yuan, Xin; Zhang, Yanyan; Hu, Zhizhong (January 2022). "Mindfulness on Rumination in Patients with Depressive Disorder: A Systematic Review and Meta-Analysis of Randomized Controlled Trials". International Journal of Environmental Research and Public Health. 19 (23) 16101. Bibcode:2022IJERP..1916101L. doi:10.3390/ijerph192316101. ISSN 1660-4601. PMC 9737922. PMID 36498174.
- Martin L, Shrira I, Startup H (2004). "Rumination as a Function of Goal Progress, Stop Rules, and Cerebral Lateralization". In Papageorgiou C, Wells A (eds.). Depressive Rumination: Nature, Theory and Treatment. West Sussex: John Wiley & Sons. pp. 153–175. doi:10.1002/9780470713853.ch (inactive 16 July 2026). ISBN 978-0-470-71385-3.
- Matthews, G.; Wells, A. (2004). "Rumination, Depression, and Metacognition: The S-REF Model". In Papageorgiou, C; Wells, A. (eds.). Depressive Rumination: Nature, Theory and Treatment. West Sussex: John Wiley & Sons. pp. 125–151. doi:10.1002/9780470713853.ch7. ISBN 978-0-470-71385-3.
- Nolan, S.A.; Roberts, J.E.; Gotlib, I.H. (1998). "Neuroticism and ruminative response style as predictors of change in depressive symptomatology" (PDF). Cognitive Therapy and Research. 22 (5): 445–455. doi:10.1023/A:1018769531641. S2CID 15419457.
- Nolen-Hoeksema, Susan (1991). "Responses to depression and their effects on the duration of depressive episodes". Journal of Abnormal Psychology. 100 (4): 569–582. doi:10.1037/0021-843X.100.4.569. PMID 1757671.
- Nolen-Hoeksema, S.; Wisco, B.E.; Lyubomirsky, S. (September 2008). "Rethinking Rumination". Perspectives on Psychological Science. 3 (5): 400–424. doi:10.1111/j.1745-6924.2008.00088.x. PMID 26158958. S2CID 6415609.
- Papageorgiou, C.; Wells, A. (2004). "Nature, Functions, and Beliefs about Depressive Rumination". In Papageorgiou, C.; Wells, A. (eds.). Depressive Rumination: Nature, Theory and Treatment. West Sussex: John Wiley & Sons. pp. 1–20. doi:10.1002/9780470713853.ch1. ISBN 978-0-470-71385-3.
- Robinson, M.; Alloy, L. (2003). "Negative cognitive styles and stress-reactive rumination interact to predict depression: a prospective study". Cognitive Therapy and Research. 27 (3): 275–291. doi:10.1023/A:1023914416469. S2CID 13358745.
- Salamon, Maureen (2024). "Break the cycle". Harvard Health Publishing.
- Smith, Jeannette M.; Alloy, Lauren B. (1 March 2009). "A roadmap to rumination: A review of the definition, assessment, and conceptualization of this multifaceted construct". Clinical Psychology Review. 29 (2): 116–128. doi:10.1016/j.cpr.2008.10.003. ISSN 0272-7358. PMC 2832862. PMID 19128864.
- Trapnell, D.; Campbell, D. (1999). "Private self-consciousness and the five-factor model of personality: distinguishing rumination from reflection". Journal of Personality and Social Psychology. 76 (2): 284–304. doi:10.1037/0022-3514.76.2.284. PMID 10074710.
- Vigliotti, Amy (2024). "How to Break the Cycle of Rumination". Psychology Today.
- Watkins, E.R. (March 2008). "Constructive and unconstructive repetitive thought". Psychological Bulletin. 134 (2): 163–206. Bibcode:2008PsycB.134..163W. doi:10.1037/0033-2909.134.2.163. PMC 2672052. PMID 18298268.
