= Co-rumination =

Theory

The theory of co-rumination refers to extensively discussing and revisiting problems, speculating about problems, and focusing on negative feelings with peers. Although it is similar to self-disclosure in that it involves revealing and discussing a problem, it is more focused on the problems themselves and thus can be maladaptive. While self-disclosure is seen in this theory as a positive aspect found in close friendships, some types of self-disclosure can also be maladaptive. Co-rumination is a type of behavior that is positively correlated with both rumination and self-disclosure and has been linked to a history of anxiety because co-ruminating may exacerbate worries about whether problems will be resolved, about negative consequences of problems, and depressive diagnoses due to the consistent negative focus on troubling topics, instead of problem-solving. However, co-rumination has been found in to be also closely associated with high-quality friendships and closeness. Recent work offers a re-conceptualization of co-rumination that expands beyond adolescence and considers important contextual and societal forces that impact the outcomes of co-rumination, particularly moving away from always framing it as "maladaptive."

== Developmental psychology and gender differences ==
According to these hypothesized dynamics, girls are more likely than boys to co-ruminate with their close friends, and co-rumination increases with age in children. Female adolescents are more likely to co-ruminate than younger girls because their social worlds become increasingly complex and stressful. This is not true for boys, however as age differences are not expected among boys because their interactions remain activity-focused and the tendency to extensively discuss problems is likely to remain inconsistent with male norms.

Unfortunately, while providing this support, this tendency may also reinforce internalizing problems such as anxiety or depression, especially in adolescent girls, which may account for higher depression among girls than boys. For boys, lower levels of co-rumination may help buffer them against emotional problems if they spend less time with friends dwelling on problems and concerns, though less sharing of personal thoughts and feelings can potentially interfere with creating high-quality friendships.

Co-rumination has been found to partially explain (or mediate) gender differences in anxiety and depression; females have reported engaging in more co-rumination in close friendships than males, as well as elevated co-rumination was associated with females' higher levels of depression, but not anxiety. Co-rumination is also linked with romantic activities, which have been shown to correlate with depressive symptoms over time, because they are often the problem discussed among adolescents.

Research suggests that within adolescents, children who currently exhibit high levels of co-rumination would predict the onset of depressive diagnoses than children who exhibit lower levels of co-rumination. In addition, this link was maintained even when children with current diagnoses were excluded, as well as statistically controlling for current depressive symptoms. This further suggests that the relation between co-rumination and a history of depressive diagnoses is not due simply to current levels of depression. Another study looking at 146 adolescents (69% female) ranging in age from 14 to 19 suggests that comparing gender differences in co-rumination across samples, it appears as if these differences intensify through early adolescence but begin to narrow shortly thereafter and remain steady through emerging adulthood

== Stress hormones, co-rumination and depression ==
Co-rumination, or talking excessively about each other's problems, is common during adolescent years, especially among girls, as mentioned before. On a biological basis, a study has shown that there is an increase in the levels of stress hormones during co-rumination. This suggests that since stress hormones are released during co-rumination, they may also be released in greater amounts during other life stressors. If someone exhibits co-rumination in response to a life problem it may become more and more common for them to co-ruminate about all problems in their life.

Studies have also shown that co-rumination can predict internalizing symptoms such as depression and anxiety. Since co-rumination involves repeatedly going over problems again and again this clearly may lead to depression and anxiety. Catastrophizing, when one takes small possibilities and blows them out of proportion into something negative, is common in depression and anxiety and may very well be a result of constantly going over problems that may not be as bad as they seem.

== Effects in daily life ==
Co-rumination, or lack thereof, leads to different behaviors in daily life. For example, studies have examined the link between co-rumination and weekly drinking habits, specifically, negative thoughts. Worry co-rumination leads to less drinking weekly, while angry co-rumination leads to a significant increase in drinking. There have also been some gender differences found as well in the same study. In general, negative co-rumination increased the likelihood that women would binge drink weekly, versus men who would drink less weekly. When dealing with specific negative emotions, women drank less when taking part in worry co-rumination (as opposed to other negative emotions), while there appeared to be a lack of significant difference in men. (Ciesla et al., 2011)

== Therapy ==
Co-rumination treatment typically consists of cognitive emotion regulation therapy for rumination with the patient. This therapy focuses both on the patient themselves and their habits of continually co-ruminating with a friend or friends. Therapies may need to be altered depending on the gender of each patient. As suggested by Zlomke and Hahn (2010) men showed vast improvement in anxiety and worrying symptoms by focusing their attention on how to handle a negative event through "refocus on planning". For women, accepting a negative event/emotion and re-framing it in a positive light was associated with decreased levels of worry. In other words, some of the cognitive emotion regulation strategies that work for men do not necessarily work for women and vice versa. Patients are encouraged to talk about their problems with friends and family members, but need to focus on a solution instead of focusing on the exact problem.

== Types of relationships ==
While the majority of studies have been conducted with youth same-sex friendships, others have explored co-rumination and correlates of co-rumination within other types of relationships. Research on co-rumination in the workplace has shown that discussions about workplace problems have led to mixed results, especially regarding gender differences. In high abusive supervision settings, the effects of co-rumination were shown to intensify its negative effects for women, while associating lower negative effects for men. In low abusive supervision settings, results show that there were no significant effects for women, but had negative outcomes for men. The study suggests the reason men are at risk for job dissatisfaction and depression in low stress supervision, is due to the gender differences at an early age. At a young age, girls report to co-ruminate more than boys, and as they age girls' scores tend to rise, while boys' scores tend to drop. The study further suggests that in adulthood, men have less experience with co-rumination than women, however some men may learn skills through interacting with women or the interaction style with other men in adulthood has changed from activity-based to conversation-based; suggesting that not only do men and women co-ruminate differently, but that the level of stress may be a factor as well. In another study, co-rumination was seen to increase the negative effects of burnout on perceived stress among co-workers, thereby indicating that, while co-rumination may be seen as a socially-supportive interaction, it could have negative psychological outcomes for co-workers.

Within the context of mother-adolescent relationships, a study that examines 5th, 8th, and 11th graders has found greater levels of co-rumination among mother and daughter than mother and son relationships. In addition, mother-adolescent co-rumination was related to positive relationship quality, but also to enmeshment which was unique to co-rumination. These enmeshment as well as internalizing relations were strongest when co-ruminating was focused on the mother's problems.

Other relationships have also been studied. For instance, one study found that graduate students engage in co-rumination. Furthermore, for those graduate students, co-rumination acted as a partial mediator, which suppressed the positive effects of social support on emotional exhaustion.

== Primary researchers ==
Researchers in psychology and communication have studied the conceptualization of co-rumination along with the effects of the construct. A few primary researchers have focused attention on the construct including Amanda Rose Professor of Psychology at the University of Missouri, who was one of the first scholars to write about the construct. Others who are doing work on co-rumination include Justin P. Boren, Associate Professor of Communication at Santa Clara University, Jennifer Byrd-Craven, associate professor of psychology at Oklahoma State University, and Dana L. Haggard, professor of management at Missouri State University, and Ana M. DiGiovanni, Assistant Professor of Psychology at Montclair State University.

== See also ==
- Developmental psychology
