= Wednesday Martin =

American writer

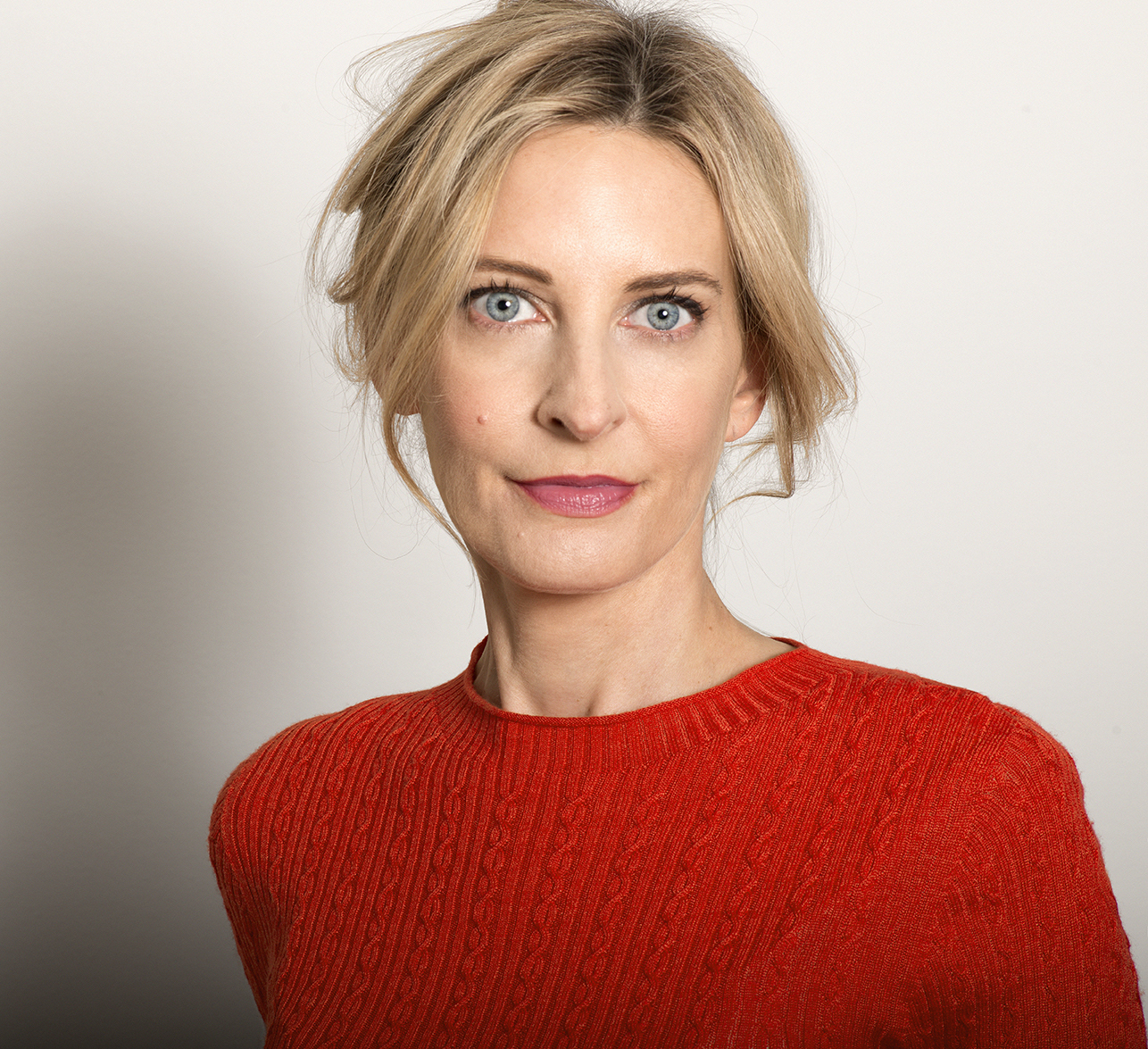
- Born: Wendy K. Martin; 1965 or 1966 (age 59–60); Ann Arbor, Michigan, U.S.
- Education: University of Michigan; Yale University
- Occupations: Author; cultural critic; social researcher
- Spouse: Joel Moser
- Writing career
- Language: English
- Period: 1995–present
- Genres: memoir, social commentary, cultural criticism, biography
- Notable works: Primates of Park Avenue; Stepmonster: A New Look at Why Real Stepmothers Think, Feel and Act the Way We Do
- Website: wednesdaymartin.com

Wendy "Wednesday" Martin is an American author and cultural critic who writes and comments on parenting, step-parenting, female sexuality, motherhood, and popular culture. She has written several books and for The New York Times, The Atlantic, Psychology Today, The Huffington Post, Harper's Bazaar, and The Daily Telegraph.

== Early life and education ==
Martin was born in Ann Arbor, Michigan and grew up in Grand Rapids, Michigan. She did her undergraduate work at the University of Michigan where she studied anthropology, and she received a doctorate in comparative literature and cultural studies from Yale University. Her doctoral work examined early psychoanalysis and anthropology.

== Work ==
Martin has taught literature and cultural studies at Yale, The New School, and Baruch College.

In May 2009, Martin's memoir about her experience as a stepmother called Stepmonster: A New Look at Why Real Stepmothers Think, Feel and Act the Way We Do was published.

After Martin moved to the Upper East Side neighborhood of Manhattan with her family in 2004, she began researching and documenting her experiences there for her next book, Primates of Park Avenue. Simon & Schuster released the book in June 2015. The memoir recounted Martin's experience living among the wealthy women, particularly stay-at-home mothers, of the Upper East Side and examined their behavior from a social researcher's perspective, inspired by the work of Jane Goodall. Primates has been translated into nine languages, as of 2018.

In her book Untrue (2018), Martin focused on female sexuality and addressing untruths about women and sex.

Martin has also written for Psychology Today, The Daily Telegraph, The New York Times, The Huffington Post, and The Atlantic.

== Publications ==
Martin is the author of the following books and ebooks:

- Martin, Wednesday (1995). Marlene Dietrich. New York: Chelsea House Publ. ISBN 0-7910-2881-X.
- Martin, Wednesday (2009). Stepmonster: A New Look at Why Real Stepmothers Think, Feel and Act the Way We Do. New York: Houghton Mifflin Harcourt. ISBN 978-0-618-75819-7.
- Martin, Wednesday (2015). Primates of Park Avenue: a memoir (First Simon & Schuster hardcover ed.). New York: Simon & Schuster. ISBN 978-1-4767-6271-5.
- Martin, Wednesday (2018). Untrue: Why Nearly Everything We Believe About Women, Lust, and Infidelity is Wrong and How the New Science Can Set Us Free. New York/Boston/London: Little, Brown Spark. ISBN 978-0-316-46361-4.
- Martin, Wednesday (2018). Boyfriends of Dorothy. Amazon Original Stories. ASIN B078XB11K1.
- Martin, Wednesday (2018). The Button. Amazon Original Stories. ASIN B07DNQVCPR.

== Reception ==
In May 2013, several articles were published about the practice of hiring disabled guides to avoid lines at Disney World, which Martin uncovered during her research for Primates of Park Avenue. On May 16, 2015, The New York Times published an essay by Martin in the Sunday Review section, titled "Poor Little Rich Women", prior to the publication of her book Primates of Park Avenue. The article received coverage from numerous media outlets, in particular the concept of financial rewards called "wife bonuses", which Martin reported some Upper East Side wives receive from their husbands for superior domestic performance. The New York Times characterized Martin's description of wife bonuses as "disputed".

In 2015, the New York Post claimed to have found multiple factual discrepancies with Martin's memoir Primates of Park Avenue. In response, Simon & Schuster promised to add a note by Martin to subsequent editions of the book, clarifying that some chronologies and details were changed.

== Personal life ==
Martin is married to Joel Moser, a lawyer, financier, chief executive officer, and adjunct professor at Columbia University, with whom she has two sons, one born in 2001 and the other in 2007. She has two step-daughters, children of Moser's first marriage.
