= White knight =

Literary stock character

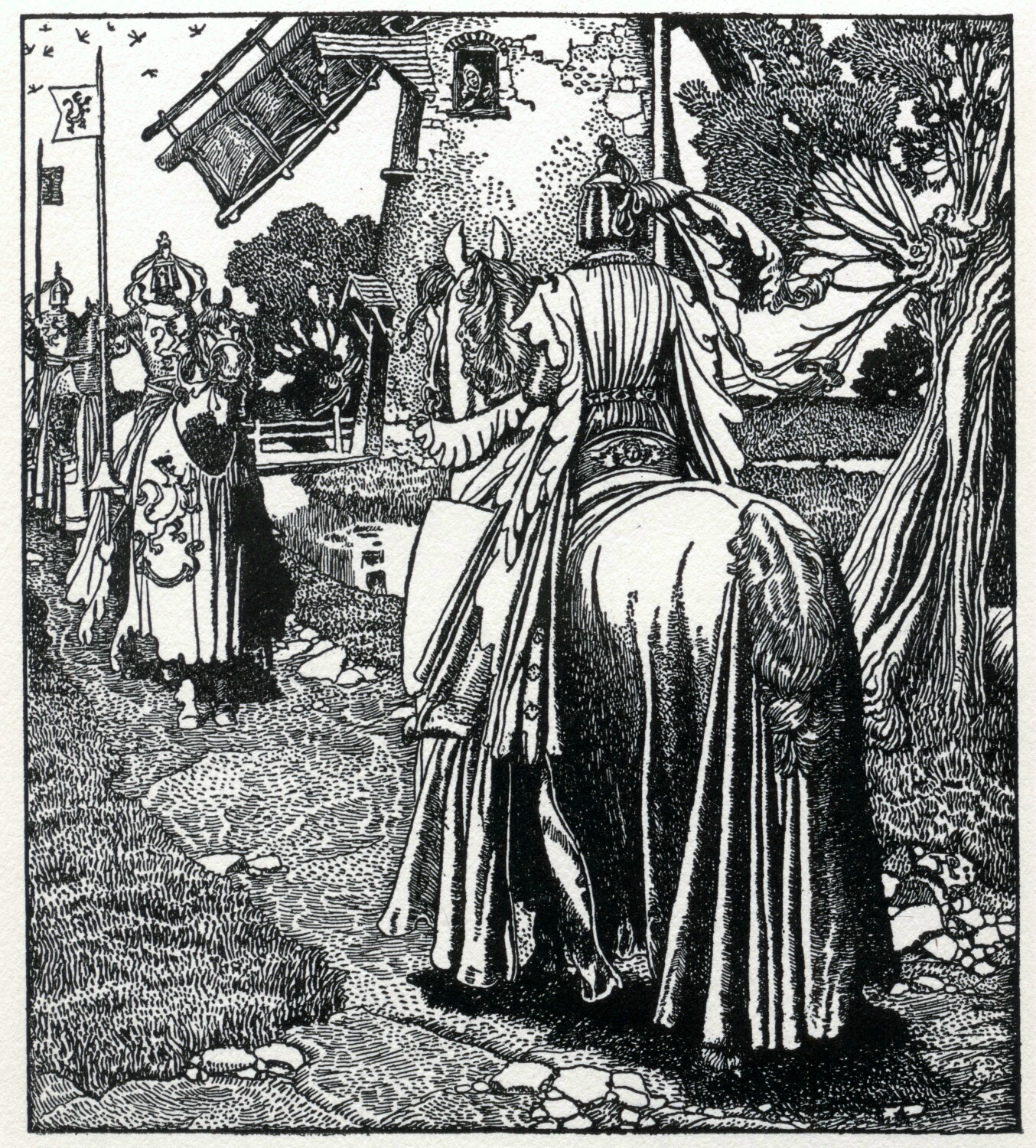
"The White Champion meets Two Knights at the Mill". Howard Pyle's illustration from the 1903 edition of The Story of King Arthur and His Knights

A white knight is a mythological figure and literary stock character. They are portrayed alongside a black knight as diametric opposites. A white knight usually represents a heroic warrior fighting against evil, with the role in medieval literature being represented by a knight-errant.

== Mythology ==
The idea of a positive and negative color symbol being diametrically opposed is very common in ancient mythology, of which the white and black knights are one example, with others including the white horse and black horse from Indo-Aryan mythology. The white color symbolized innocence, illumination, openheartedness, and gladness.

== Modern use ==
The term "white knight" is used in modern-day parlance to mean any kind of savior, although it is also specifically used in a business context to describe a person or corporation that saves another company from a hostile takeover and acquires its assets.

In various online communities (most notably within the manosphere), "white knight" is used as a slang term, referring to men who attempt to gain the favor of women by defending them; often used alongside similar terms such as "simp" or "whipped". The usage of the term implies that these men are motivated by the prospect of a sexual or romantic relationship with that woman rather than a genuine belief in doing what is right.

== Historical usage ==
Although the term 'white knight' has taken on a colloquial meaning in modern English, the White Knight was a historical noble title in the peerage of Ireland, first bestowed upon the Fitzgibbon family by King Edward III in 1333 AD. The other two Irish hereditary knighthoods are the Knight of Glin (also called the Black Knight), and the Knight of Kerry (also called the Green Knight).

== See also ==
- Chivalry
- Damsel in distress
- Savior complex
- White savior
