= Superman complex =

Unhealthy sense of personal responsibility

In popular psychology, a Superman complex is an unhealthy sense of responsibility, or the belief that everyone else lacks the capacity to successfully perform one or more tasks. Such a person may feel a constant need to "save" others and, in the process, takes on more work on their own.

The expression seems to have been first used by German-American psychiatrist Fredric Wertham in his 1954 book Seduction of the Innocent and his testimony before the Senate Subcommittee on Juvenile Delinquency. His initial theory focused less on the current allusion to the savior complex and more on people's propensity to find enjoyment in watching someone else beat up another person while they stand by unharmed. He claimed that children reading Superman comic books were exposed to "Fantasies of sadistic joy in seeing other people punished over and over again while you yourself remain immune.” In his discourse of the Superman complex, Wertham also blamed comic books for other social phenomena such as juvenile delinquency, homosexuality, and Communism.

== See also ==
- Atlas personality
- God complex
- Hero syndrome
- Messiah complex
- Superiority complex
