= Rumination =

Rumination may refer to:

- Rumination, the digestive process of ruminants
  - Rumination syndrome, a chronic condition characterized by effortless regurgitation of most meals following consumption
- Deep thought or consideration
  - Rumination (psychology), contemplation or reflection, which may become persistent and recurrent worrying or brooding
  - Ruminations, an email column and series of books written by comedian Aaron Karo
  - Ruminations (album), a 2016 album by American musician Conor Oberst
