= Covert incest =

Emotional, sexual, non physical type of child abuse

Covert incest is a form of non-physical sexual abuse.

Examples of covert incest could be the parent sharing intimate, graphic details of their own sex life to the child, practicing voyeurism, exhibitionism, inappropriate sharing of pornographic images, and similar behaviors that, while still being sexual abuse, are described as covert for their intangible nature. Covert incest is often difficult to detect.

Covert incest is often used synonymously with the controversial term emotional incest. Emotional incest, more often described as enmeshment or "surrogate spouse syndrome", refers to a type of harmful relationship in which a parent looks to their child for the emotional support that would be normally provided by another adult. This term describes interactions between a parent and child that are exclusive of sexual abuse.

== Concept ==
Covert incest was defined in the 1980s as an emotionally abusive relationship between a parental figure and child that does not involve incest or sexual intercourse, though it involves similar interpersonal dynamics as a relationship between sexual partners.

Defining such relationships as "incest" has led to criticism of the concept for dramatically loosening the definition of incest, making child abuse seem more prevalent than it actually is and being overused and unsubstantiated.

Covert incest is described as occurring when a parent is unable or unwilling to maintain a relationship with another adult and forces the emotional role of a spouse onto their child instead. The child's needs are ignored and instead the relationship exists solely to meet the needs of the parent and the adult may not be aware of the problems created by their actions.

The effects of covert incest are thought to mimic actual incest, though to a lesser degree. Kenneth Adams, who originated the concept, describes the victims as having anger or guilt towards parents and problems with self-esteem, addiction, and sexual and emotional intimacy.

Psychotherapist Roni Weisberg-Ross has noted that the term may not be particularly useful, since it can lead to attributing nearly any possible dysfunctional relationship or problem, becoming "a catchall, watered-down diagnosis". Ross also criticizes the term for its emphasis on children meeting parents' "unmet needs", noting that children often meet the emotional or other needs of parents, with relationship boundaries frequently blurring and no definition of when this leads to permanent damage or harm.

Jungian analyst and author Marion Woodman describes covert incest as "unboundaried bonding" in which the parent or parents use the child as a mirror to support their needs, rather than mirroring the child in support of the child's emotional development.

Alcoholism and other substance addictions are also associated with the occurrence of covert incest.

== See also ==
- Atlas personality
- Parentification
