= Hero syndrome =

Desire for heroic praise

Hero syndrome (also often referred to as hero complex) is a psychological phenomenon which causes a person to seek recognition for heroism.

Although hero syndrome is not recognised by the American Academy of Psychiatry due to its inconsistency with the definition of a syndrome, it is, by definition, a complex, as people who present this often exhibit impulses that have a "common emotional tone and exert a strong but usually unconscious influence on the individual's attitudes and behavior". However, in popular media and literature, it is referred to as "hero syndrome". The term is used to describe individuals who constantly seek praise for valiant or philanthropic acts, especially by creating a harmful situation which they then can resolve. This can include unlawful acts such as arson. The term has been used to describe the behaviour of public servants, such as firefighters, nurses, police officers, security guards and politicians. The behaviour of individuals with hero syndrome can be detrimental to the lives of those around them, putting innocent people at risk in the pursuit of creating a "victim". Reasons for this kind of behaviour often vary.

The term "hero syndrome" was first introduced following the discovery of a bomb on the 1984 Turkish Olympic team's bus by Los Angeles police officer Jimmy Wade Pearson. He presented as the only police officer available on the scene after he "discovered" it. Pearson ripped the device's wires out before running it out onto a runway. He was hailed as a hero by the public until he was arrested the following day for planting the bomb himself. This raised questions as to people's desire to commit crimes to create scenarios for themselves to be the heroes.

== Aetiologies and contributing factors ==
=== Narcissism ===
The causes of hero syndrome are predominantly rooted in narcissistic tendencies. Narcissism usually presents itself in one of two ways: vulnerability-sensitivity and grandiose-exhibitionism. The latter is what is most often found to coincide with hero syndrome. Individuals with this form are often described as egotistical and show-offs and are aligned with high levels of manipulativeness and self-dramatisation. There is a deep desire to exhibit attention-seeking behaviour and impress others. A similar relevant concept is also referred to as overt narcissism in which people are constantly obsessed with the perception of themselves by others.

Due to high, fragile self-esteem and a failure to see fault in their own actions, narcissists are more susceptible to portraying others as the victims or villains in order to boost their image.

=== Cultural differences ===
The categorisation and characterisation of heroes differ between cultures, and as a result, create disparities in how hero syndrome may present itself in different circumstances.

The classification of heroes in individualistic cultures revolves largely around the idea of "rescuing" someone from harm by putting themselves in physically dangerous situations. "Heroes" in these cultures are considered brave, reliable, strong, etc. Furthermore, features that were critical to defining someone as a hero included: self-sacrifice, altruism and selflessness. In contrast, collectivistic cultures typically categorise heroes as those whose actions serve the collective goal. Heroes in collectivist cultures need to place the needs and interests of the group above their own. A sense of patriotism and nationalism in some cases may also be relevant in the construction of a "hero" in collectivist cultures.

These differences between cultural "hero" stereotypes may also translate to how hero syndrome may be portrayed. Violent crimes and physically dangerous situations may be therefore more prevalent in individualist societies due to the element of bravery and sacrifice involved.

== Examples and case studies ==
=== Firefighter arson ===
Firefighter arsonists include the very small proportion of firefighters who are dispatched to put out fires of which they were the cause; that is, fires intentionally set by firefighters so they can also gain the satisfaction and accolades of being the heroes and saviours of the incidents. In a federal study of more than 80 firefighter arsonists in the United States, the most common reason cited for starting the fire was simply the excitement of putting it out, not to cause harm or exact revenge. Though not all, many recall their motives for committing arson as wishing to be perceived as heroes to other firefighters and their community, committing what may be referred to as vanity fire setting.

=== Arkansas: Perry County Deputy Sheriff ===
In 2004, an Arkansas police officer reported as being in foot pursuit of a man whom he had recently called in to be on the lookout for. Not long after, the police officer announced he had been shot in the abdomen and gave a very detailed and comprehensive recount of the events that had transpired. An extensive investigation and search were then carried out, collecting evidence and conducting interviews, resulting in the officer eventually pleading guilty to fabricating the entire story and shooting himself. This crime was also committed with the intention of being a victim, simultaneously portraying himself as a hero injured in battle. Hero syndrome is often also found in conjunction with victim complex due to their similar ideals.

== Real-world applications ==
There is already-existing controversy about workplace and employment mental health screening due to the ethical concerns raised regarding biases, false negatives, etc. However, in certain fields where people display harmful and risky behaviour in an attempt to be perceived as saviours, ethics are also very relevant regarding the safety and harm of others.

=== Emergency services and healthcare workers ===
For first responders and those working in the medical field, hero syndrome is particularly relevant. These are careers often labelled as 'heroic' and have the potential to attract those with hero syndrome due to the constant ability to exhibit courageous and heroic acts. In such careers where agent–patient dynamics are prevalent, people assume the roles of saviour and victim, and heroes can emerge. Having individuals who suffer from hero syndrome in this field would increase the prevalence of self-inflicted incidents, creating a drain on resources of both time and people. In some cases, however, these careers fuel the hero syndrome, as individuals want to "show off" newly learnt skills, impressing those around them. To combat this, many emergency services, such as fire departments, are incorporating the teaching of the severity of crimes into programmes. For example, the fire departments rolled out additional teaching on arson crimes to reinforce the firefighters' duty to support and serve their community and to not bring shame and stigma to the fire department.

== See also ==
- Saviour complex
- Messiah complex
- Vigilantism
