= Laius complex =

Psychoanalytic terminology

The Laius complex revolves around the paternal wish for filicide, particularly for the extinction of the male heir, in an attempt to ensure one will have no successors.

== Mythological background ==
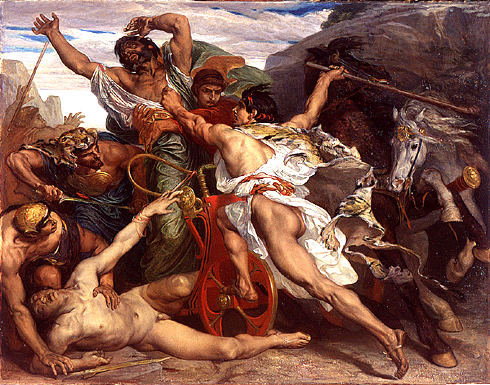
Joseph Blanc, Le meurtre de Laïus par Oedipe (1867)

Indo-European mythology contains a number of stories of foundlings, like Cyrus the Great or Romulus and Remus, outcast after a prophecy that they will replace the dynasty into which they are born. In Greek mythology, Cronus (Roman Saturn) had devoured his young because of his fear that one would supersede him. Laius in the story of Oedipus similarly casts the latter out to die as an infant because of (in the words of Sophocles) "some wicked spell … . Saying the child would kill its father".

== From myth to complex ==
Whereas Freud had laid stress on Oedipus's filial violence against his father, George Devereux in 1953 introduced the term 'Laius complex' to cover the corresponding feelings on the part of the father – what he called the "'counter-oedipal' (Laius) complex". Later explorations of masculinity have placed the aggressive aspects of the Laius complex within the broader frame of mammalian aggression against their young: what Gershon Legman called "the killing of the male (i.e. sexually uninteresting) children by the father".

Two specific psychosexual aspects of the complex have been particularly highlighted. One lays stress on the magical thinking behind the complex – the unconscious belief that if one has no successors, one will be effectively immortal. The other emphasises the narcissism in the Laius/Oedipus relationship – the belief that there is only room for a single figure to exist in life, leading inevitably to the destruction of the one or the other competitor, father or son.

How far the playing down of the Laius neurosis (in orthodox psychoanalysis) can be linked to what Julia Kristeva called Freud's "paternal vision of childhood", remains for the 21st century an open question. Bracha L. Ettinger introduced a Laius Complex 'per se', not in terms of 'counter-Oedipus' but prior to it, in the frame of feminist psychoanalysis in terms of the analyst's desire to destroy the patient and exploit its creativity and sexuality, not as a counter-transferential reaction to the patient (as 'son' or 'daughter'), but as a direct transference of the analyst toward the patient. Manifestations of such Laius Complex during treatment are, according to Ettinger, close to psychosis (not neurosis), and can lead to the production of psychotic folie-a-deux.

== See also ==
- Jocasta complex
- Otto Rank's The Myth of the Birth of the Hero (1909)
- Parentification
- Self-fulfilling prophecy
- Tiresias
