= Savior complex =

Belief that one is responsible for assisting others

In psychology, a savior complex is an attitude and demeanor in which a person believes they are responsible for assisting other people. A person with a savior complex will often experience empathic episodes and commit to impulsive decisions such as volunteering, donating, or advocating for a cause. A person with the complex will usually make an attempt to assist or continue to assist even if they are not helpful or are detrimental to the situation, others, or themselves.

It is often associated with other disorders, such as schizophrenia and bipolar disorder, and is commonly used interchangeably with the similar term 'Messiah complex'. Like Messiah complex, savior complex is not mentioned in the Diagnostic and Statistical Manual of Mental Disorders (DSM) and is not recognized as a clinical term or diagnosable condition.

== Examples ==
Savior complex is often seen in those who struggle with self-worth and exclusively feel good when helping other people. Some traits of this concept are:

- Attraction to vulnerability and codependency: Seeking relationships with those who appear to need some form of assistance or "fixing".
- A desire to change people: Wanting to change the actions and beliefs of others thinking that it would be beneficial for them, whether it truly is or not.
- Making excessive sacrifices: Often putting others in front of one's own needs, and being left drained. This ultimately leads to the "savior" being far less motivated and helpful than they want to appear.

== See also ==
- Hero syndrome
- Messiah complex
- Superman complex
- White knight
- White savior complex
