= Jocasta complex =

Type of sexual desire in psychoanalytic theory

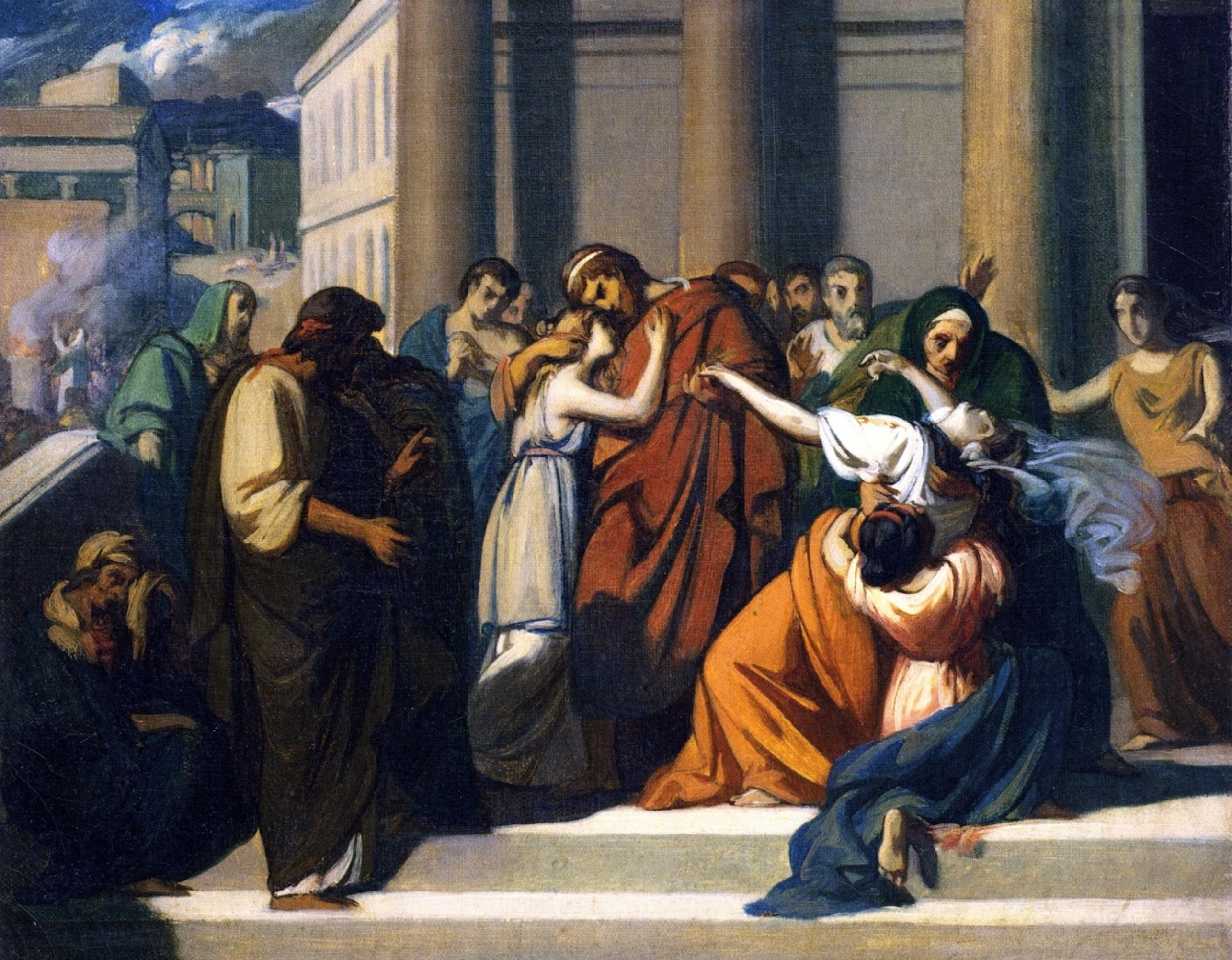
Oedipus Separating from Jocasta by Alexandre Cabanel

In psychoanalytic theory, the Jocasta complex is the incestuous sexual desire of a mother towards her son.

Raymond de Saussure introduced the term in 1920 by way of analogy to its logical converse in psychoanalysis, the Oedipus complex, and it may be used to cover different degrees of attachment, including domineering but asexual mother love – something perhaps particularly prevalent with an absent father.

== Origins ==
The Jocasta complex is named for Jocasta, the Queen of Thebes who unknowingly married her son, Oedipus, and eventually committed suicide. The Jocasta complex is similar to the Oedipus complex, in which a child has sexual desire towards his mother. The term is a bit of an extrapolation, since in the original story Oedipus and Jocasta were unaware that they were mother and son when they married. The usage in modern contexts involves a son with full knowledge of who his mother is.

== Analytic discussion ==
Theodor Reik saw the "Jocasta mother", with an unfulfilled adult relationship of her own and an over-concern for her child instead, as a prime source of neurosis.

George Devereux went further, arguing that the child's Oedipal complex was itself triggered by a pre-existing parental complex (Jocasta/Laius).

Eric Berne also explored the other (parental) side of the Oedipus complex, pointing to related family dramas such as "mother sleeping with daughter's boyfriend ... when mother has no son to play Jocasta with".

With her feminist articulation of Jocasta Complex and Laius complex Bracha L. Ettinger criticises the classical psychoanalytic perception of Jocasta, of the maternal, the feminine, and the Oedipal/castration model in relation to the mother-child links.

== Cultural analogues ==
- Atossa, in the Greek tragedy The Persians, has been seen as struggling in her dreams with a Jocasta complex.
- Some American folk-tales often feature figures, like Jocasta, expressing maternal desire for their sons.
- Psycho (1960 movie)
- The House That Screamed (1969 movie)
- Butcher, Baker, Nightmare Maker (1981 movie)
- Bates Motel (2013 TV series)
- Do You Love Your Mom and Her Two-Hit Multi-Target Attacks? (Japanese Light novel)

== See also ==
- Covert incest
- Laius complex
- Parentification
- Phaedra complex
- Oedipus complex
- Electra complex
