= Atlas personality =

Personality trait found in those who took on adult responsibilities early

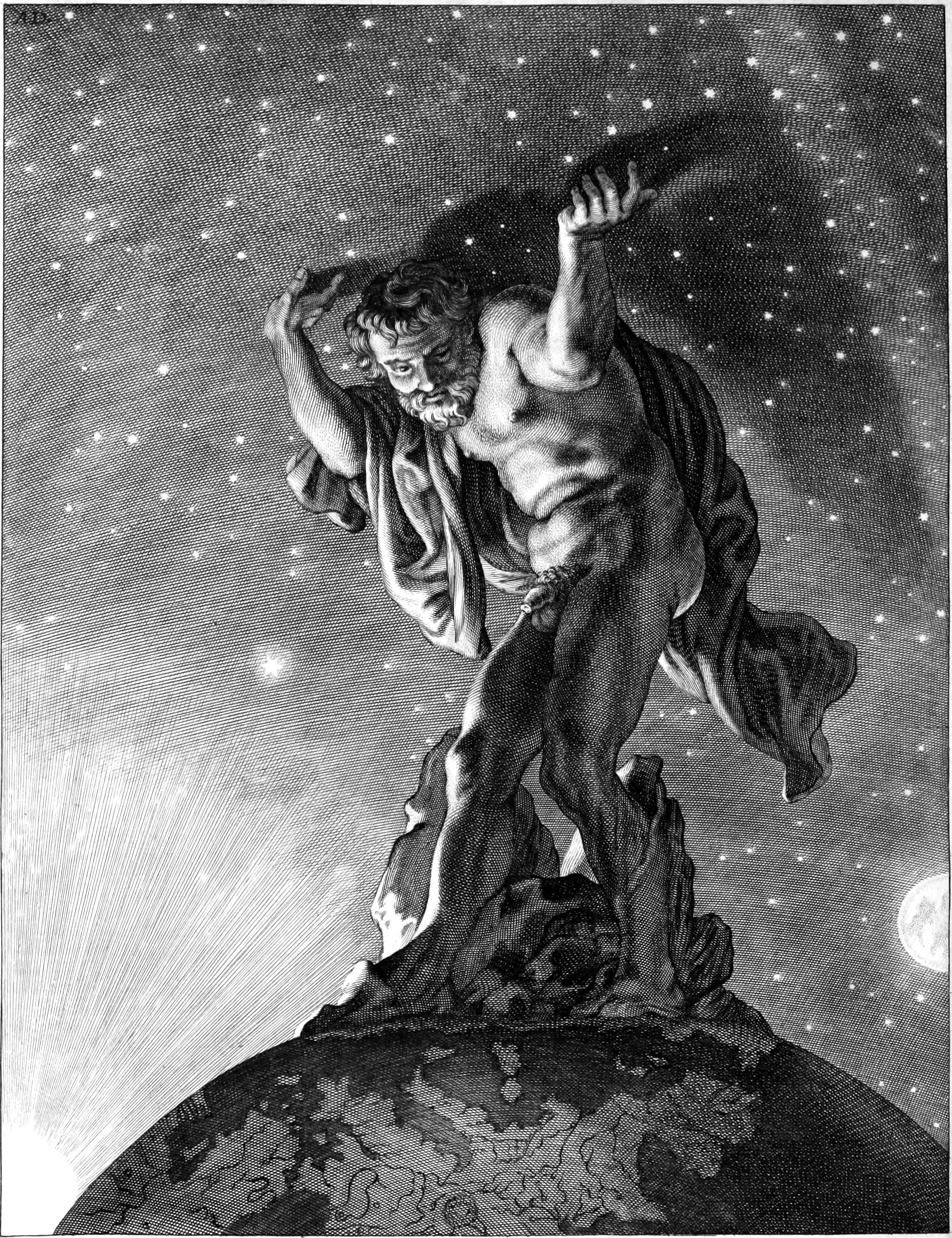
Atlas supporting the heavens

The Atlas personality, named after the story of the Titan Atlas from Greek mythology who is forced to hold up the sky, is someone obliged to take on adult responsibilities prematurely. They are as a result liable to develop a pattern of compulsive caregiving in later life.

== Origins and nature ==
The Atlas personality is typically found in a person who felt obliged during childhood to take on responsibilities such as providing psychological support to parents, often in a chaotic family situation. This experience often involves parentification.

The result in adult life can be a personality devoid of fun, and feeling the weight of the world on their shoulders. Depression and anxiety, as well as oversensitivity to others and an inability to assert their own needs, are further identifiable characteristics. In addition, there may also be an underlying rage against the parents for not having provided love, and for exploiting the child for their own needs.

While Atlas personalities may appear to function adequately as adults, they may be pervaded with a sense of emptiness and be lacking in vitality.

== See also ==
- Codependency
- Parentification
- Sandor Ferenczi
- Superman complex
- Traumatic bonding
