= Parentification =

Process of role reversal in the parent-child relation

Parentification or parent–child role reversal is the process of role reversal whereby a child or adolescent is obliged to support the family system in ways that are developmentally inappropriate and overly burdensome. For example, it is developmentally appropriate for even a very young child to help adults prepare a meal for the family to eat, but it is not developmentally appropriate for a young child to be required to provide and prepare food for the whole family alone.

However, if the task is developmentally appropriate, such as a young child fetching an item for a parent or a teenager preparing a meal, then it is not a case of parentification, even if that task supports the family as a whole, relieves some of the burden on the parents, or is not the child's preferred activity.

Two distinct types of parentification have been identified technically: instrumental parentification and emotional parentification. Instrumental parentification involves the child completing physical tasks for the family, such as cooking meals or cleaning the house. Emotional parentification occurs when a child or adolescent must take on developmentally inappropriate emotional support roles, such as a confidante or mediator for (or between) parents or family members.

== Background ==
Melitta Schmideberg noted in 1948 that emotional deprivation could lead parents to treat their children (unconsciously) as substitute parent figures. In 1967, Minuchin et al. introduced the term parentification. Boszormenyi-Nagy et al. defined it in 1973 as "a parental figure's expectation that a child fulfill the role of a parent within the family subsystem."

Spousification and parental child (Minuchin) offered alternative concepts exploring the same phenomenon, while the theme of intergenerational continuity in such violations of personal boundaries was further examined. Furthermore, Eric Berne highlighted the dangers of parents and children having a symmetrical, rather than asymmetrical relationship, as when an absent spouse is replaced by the eldest child in the family dynamic; and Virginia Satir wrote of "the role–function discrepancy...where the son gets into a head-of-the-family role, commonly that of the father".

Object relations theory suggest that a child's false self is called into being when it is forced prematurely to take excessive care of the parental object; and John Bowlby looked at what he called "compulsive caregiving" among the anxiously attached, as a result of a parent inverting the normal relationship and pressuring the child to be an attachment figure for them.

All such aspects of disturbed and inverted parenting patterns have been drawn under the umbrella of the wider phenomenon of parentification, with the result (critics suggest) that on occasion "ironically the concept of parentification has...been as over-burdened as the child it often describes".

== Gender and birth order effects ==
When a family has multiple children, it is usually the oldest child, or the oldest child of a particular gender, who is at highest risk for parentification.

Elder children, often firstborns, are chosen for the familial parental role. In part, this is likely because the older child is developmentally capable of providing more support to the family than the younger siblings.

Gender considerations mean that sometimes the eldest boy or eldest girl is selected, even if they are not the oldest child overall, for such reasons as the preference to match the sex of a missing parent. Girls, especially those living in a large family, are more likely than boys to be pushed into developmentally inappropriate amounts and types of caregiving. If there is a disabled child in the family to be cared for, "older siblings, especially girls, are at the greatest risk of parentification". The tendency to burden the oldest girl in the family is sometimes called eldest daughter syndrome.

Feminist and sociological perspectives suggest that patterns of parentification reflect broader cultural and structural expectations of gendered care, where eldest daughters take on unpaid emotional and domestic labor in families. These expectations can be understood within global systems that undervalue and naturalize women’s caregiving and reproductive roles, rendering such labor invisible within dominant economic and social discourses.

The parentification of eldest daughters often severely affects their mental health. The self-worth of these young women is frequently tied to achievement and caregiving. For many eldest daughters, they tend to base their self-worth on how successful they are at their familial role. This includes how helpful they've been with lifting burdens off their family, if they're making their family proud in school or work, and how good of an overall daughter they are.

An article published in Therapy Today, by Ragini Jha, dissects the role eldest daughter syndrome plays when considering mental health. Eldest daughters often feel bombarded with the responsibilities of others, biting off much more than they can chew because they long for perfection. This doesn’t just include physical responsibilities, but emotional ones too. Emotional responsibilities include constant mood monitoring, a psychological habit many eldest daughters adopt and struggle to break, that is referred to as "empathy's evil twin". Mood monitoring includes checking body language and anticipating the needs of others to get ahead of conflict, which eventually becomes emotionally exhausting.

A married, widowed, or single parent may treat their child as their spouse; this is known as spousification, and it occurs more often among single than married parents. Mother–son spousification is more common than father–daughter spousification. Mothers may put their sons in this role due to a desire for protection but fear of men. Their sons are a less threatening option.

Mother–daughter parentification is also more common than father–daughter parentification. Daughters are likelier than sons to be an emotional anchor. In a mother–daughter relationship, the mother might oblige her daughter to take on the caregiving role, in a betrayal of the child's normal expectation of love and care.

== Types ==
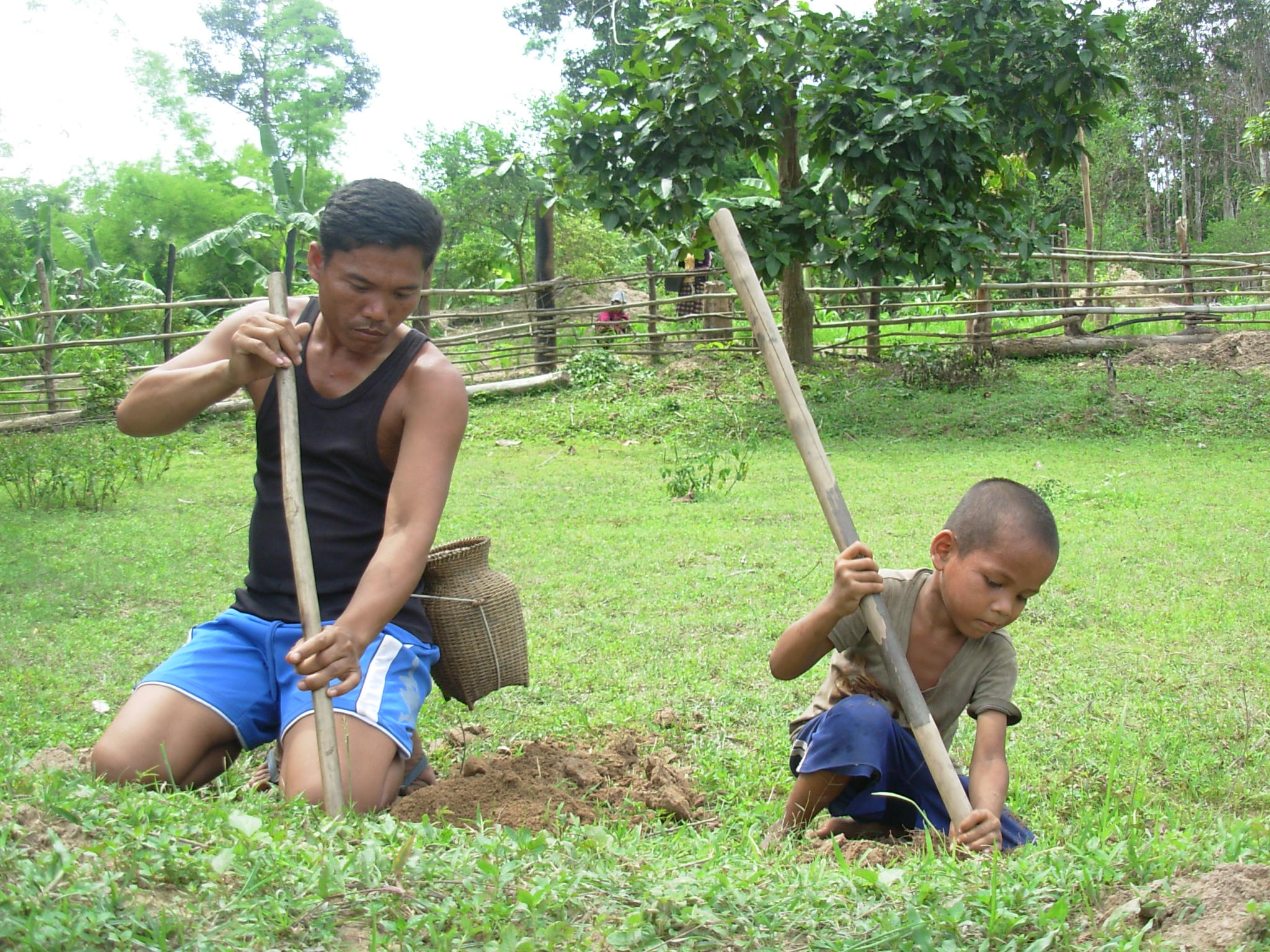
This father and his young son are digging together. Teaching a child useful life skills is not parentification.

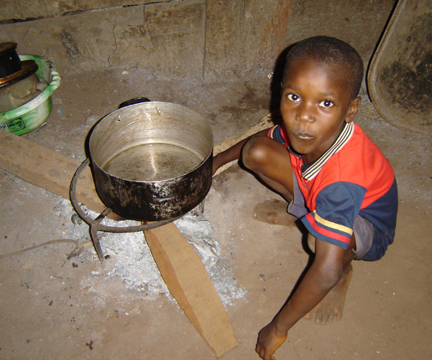
Young children are not developmentally ready to manage a cooking fire, so expecting them to cook by themselves is an example of parentification.

There are several types of parentification and related concepts:

- Instrumental parentification involves the child doing physical tasks for the family, such as cooking meals or cleaning the house. Teaching a child or adolescent necessary skills is not parentification, nor is requiring the child to contribute productively to the household's maintenance. What distinguishes instrumental parentification from good parenting is whether the amount and type of work matches the child's developmental needs. For example, good parents provide opportunities for children and adolescents to practice life skills such as cooking, cleaning, and caring for others, so they will have these necessary skills when they become adults, but if the amount of household work prevents the child from getting enough rest or from going to school, then it is overly burdensome. Similarly, most children are able to assist with meal preparation, but they may not have the attention, motor skills, or executive function needed to safely cook without close supervision.
- Emotional parentification occurs when a child is pushed into developmentally inappropriate emotional support roles. For example, some parents ask their children for advice about the parents' own romantic relationships, or expect their children to support and manage the parents' emotions, or push children into the role of mediators and peacemakers in the family. Emotional parentification is more harmful than instrumental parentification.
- Adaptive parentification occurs when a child is given significant instrumental responsibilities, but is also given emotional support and recognition for their contributions to the family. This is most likely to be adaptive during a temporary situation.
- Destructive parentification is harmful forms of parentification, especially without emotional support.
- Spousification is when a parent treats a child like their spouse. For example, a single mother may treat her son like an adult and expect him to take on the practical or emotional responsibilities that she would expect her husband to handle.
- Narcissistic parentification, named after narcissism, occurs when a child is forced to take on the parent's idealised projection, something which encourages a compulsive perfectionism in the child at the expense of their natural development. In a type of pseudo-identification, the child is induced by any and all means to take on the characteristics of the parental ego ideal – a pattern that has been detected in western culture since Homer's description of the character of Achilles.

== Effects ==
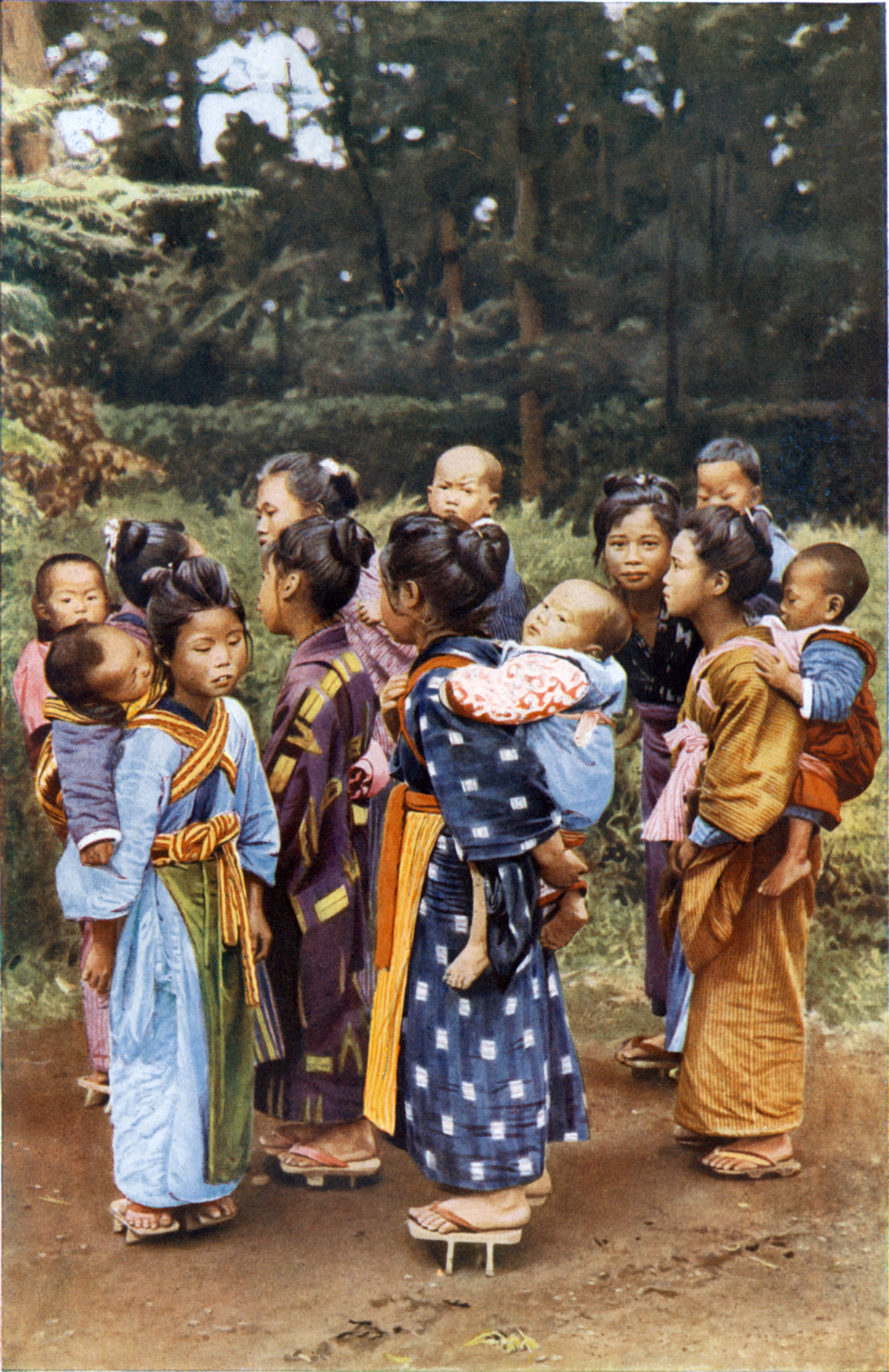
In the 1920s, some Japanese girls regularly watched younger siblings while playing with their friends. Whether this became maladaptive parentification depends on factors such as how much work they did and what kind of support (such as a nearby adult to help in case of trouble) they received.

Parentification is harmful when it is unfair, developmentally inappropriate, and significantly burdens the child.

As it may be adaptive or maladaptive, it is not always pathological, but its destructive form (termed destructive parentification) is linked to maladaptive parenting, child maladaptation, physical abuse, sexual abuse, behavioral problems, decreased emotionality, and poor social competence. Parentified children also have a higher risk of depression, suicidal ideation, anxiety, and low self-esteem.

Parentification has been linked to young women with eating disorders, particularly in the case of father–daughter relationships. Where there is more than one daughter, the oldest daughter is likelier to be groomed for sexual activity and parentified. One or more of her younger sisters may be targeted by the father for sexual activity in later years. Father–son emotional parentification may result in depression and externalizing in sons.

A significant byproduct of parentification is the loss of a developmentally appropriate childhood. The child may also drop out of school to assume the parental role. In destructive parentification, the child in question takes on excessive responsibility in the family, without their caretaking being supported adequately by others.

By adopting the role of parental caregiver, the child loses their natural place in the family unit. In extreme instances, there may be what has been called a kind of disembodiment, a narcissistic wound that threatens one's basic self-identity. In later life, parentified children often experience anxiety over abandonment and loss, and demonstrate difficulty handling rejection and disappointment within interpersonal relationships.

Boszormenyi-Nagy et al. are among the researchers who have argued that parentification is not always maladaptive. Researchers of this view say that children may benefit from being treated as capable individuals and taking on the role of supporting and caring for their family. Researchers have speculated that parentification may enhance empathy, altruism, and responsibility levels for a child. The child may pursue a career in the mental health field. The positive effects are likely if the parentification was temporary and moderate, which is an aspect of adaptive parentification.

Adaptive parentification can manifest if the parent is vital to their child's development and expresses to the child their awareness of and appreciation for the child assuming the parental role. Adaptive parentification may not be role reversal when it is instrumental rather than emotional caretaking, temporary and without heavy burden, and when the child is treated fairly by their parents and has their support. Instead of being an aspect of psychopathology, it is a coping mechanism for stress.

== Case studies ==
- Carl Jung in his late autobiography reports that his mother always spoke to him as an adult, confiding in him what she could not share with her husband. Laurens van der Post commented on the grown-up atmosphere surrounding the young Jung, and considered that "this activation of the pattern of the "old man" within himself...was all a consequence of the extent to which his father and mother failed each other".
- Patrick Casement reports on a patient named Mr. T whose mother would be distressed if he expressed his feelings. To limit this displeasure, Mr. T would then shield his mother from any of his emotions, mothering her himself.

== Literary examples ==
The Tale of Genji tells that for "Kaoru's mother...her son's visits were her chief pleasure. Sometimes he almost seemed more like a father than a son – a fact which he was aware of and thought rather sad".

Charles Dickens' "Angel in the house" characters, particularly Agnes Wickfield in David Copperfield, are parentified children. Agnes is forced to be the parent of her alcoholic father and seems to strive for perfection as a means of reaching the "ego ideal" of her deceased mother (who died upon child-birth). Because of this, Agnes marries late, has relationship and intimacy problems (she has a hard time expressing her love for David until he reveals his own love for her), and has some self-defeating attitudes; in one scene she blames her own father's misfortunes on herself. However, she proves to be resilient, resourceful, responsible and even potentially career-driven (she forms her own school). She also manages to marry the protagonist David and the two live happily together for 10 years with children by the end of the novel.

The theme of parentification has also been explored in the Twilight series, with particular but not exclusive reference to the character of Bella Swan.

== See also ==
- Atlas personality
- Infantilization
- Covert incest
- Effects of domestic violence on children
