= Mental illness in Middle-earth =

Theme in Tolkien's fantasy

The appearance of mental illness in Middle-earth has been discussed by scholars of literature and by psychiatrists. Middle-earth is the fantasy world created by J. R. R. Tolkien. His novels The Hobbit and The Lord of the Rings are both set in Middle-earth and are peopled with realistically-drawn characters who experience life much as people do in the real world. Characters as diverse as Denethor, Théoden, Beorn, Gollum, and Frodo have been seen as possibly exemplifying conditions including paranoia, bipolar depression, schizoid personality disorder, post-traumatic stress disorder, and dissociative amnesia.

Tolkien's depiction of Frodo's mental suffering may derive from his own wartime experience. Scholars state that his friend C. S. Lewis was interested in Jungian psychology and the collective unconscious; Tolkien used these concepts in several places. Middle-earth is known to fans both through Tolkien's writings and through other media, notably Peter Jackson's The Lord of the Rings film series. In a celebrated scene, Jackson's 2002 film The Lord of the Rings: The Two Towers depicts Gollum/Sméagol talking to himself, using the device of shot/reverse shot to switch between the two personalities.

Tolkien fans have discussed Gollum's diagnosis on over 1300 websites. A supervised study by medical students, in a paper that uses both Tolkien's and Jackson's depictions of the character, concluded that Gollum does not meet the criteria for schizophrenia or multiple personality disorder, but that he meets 7 of 9 criteria for schizoid personality disorder. Some psychiatrists have suggested that The Lord of the Rings offers useful and "very tangible" lessons for mental health by helping readers to envisage and empathise with the situations of other people.

== Context ==
=== Middle-earth ===
J. R. R. Tolkien (1892–1973) was an English Roman Catholic writer, poet, philologist, and academic, best known as the author of the high fantasy works The Hobbit and The Lord of the Rings, both set in his subcreated world of Middle-earth.

=== Scholarly and psychiatric insights ===
The scholar of English Steve Walker states that Tolkien has rooted every element of Middle-earth naturally, using descriptions of Earthlike weather, landforms, peoples, cultures, flora, and fauna. He comments that

The psychological authentication of Tolkien's fiction approaches Freudian levels of subtlety. That psychiatric insight can get almost clinical, as with the representation of Denethor's aberrant behavior in terms of paranoia, the motivation of Théoden's passivity as bipolar depression, and the causally rich implications of the parallels between Beorn's werebear transformations and symptoms of epileptic seizure.

Other Tolkien scholars and psychiatrists broadly agree with Walker, in addition suggesting Gollum's schizoid personality disorder and the resemblance of Frodo's increasingly disturbed mental state to post-traumatic stress disorder. The medievalist Alke Haarsma-Wisselink, who has experienced psychotic episodes, remarks that both Bilbo and Thorin in The Hobbit have symptoms of psychosis. The Tolkien scholar James T. Williamson describes how Éowyn responds to her "perceived rejection" by Aragorn with "a madness" seen as her eyes change "from gray to 'on fire'"; other scholars have named Éowyn as suffering from depression.

The psychiatrists Landon van Dell and colleagues write that The Lord of the Rings offers useful and "very tangible" lessons for mental health by helping readers to envisage and empathise with the situations of other people.

== Tolkien's interest in the subject ==
=== Wartime experience ===
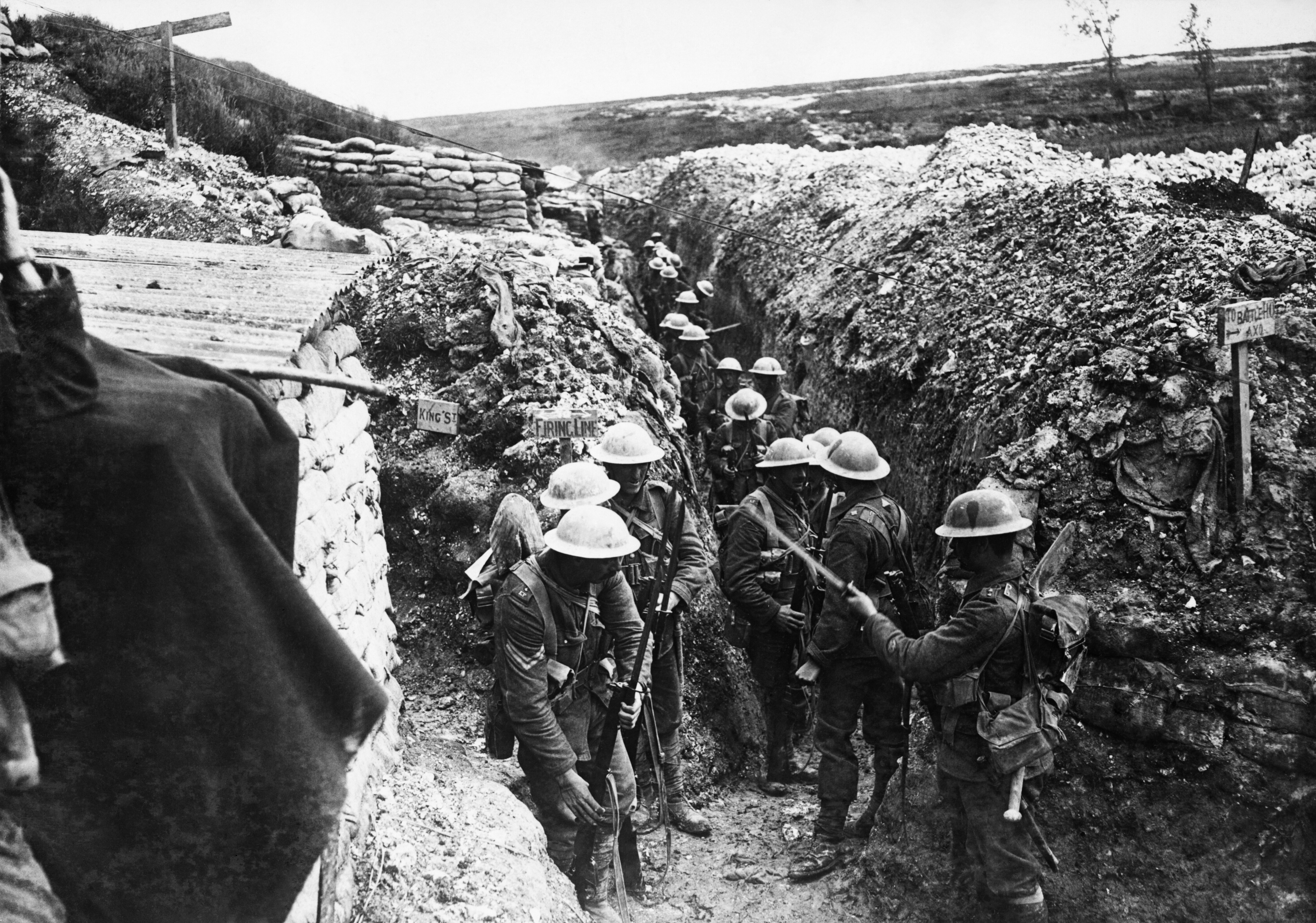
Tolkien experienced trench warfare with the Lancashire Fusiliers (pictured), on the Western Front in 1916.

Tolkien's depiction of Frodo's mental suffering may owe something to his own wartime experience. The Tolkien scholar Karyn Milos comments that "recurring pain and intrusive memory, often triggered by significant dates or other reminders of the traumatic event, is a central characteristic of post-traumatic stress." Janet Brennan Croft adds that "Frodo's experience of the war" resembles "modern war in its unrelieved stress". As in the static trenches of the First World War, in which Tolkien had fought, Frodo had to stay in cover on his quest to Mordor, constantly threatened by a watchful enemy he could not see.

=== Jungian psychology ===
The Swiss psychiatrist Carl Jung coined the term analytical psychology for his approach to the psyche. His theory included archetypes, the collective unconscious, individuation, the Self, and the shadow. Tolkien and his friend C. S. Lewis were members of The Inklings literary club. The Tolkien scholar Nancy Bunting states that Lewis was interested in Jungian psychology and "enchanted" by the idea of the collective unconscious, and that he probably shared these ideas with Tolkien. The scholar Verlyn Flieger states that Tolkien's incomplete novel The Lost Road was based on the collective unconscious. Flieger comments that in The Lost Road, Tolkien uses the "recognised psychological phenomenon" of sudden flashbacks "as a psychic gateway into locked-off areas of the soul". The clinical psychologist Nancy Bunting writes that Tolkien expressed a Jungian view in several places, such as in a letter to Christopher Tolkien which, in her words, "sounds the Jungian refrain of linking native soil, race, and language". Dorothy Matthews and others have identified numerous Jungian archetypes, such as the "Wise Old Man", in The Lord of the Rings.

=== Shakespeare's King Lear ===
The madness and despair of Denethor, Steward of Gondor, have been compared to that of Shakespeare's King Lear. Both men are first outraged when their children (Faramir and Cordelia, respectively) refuse to aid them, but then grieve upon their children's death – or apparent death, in the case of Faramir. Both Denethor and Lear have been described as despairing of God's mercy, something extremely dangerous in a leader who has to defend a realm. The Tolkien scholar Michael Drout writes that while Tolkien's professed dislike of Shakespeare is well-known, his use of King Lear for "issues of kingship, madness, and succession" was hardly surprising.

== Psychiatric conditions ==
=== Gollum's case ===
Gollum and Sméagol debate
J. R. R. Tolkien

Gollum was talking to himself. Sméagol was holding a debate with some other thought that used the same voice but made it squeak and hiss. A pale light and a green light alternated in his eyes as he spoke...
'But Sméagol said he would be very very good. Nice hobbit! He took cruel rope off Sméagol's leg. He speaks nicely to me.'
'Very very good, eh, my precious? Let's be good, good as fish, sweet one, but to ourselfs. Not hurt the nice hobbit, of course, no, no.'
'But the Precious holds the promise,' the voice of Sméagol objected.
'Then take it,' said the other, 'and let's hold it ourselfs! Then we shall be master, gollum! Make the other hobbit, the nasty suspicious hobbit, make him crawl, yes, gollum!' (Note: Tolkien 1955, book 4, ch. 2 "The Passage of the Marshes")

Peter Jackson
Peter Jackson's 2002 The Lord of the Rings: The Two Towers depicts Gollum/Sméagol talking to himself using the shot/reverse shot device in "perhaps the most celebrated scene in the entire film".

In Tolkien's book, the monster Gollum talks to himself in two different personalities, the good Sméagol and the evil Gollum. Peter Jackson's 2002 film The Lord of the Rings: The Two Towers, part of his major film series on Middle-earth, similarly depicts Gollum/Sméagol talking to himself in "perhaps the most celebrated scene in the entire film". The scene uses the device of shot/reverse shot to switch between the two personalities, who are represented as two different CGI characters. The scholar of film Kristin Thompson writes that Jackson and Fran Walsh, who directed the scene, suggest the mental conflict using a "subtle combination of framing, camera movement, editing, and character glances." Thompson comments that the scene's ability to make the viewer "apparently see two characters arguing with each other when only one is actually present creates an eerie, even astonishing moment that transcends the presentation in the book".

Tolkien fans have extensively discussed what mental illness this dual personality might represent. A 2004 paper in the British Medical Journal by supervised medical students at University College London (UCL) notes that the diagnosis for Gollum's mental illness is analysed on more than 1300 websites. Nomenclature has varied over the years, and fans have applied labels more or less loosely; a common description is dissociative identity disorder, also known as multiple personality disorder.

==== Schizophrenia ====
The UCL authors consider a diagnosis of schizophrenia for Gollum, based on Tolkien's and Jackson's depictions. The disorder is characterised by hearing voices, delusions, disorganised thinking and behaviour, and flat or inappropriate affect. They find that this diagnosis superficially looks reasonable; 25 of 30 students surveyed thought it likely. However, they note that Gollum does not have "false, unshakeable beliefs"; that the power of the One Ring is real in Middle-earth; and that other ring-bearers have the same symptoms. Accordingly, they find that the criteria for schizophrenia are not met.

==== Multiple personality disorder ====
The UCL authors then examine a diagnosis of multiple personality disorder in Gollum's case. They note that this looks possible; it is the second most common diagnosis in their student survey (3 of 30 thought it likely). However, they state that in multiple personality disorder, "one personality is suppressed by the other and the two personalities are always unaware of each other's existence". Because this is not true in Gollum's case, as the Gollum personality actually converses with Sméagol, and the two are aware of each other, the authors exclude this diagnosis. Bruce Leonard writes that Gollum "probably fits the criteria for PTSD" and "may fit the diagnoses for Dissociative Identity Disorder (DSM 330)".

==== Schizoid personality disorder ====
The UCL team conclude, despite the plausibility of the other diagnoses, that on the basis of the available evidence Gollum meets seven of the nine diagnostic criteria (in ICD-10 1992) for schizoid personality disorder, making this the most probable diagnosis. They state that Gollum displays several symptoms of the disorder: "pervasive maladaptive behaviour" since childhood "with a persistent disease course"; he has "odd interests" and indulges in "spiteful behaviour" which makes friendships difficult and causes "distress to others". The personality disorder is characterised by asociality, solitariness, secretiveness, emotional coldness, detachment, and apathy. Affected individuals may find it hard to form intimate attachments, but have a rich internal fantasy world.

=== Frodo's case ===
Frodo relives the trauma of the quest

In early March ... Frodo had been ill. On the thirteenth of that month Farmer Cotton found Frodo lying on his bed; he was clutching a white gem that hung on a chain about his neck and he seemed half in a dream. 'It is gone for ever', he said, 'and now all is dark and empty'. But the fit passed, and when Sam got back on the twenty-fifth, Frodo had recovered, and he said nothing about himself.

— The Lord of the Rings, book 6, ch. 9 "The Grey Havens" (Note: Tolkien 1955, book 6, ch. 9 "The Grey Havens")

==== Post-traumatic stress disorder ====
Milos and medical scholars like Bruce D. Leonard suggest that the ring-bearer Frodo, returning "irreparably wounded" from his quest, could be suffering from post-traumatic stress disorder. They note that Frodo repeatedly relives the most traumatic experiences "mentally, emotionally, and physically", especially on anniversaries of the quest's events.

==== Dissociative amnesia ====
Leonard quotes Tolkien's description of Frodo's behaviour after the quest: "By the end of the next day the pain and unease had passed, and Frodo was merry again, as merry as if he did not remember the blackness of the day before". (Note: Tolkien 1955, book 6, ch. 7 "Homeward Bound") Leonard comments that this sounds like dissociative amnesia, common alongside flashbacks of traumatic events. He writes that Tolkien's doubting phrase "as if" and the amnesia both suggest that Frodo was in a dissociative state on the day that he relived the Witch-king's attack on Weathertop, not wishing to remember it.

==== Obsessive-compulsive disorder ====
The scholar Andreas Minshew suggests that Frodo's behaviour resembled obsessive-compulsive disorder while carrying the Ring. Unlike other Ringbearers, Frodo recognizes the Ring's will as ego-dystonic, separate from and opposing his own will from the start of his quest. The thoughts and urges it generates are violating to his sense of self and cause him shame. This somewhat resembles harm-based OCD, where individuals experience intrusive thoughts, images, and urges to hurt others that contradict their core values. Minshew writes that Frodo's fear and hypervigilance are more warranted than in OCD, where individuals face no danger from acting on their intrusive thoughts.

==== Paranoia ====
Frodo sees the Eye watching him

But far more he was troubled by the Eye: so he called it to himself... The Eye: that horrible growing sense of a hostile will that strove with great power to pierce all shadows of cloud, and earth, and flesh, and to see you: to pin you under its deadly gaze, naked, immovable. So thin, so frail and thin, the veils were become that still warded it off. Frodo knew just where the present habitation and heart of that will now was: as certainly as a man can tell the direction of the sun with his eyes shut. He was facing it, and its potency beat upon his brow.

— The Lord of the Rings, book 4, ch. 2 "The Passage of the Marshes" (Note: Tolkien 1954, book 4, ch. 2 "The Passage of the Marshes")

Walker suggests that Denethor's increasingly "aberrant behavior" can be explained as despair and paranoia. As already mentioned, Croft writes that Frodo had to stay in cover on his quest to Mordor, constantly threatened by a watchful enemy he could not see. Edward Lense, in Mythlore, describes Frodo's continuing experience of seeing the Eye of Sauron wherever he goes as "read[ing] like the record of a paranoiac's delusions".

=== The orcs' case ===
==== Complex trauma ====
The therapist Karen L. Pollock proposes that orcish behaviour could indicate complex post-traumatic stress disorder and intergenerational trauma. Orcs are raised in abusive environments amidst warfare. Under extreme neglect, their brutality could be a response to societal trauma rather than being an inherent trait.

== Sources ==
- Carpenter, Humphrey (1978) [1977]. J. R. R. Tolkien: A Biography. Unwin Paperbacks. ISBN 978-0-04-928039-7.
- Leonard, Bruce D. (2023). "The Posttraumatic Stress Disorder of Frodo Baggins". Mythlore. 42 (1). article 2, pp. 5–28.
- Tolkien, J. R. R. (1954). The Two Towers. The Lord of the Rings. Boston: Houghton Mifflin. OCLC 1042159111.
- Tolkien, J. R. R. (1955). The Return of the King. The Lord of the Rings. Boston: Houghton Mifflin. OCLC 519647821.
- Walker, Steve (2009). The Power of Tolkien's Prose: Middle-Earth's Magical Style. New York: Palgrave Macmillan. ISBN 978-0-230-61992-0.
