= Jungian archetypes =

Psychological concept

Jungian archetypes are a concept from psychology that refers to a universal, inherited idea, pattern of thought, or image that is present in the collective unconscious of all human beings. As the psychic counterpart of instinct (i.e., archetypes are innate, symbolic, psychological expressions that manifest in response to patterned biological instincts), archetypes are thought to be the basis of many of the common themes and symbols that appear in stories, myths, and dreams across different cultures and societies.

Some examples of archetypes include those of the mother, the child, the trickster, and the flood, among others. The concept of the collective unconscious was first proposed by Carl Jung, a Swiss psychiatrist and analytical psychologist.

According to Jung, archetypes are innate patterns of thought and behavior that strive for realization within an individual's environment. This process of actualization influences the degree of individuation, or the development of the individual's unique identity. For instance, the presence of a maternal figure who closely matches the child's idealized concept of a mother can evoke innate expectations and activate the mother archetype in the child's mind. This archetype is incorporated into the child's personal unconscious as a "mother complex", which is a functional unit of the personal unconscious that is analogous to an archetype in the collective unconscious.

== Introduction ==
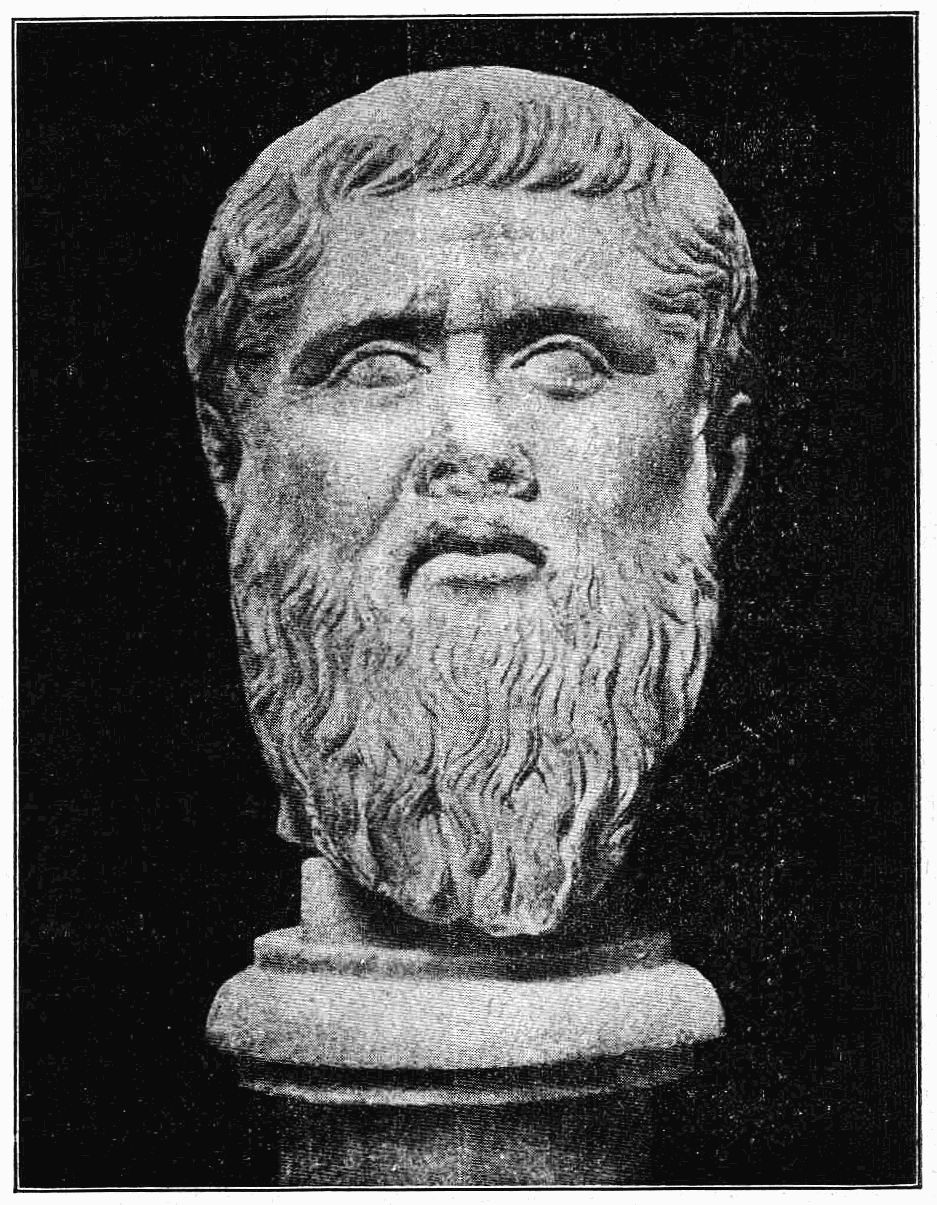
Jung's ideas on archetypes were based in part on Plato's Forms.

Carl Jung rejected the tabula rasa theory of human psychological development, which suggests that people are born as a "blank slate" and their experiences shape their thoughts, behaviors, and feelings. Instead, Jung believed that there are universal experiences that are inherent to the human experience, such as belongingness, love, death, and fear. These experiences, which he called the "collective unconscious," are expressed in what he called "archetypes." Jung believed that these archetypes are influenced by evolutionary pressures and manifest in the behaviors and experiences of individuals. He first introduced the concept of primordial images, which he later referred to as archetypes, to explain this idea. In his 2010 paper on reconsidering the innateness of Jungian archetypes, Goodwyn posits that archetypes are innate and based on universal emotional circuits, but are expressed dynamically depending on how environmental factors shape them.

According to Jungian psychology, archetypes are innate potentials that are expressed in human behavior and experiences. They are hidden forms that are activated when they enter consciousness and are shaped by individual and cultural experiences. The concept of archetypes is a key aspect of Jung's theory of the collective unconscious, which suggests that there are universal experiences that are inherent to the human experience. The existence of archetypes can be inferred from various cultural phenomena, such as stories, art, myths, religions, and dreams.

Jung's concept of archetypes was influenced by the theories of Immanuel Kant, Plato, and Arthur Schopenhauer. Jung's idea of archetypes differs from Plato's concept of Ideas in that they are dynamic and constantly seeking expression in an individual's personality and behavior. He believed that these archetypes are activated and given form in the encounter with empirical experiences.

For Jung, "the archetype is the introspectively recognizable form of a priori psychic orderedness". "These images must be thought of as lacking in solid content, hence as unconscious. They only acquire solidity, influence, and eventual consciousness in the encounter with empirical facts."

According to Jungian psychology, archetypes form a common foundation for the experiences of all humans. Each individual builds their own experiences on top of this foundation, influenced by their unique culture, personality, and life events. While there are a relatively small number of innate and amorphous archetypes, they can give rise to a vast array of images, symbols, and behaviors. While the resulting images and forms are consciously recognized, the underlying archetypes are unconscious and cannot be directly perceived.

Jung believed that the form of the archetype was similar to the axial system of a crystal, which determines the structure of the crystal without having a physical existence of its own. The archetype is empty and purely formal, and the specific way in which it is expressed depends on the circumstances in which it is activated. The representations of the archetype are not inherited, only the forms, and they correspond to the instincts. The existence of the instincts and the archetypes cannot be proven unless they manifest themselves concretely.

A study published in the journal Psychological Perspective in 2017 examined the ways in which Jungian representations are expressed in human experiences. The article summarized the findings of the study,

Archetypes are universal organizing themes or patterns that appear regardless of space, time, or person. Appearing in all existential realms and at all levels of systematic recursion, they are organized as themes in the unus mundus, which Jung... described as "the potential world outside of time," and are detectable through synchronicities.

== Early development ==
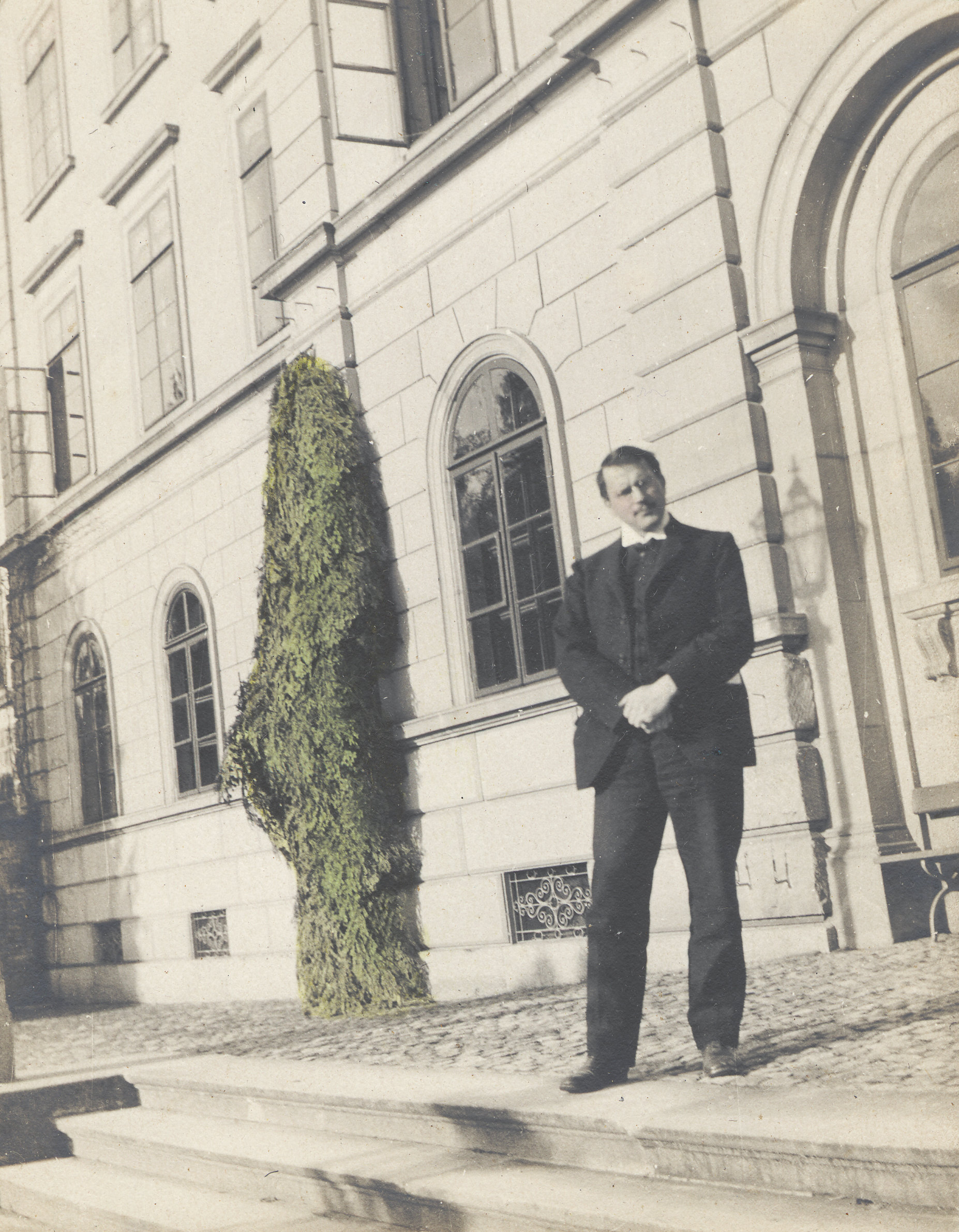
Carl Jung standing in front of Burghölzli clinic, Zurich 1909

Jung's intuition that there was more to psyche than individual experience may have originated in his childhood. He had dreams that seemed to come from a source outside himself, and one of his earliest memories was of a dream about an underground phallic god. Later in life, Jung's research in Burghölzli Hospital on psychotic patients and his own self-analysis supported his belief in the existence of universal psychic structures that underlie all human experience and behavior. He discovered that the dreams of his patients followed certain patterns and had elements of myths, legends, and fairy tales. Jung initially referred to these as "primordial images" – a term he borrowed from Jacob Burckhardt, later referring to them as "dominants of the collective unconscious" in 1917.

Jung first coined the term "archetypes" in his 1919 essay "Instinct and the Unconscious". The word is derived from Greek, with the first element, "arche," meaning "beginning, origin, cause, primal source principle," as well as "position of a leader, supreme rule, and government." The second element, "type," means "blow and what is produced by a blow, the imprint of a coin, form, image, prototype, model, order, and norm." In modern usage, the term signifies "pattern underlying form, primordial form."

== Later development ==
In later years, Jung revised and broadened the concept of archetype, conceiving them as psycho-physical patterns existing in the universe, given specific expression by human consciousness and culture. This was part of his attempt to link depth psychology to the larger scientific program of the twentieth century.

Jung proposed the archetype contained a dual nature, existing both in the psyche of an individual and the world at large. The non-psychic element, or "psychoid" archetype, is a synthesis of instinct and spirit and is not accessible to consciousness. Jung developed this concept with the collaboration of Austrian quantum physicist Wolfgang Pauli, who believed that the psychoid archetype was crucial to understanding the principles of the universe. Jung also saw the psychoid archetype as a continuum that includes what he previously referred to as "archtypal tendency", or the innate pattern of action.

The archetype is not just a psychic entity, but is more fundamentally a bridge to matter in general. Jung used the term unus mundus to describe the unitary reality that he believed underlies all manifest phenomena, observable or perceivable things that exist in the physical world. He conceived of archetypes as the mediators of the unus mundus, organizing not only ideas in the psyche, but also the fundamental principles of matter and energy in the physical world. The psychoid aspect of the archetype impressed Nobel laureate physicist Wolfgang Pauli, who embraced Jung's concept and believed that the archetype provided a link between physical events and the mind of the scientist studying them. This echoed the position adopted by German astronomer Johannes Kepler. Thus, the archetypes that order our perceptions and ideas are themselves the product of an objective order that transcends both the human mind and the external world.

== Examples ==
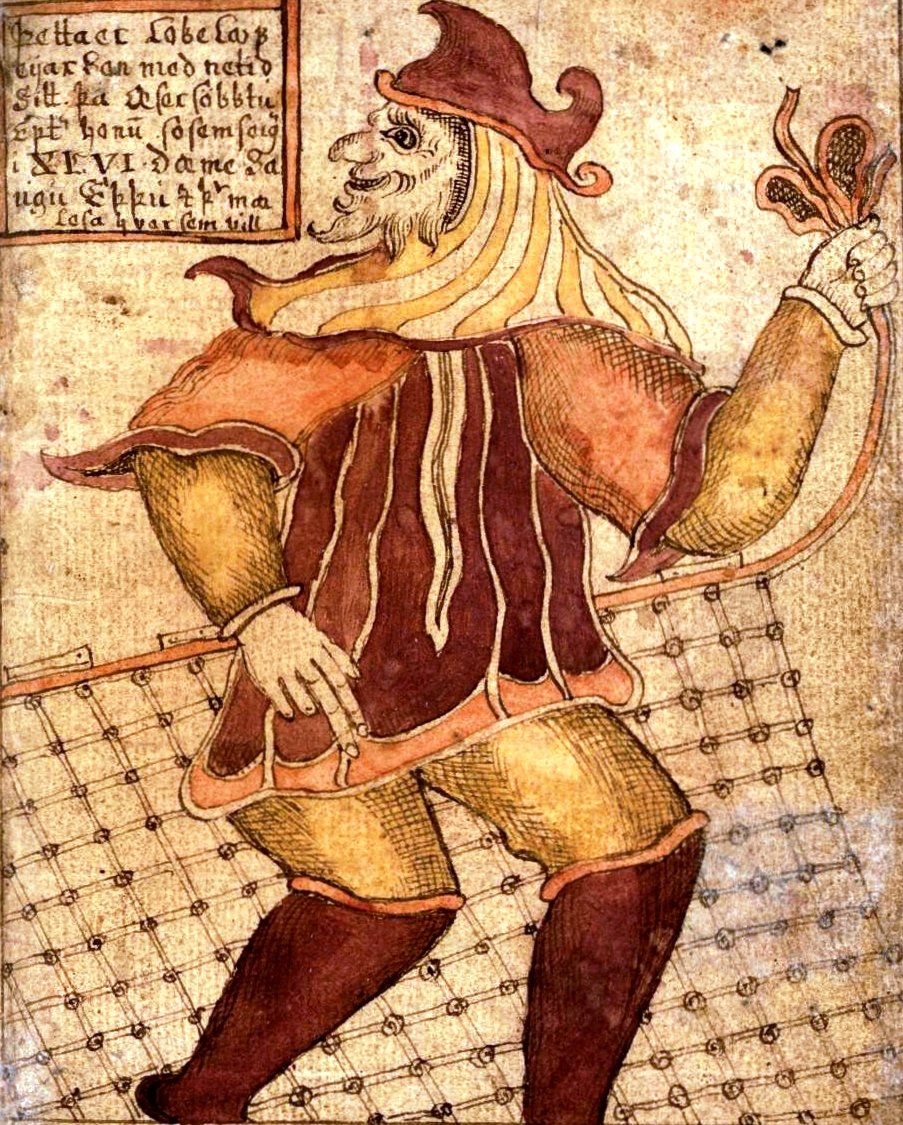
The Norse trickster god Loki as depicted on an 18th-century Icelandic manuscript.

Jung identified various archetypes in human psychology. These include events such as birth, death, and marriage; figures such as the mother, father, and child; and motifs such as the apocalypse and the deluge. Although the number of archetypes is limitless, there are a few particularly notable, recurring archetypal images, "the chief among them being" (according to Jung) "the shadow, the wise old man, the child, the mother ... and her counterpart, the maiden, and lastly the anima in man and the animus in woman". Alternatively he would speak of "the emergence of certain definite archetypes ... the shadow, the animal, the wise old man, the anima, the animus, the mother, the child". The persona, anima and animus, the shadow, and the self are four of the archetypes that fall under the separate systems of the personality.

The father represents the patriarchal qualities of the persona. Some of these qualities may include strength, anger, protector, provider, and wisdom. The father archetype can be seen in many forms such as, kings, chiefs, and the biological father.

The mother represents the nurturing, forgiving and protective aspect of the female figure. It is often associated with the qualities of love, compassion, patience and caring. The mother archetype can manifest itself in a variety of forms, such as a biological mother, a maternal figure in a person's life, or even a motherly aspect within one's own personality.

The self designates the whole range of psychic phenomena in people. It expresses the unity of the personality as a whole. According to Jung, this archetype manifests during middle age - the stage when all systems of the personality had developed and the individual is already concerned with his wholeness and self-fulfillment.

The shadow is a representation of the personal unconscious as a whole and usually embodies the compensating values to those held by the conscious personality. It is the hidden, suppressed side of the persona. The shadow's characteristics are in direct opposition to the persona. Thus, the shadow often represents one's dark side, those aspects of oneself that exist, but which one does not acknowledge or with which one does not identify. This is also described as the animalistic and sinister aspects of all people. Even though the shadow may seem to be a negative archetype, one that would degrade and destroy the ego, the opposite is true if the shadow is integrated properly. If the shadow is not integrated properly and suppressed there can be negative effects that can affect the individual and those around them.

The anima archetype appears in men and is his primordial image of woman. It represents the man's sexual expectation of women but also is a symbol of a man's feminine possibilities, his contrasexual tendencies. The animus archetype is the analogous image of the masculine qualities that exist within women. In addition, it can also refer to the conscious sense of masculine qualities among males.

Any attempt to give an exhaustive list of the archetypes would be a futile exercise since they tend to combine with each other and interchange qualities, making it difficult to decide where one archetype ends and another begins. For example, qualities of the shadow archetype may be prominent in an archetypal image of the anima or animus. One archetype may also appear in various distinct forms, thus raising the question of whether four or five distinct archetypes should be said to be present or merely four or five forms of a single archetype.

== Actualization and complexes ==
Archetypes seek actualization as the individual lives out their life cycle within the context of their environment. According to Jung, this process is called individuation, which he described as "an expression of that biological process – simple or complicated as the case may be – by which every living thing becomes what it was destined to become from the beginning". It is considered a creative process that activates the unconscious and primordial images through exposure to unexplored potentials of the mind. Archetypes guide the individuation process towards self-realization.

Jung also used the terms "evocation" and "constellation" to explain the process of actualization. Thus for example, the mother archetype is actualized in the mind of the child by the evoking of innate anticipations of the maternal archetype when the child is in the proximity of a maternal figure who corresponds closely enough to its archetypal template. This mother archetype is built into the personal unconscious of the child as a mother complex. Complexes are functional units of the personal unconscious, in the same way that archetypes are units for the collective unconscious.

== Stages of life ==
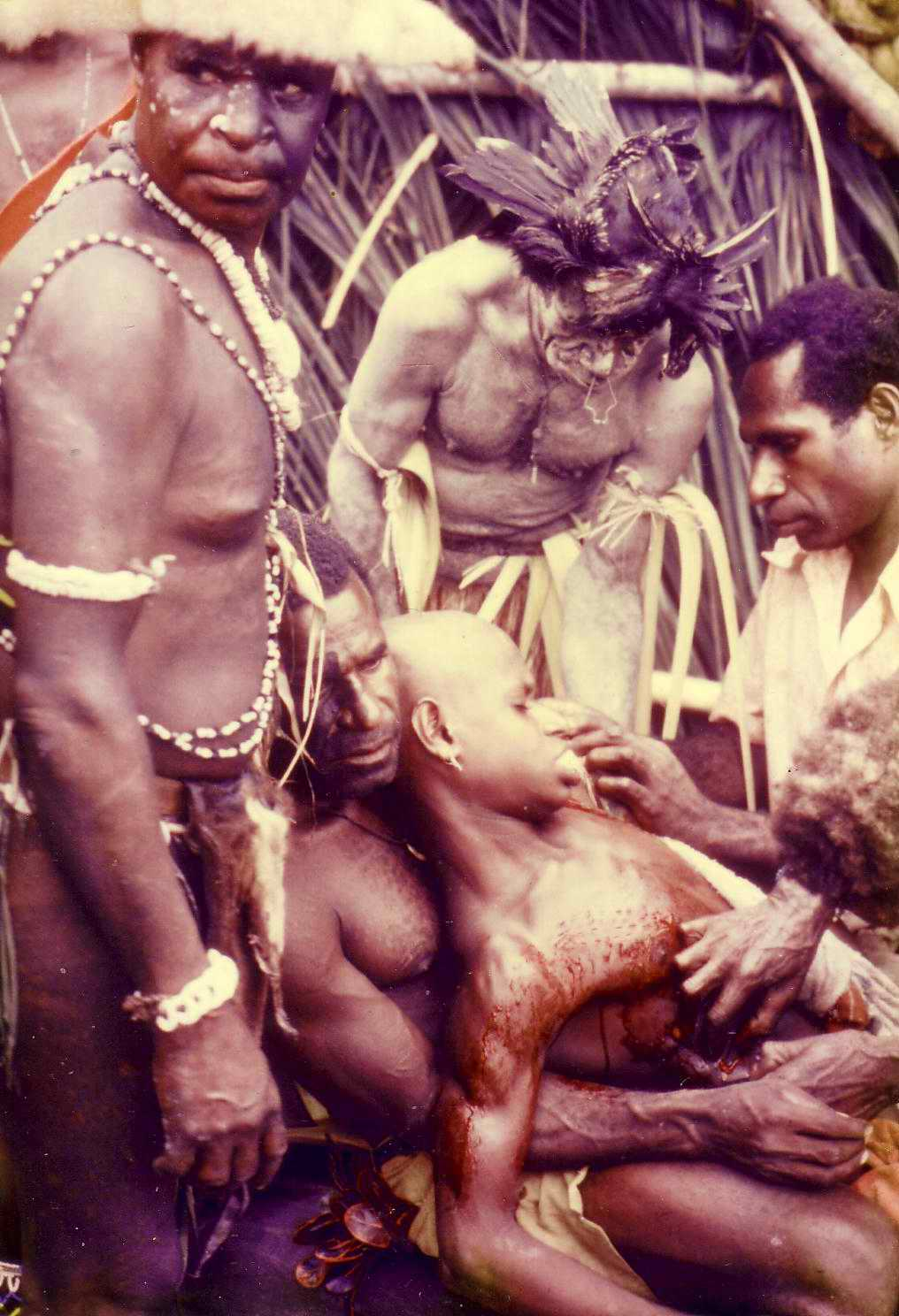
An initiation ceremony in Papua New Guinea takes place.

Archetypes are innate universal pre-conscious psychic dispositions, allowing humans to react in a human manner as they form the substrate from which the basic themes of human life emerge. The archetypes are components of the collective unconscious and serve to organize, direct and inform human thought and behavior. Archetypes hold control of the human life cycle.

As we mature, the archetypal plan unfolds through a programmed sequence which Jung called the stages of life. Each stage of life is mediated through a new set of archetypal imperatives which seek fulfillment in action. These may include being parented, initiation, courtship, marriage and preparation for death.

"The archetype is a tendency to form such representations of a motif – representations that can vary a great deal in detail without losing their basic pattern ... They are indeed an instinctive trend". Thus, "the archetype of initiation is strongly activated to provide a meaningful transition ... with a 'rite of passage' from one stage of life to the next": Such stages may include being parented, initiation, courtship, marriage and preparation for death.

Cann & Donderi (1986) empirical research suggests that archetypal imagery unfolds through conscious as well as unconscious processes. In this study, findings revealed that recall of archetypal dreams was correlated with Jungian personality type, which suggests that along with external environmental factors and biological predispositions, personality may also play a role in the way that archetypal themes emerge in different stages of life.

== General developments ==
In his book, Jung and the Post-Jungians, Andrew Samuels points out some important developments that relate to the concept of Jungian archetypes. Claude Lévi-Strauss was an advocate of structuralism in anthropology and, similar to Jung, was interested in better understanding the nature of collective phenomena. As he worked to understand the structure and meaning of myth, Levi-Strauss came to the conclusion that present phenomena are transformations of earlier structures or infrastructures, going so far as to state that "the structure of primitive thoughts is present in our minds".

Samuels further points out that, in Noam Chomsky's study of psycholinguistics, there is a pattern of language acquisition in children, or a universal grammar. Chomsky labeled this pattern as the language acquisition device. He also refers to a concept of 'universals' and makes a distinction between the 'formal' universals and the 'substantive' universals, similar to the difference between archetype as such (structure) and archetypal image.

Jean Piaget writes of 'schemata' which are innate and lay a foundation for perceptuo-motor activity and aid in the acquisition of knowledge. Samuels makes the claim that schemata are comparable to archetypes through their innateness, activity, and need for environmental correspondence.

Anthony Stevens argues that the concept of social instincts, which was proposed by Charles Darwin, the faculties of Henri Bergson, as well as the isomorphs of Wolfgang Kohler are all related to archetypes. All of these concepts relate to the studies of Strauss, who believed that "all forms of social life [are] a projection of universal laws responsible for regulating the unconscious activities of the psyche."

=== Ethology and attachment theory ===
In Biological Theory and the Concept of Archetypes, Michael Fordham considered that innate release mechanisms in animals may be applicable to humans, especially in infancy. The stimuli which produce instinctive behaviour are selected from a wide field by an innate perceptual system and the behaviour is 'released'. Fordham drew a parallel between some of Lorenz's ethological observations on the hierarchical behaviour of wolves and the functioning of archetypes in infancy.

Anthony Stevens suggests that ethology and analytical psychology are both disciplines trying to comprehend universal phenomena. Ethology shows us that each species is equipped with unique behavioural capacities that are adapted to its environment, and humans are no exception. Stevens claims that archetypes are the "neuropsychic centres responsible for co-ordinating the behavioural and psychic repertoire of our species."

The confusion about the essential quality of archetypes can partly be attributed to Jung's own evolving ideas about them in his writings and his interchangeable use of the term "archetype" and "primordial image." Jung was also intent on retaining the raw and vital quality of archetypes as spontaneous outpourings of the unconscious and not to give their specific individual and cultural expressions a dry, rigorous, intellectually formulated meaning. Programmed behaviour is taking place in the psychological relationship between mother and newborn. The baby's helplessness, its immense repertoire of sign stimuli and approach behaviour, triggers a maternal response. And the smell, sound and shape of mother, for instance, will trigger a feeding response.

=== Biology ===
Stevens suggests that DNA itself can be inspected for the location and transmission of archetypes. As they are coterminous with natural life they should be expected wherever life is found. He suggests that DNA is the replicable archetype of the species.

The Jungian analyst Murray Stein argues that all the various terms used to delineate the messengers – 'templates, genes, enzymes, hormones, catalysts, pheromones, social hormones' – are concepts similar to archetypes. He mentions archetypal figures which represent messengers such as Hermes, Prometheus or Christ. Continuing to base his arguments on a consideration of biological defence systems he says that it must operate in a whole range of specific circumstances, its agents must be able to go everywhere, the distribution of the agents must not upset the somatic status quo, and, in predisposed persons, the agents will attack the self.

=== Psychoanalysis ===
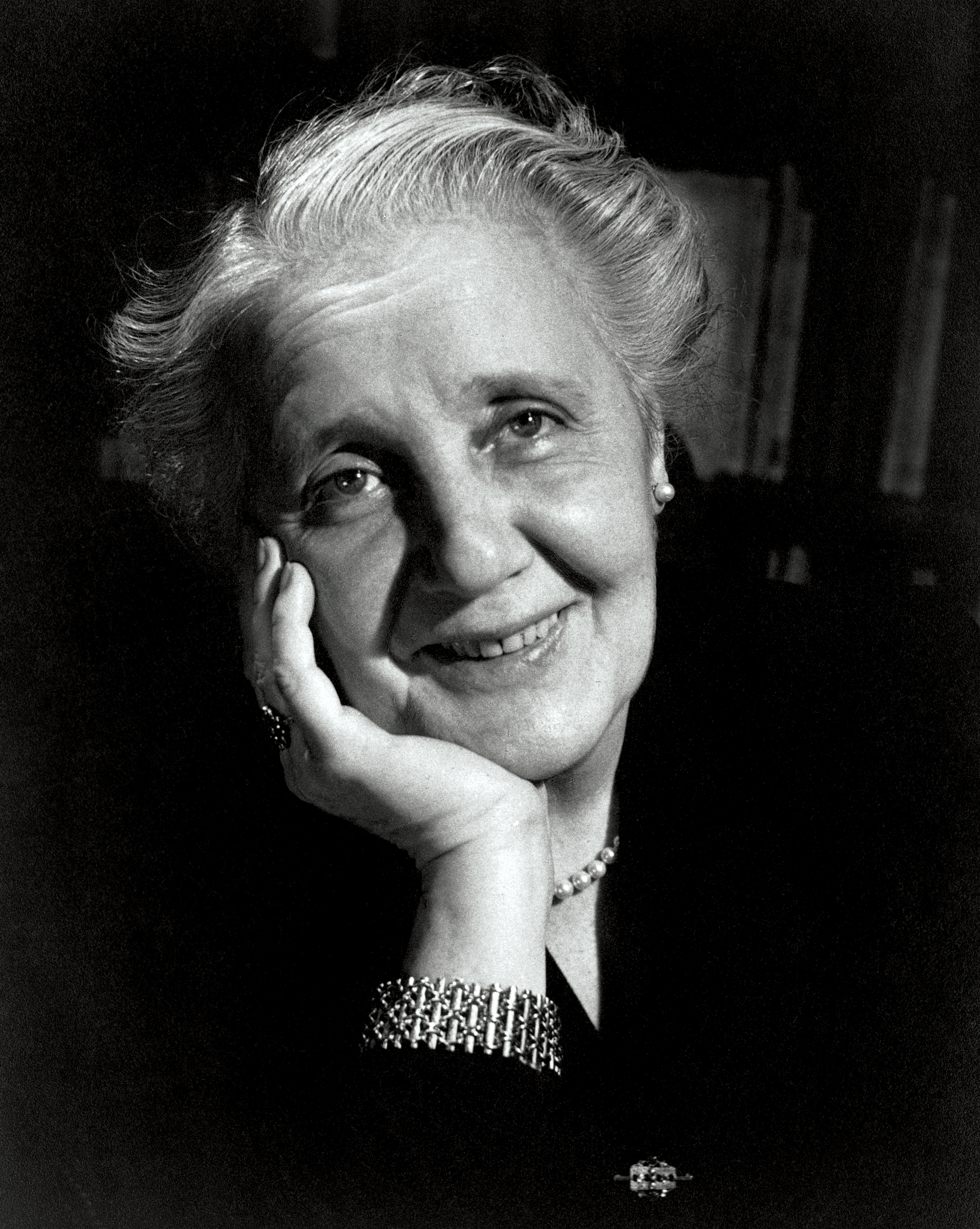
Melanie Klein (1952; age 72).

Melanie Klein: Melanie Klein's idea of unconscious phantasy is closely related to Jung's archetype, as both are composed of image and affect and are a priori patternings of psyche whose contents are built from experience.

Jacques Lacan: Lacan went beyond the proposition that the unconscious is a structure that lies beneath the conscious world; the unconscious itself is structured, like a language. This would suggest parallels with Jung. Further, Lacan's Symbolic and Imaginary orders may be aligned with Jung's archetypal theory and personal unconscious respectively. The Symbolic order patterns the contents of the Imaginary in the same way that archetypal structures predispose humans towards certain sorts of experience. If we take the example of parents, archetypal structures and the Symbolic order predispose our recognition of, and relation to them. Lacan's concept of the Real approaches Jung's elaboration of the psychoid unconscious, which may be seen as true but cannot be directly known. Lacan posited that the unconscious is organised in an intricate network governed by association, above all 'metaphoric associations'. The existence of the network is shown by analysis of the unconscious products: dreams, symptoms, and so on.

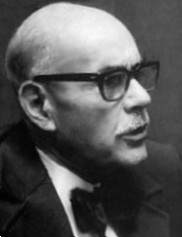
Wilfred Bion.

Wilfred Bion: According to Bion, thoughts precede a thinking capacity. Thoughts in a small infant are indistinguishable from sensory data or unorganised emotion. Bion uses the term proto-thoughts for these early phenomena. Because of their connection to sensory data, proto-thoughts are concrete and self-contained (thoughts-in-themselves), not yet capable of symbolic representations or object relations. The thoughts then function as preconceptions – predisposing psychosomatic entities similar to archetypes. Support for this connection comes from the Kleinian analyst Money-Kyrle's observation that Bion's notion of preconceptions is the direct descendant of Plato's Ideas.

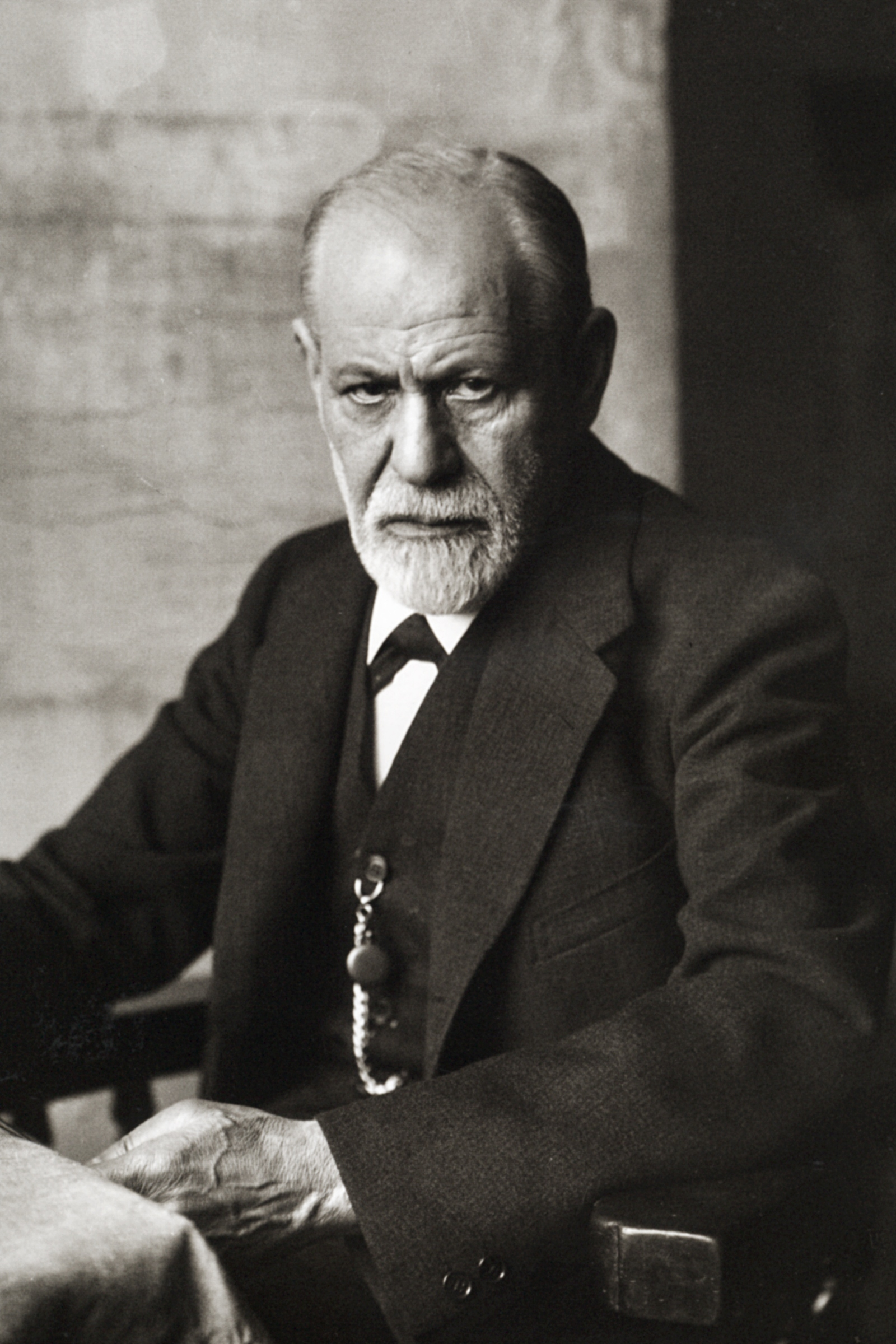
Sigmund Freud (1926; age 70).

Sigmund Freud: In the introductory Lectures on Psychoanalysis (1916–1917) Freud wrote: "There can be no doubt that the source [of the fantasies] lie in the instincts; but it still has to be explained why the same fantasies with the same content are created on every occasion. I am prepared with an answer that I know will seem daring to you. I believe that...primal fantasies, and no doubt a few others as well, are a phylogenetic endowment". His suggestion that primal fantasies are a residue of specific memories of prehistoric experiences have been construed as being aligned with the idea of archetypes. Laplanche and Pontalis point out that all the so-called primal fantasies relate to the origins and that "like collective myths they claim to provide a representation of and a 'solution' to whatever constitutes an enigma for the child".

Robert Langs: More recently, adaptive psychotherapist and psychoanalyst Robert Langs has used archetypal theory as a way of understanding the functioning of what he calls the "deep unconscious system". Langs' use of archetypes particularly pertains to issues associated with death anxiety, which Langs takes to be the root of psychic conflict. Like Jung, Langs thinks of archetypes as species-wide, deep unconscious factors.

=== Neurology ===
Rossi (1977) suggests that the function and characteristics between left and right cerebral hemispheres may enable us to locate the archetypes in the right cerebral hemisphere. He cites research indicating that left hemispherical functioning is primarily verbal and associational, and that of the right primarily visuospatial and apperceptive. Thus the left hemisphere is equipped as a critical, analytical, information processor while the right hemisphere operates in a 'gestalt' mode. This means that the right hemisphere is better at getting a picture of a whole from a fragment, is better at working with confusing material, is more irrational than the left, and is more closely connected to bodily processes. Once expressed in the form of words, concepts and language of the ego's left hemispheric realm, however, they become only representations that 'take their colour' from the individual consciousness. Inner figures such as shadow, anima and animus would be archetypal processes having source in the right hemisphere.

Henry (1977) alluded to Maclean's model of the tripartite brain suggesting that the reptilian brain is an older part of the brain and may contain not only drives but archetypal structures as well. The suggestion is that there was a time when emotional behaviour and cognition were less developed and the older brain predominated. There is a parallel with Jung's idea of the archetypes 'crystallising out' over time.

=== Literary criticism ===
Archetypal literary criticism argues that archetypes determine the form and function of literary works, and therefore, that a text's meaning is shaped by cultural and psychological myths. Archetypes are the unknowable basic forms personified or concretized in recurring images, symbols, or patterns which may include motifs such as the quest or the heavenly ascent, recognizable character types such as the trickster or the hero, symbols such as the apple or snake, or images such as crucifixion (as in King Kong, or Bride of Frankenstein) are all already laden with meaning when employed in a particular work.

=== Psychology ===
Archetypal psychology was developed by James Hillman in the second half of the 20th century. Hillman trained at the Jung Institute and was its Director after graduation. Archetypal psychology is in the Jungian tradition and most directly related to analytical psychology and psychodynamic theory, yet departs radically, even from Jung's original concept of what an archetype is. Archetypal psychology relativizes and deliteralizes the ego and focuses on the psyche (or soul) itself and the archai, the deepest patterns of psychic functioning, the "fundamental fantasies that animate all of life". Archetypal psychology is a polytheistic psychology, in that it attempts to recognize the myriad fantasies and myths, gods, goddesses, demigods, mortals and animals – that shape and are shaped by humans' psychological lives. According to Hillman, the ego is just one psychological fantasy that exists within a multitude of other fantasies.

=== Clinical Applications ===
Many archetypes have been used in treatment of psychological illnesses. Jung's first research was done with people with schizophrenia.

Jungian archetypes remain an influential concept and tool in modern clinical psychology. Goodwyn (2022) suggests that archetypes are dynamic entities that function epigenetically—there is a biological predisposition for archetypes to present in a certain way, but this may change based on the body and mind’s response to environmental and personal experiences. This conceptual framework proposes that universal archetypal themes are in fact not one-size-fits all, and may change throughout a person’s lifetime based on experiences. This perspective may allow a more flexible approach for therapists who utilize Jungian tools to assist clients in making sense of symbolism as it relates to their personal struggles.

=== Pedagogy ===
Archetypal pedagogy was developed by Clifford Mayes. Mayes' work also aims at promoting what he calls archetypal reflectivity in teachers; this is a means of encouraging teachers to examine and work with psychodynamic issues, images, and assumptions as those factors affect their pedagogical practices. More recently the Pearson-Marr Archetype Indicator (PMAI), based on Jung's theories of both archetypes and personality types, has been used for pedagogical applications (not unlike the Myers–Briggs Type Indicator).

== Applications of archetype-based thinking ==
=== In historical works ===
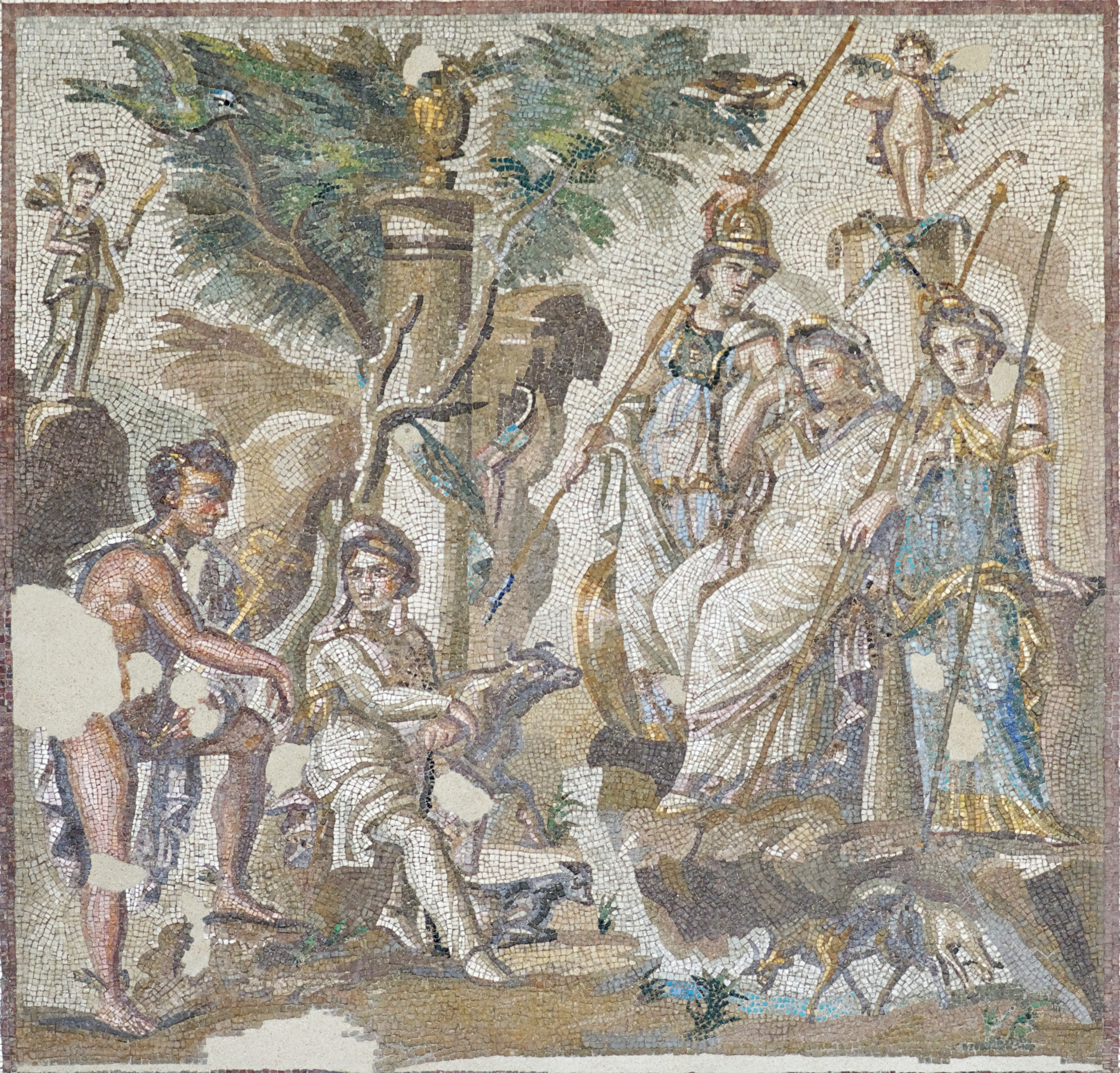
This Greek mosaic from Antioch, dating to the 2nd century AD, depicts the Judgement of Paris that caused the overall plot and events of the Iliad.

Archetypes have been cited by multiple scholars as key figures within both ancient Greek and ancient Roman culture. Examples from ancient history include the epic works Iliad and Odyssey. Specifically, scholar Robert Eisner has argued that the anima concept within Jungian thought exists in prototype form within the goddess characters in said stories. He has particularly cited Athena, for instance, as a major influence.

In the context of the medieval period, British writer Geoffrey Chaucer's work The Canterbury Tales has been cited as an instance of the prominent use of Jungian archetypes. The Wife of Bath's Tale in particular within the larger collection of stories features an exploration of the bad mother and good mother concepts. The given tale's plot additionally contains broader Jungian themes around the practice of magic, the use of riddles, and the nature of radical transformation.

In British intellectual and poet John Milton's epic work Paradise Lost, the character of Lucifer features some of the attributes of an archetypal hero, including courage and force of will, yet comes to embody the shadow concept in his corruption of Adam and Eve. Like the two first humans, Lucifer is portrayed as a created being meant to serve the purposes of heaven. However, his rebellion and assertions of pride set him up philosophically as a dark mirror of Adam and Eve's initial moral obedience. As well, the first two people function as each other's anima and animus, their romantic love serving to make each other psychologically complete.

=== In modern popular culture ===
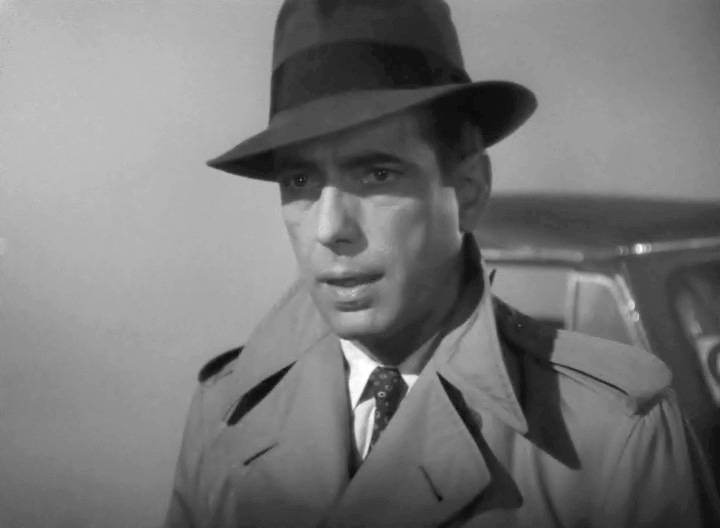
Casablanca co-protagonist Rick Blaine has been seen through Jungian analysis as a classic hero, the character being in one of the most memorable love triangles in film.

Archetypes abound in contemporary artistic expression such as films, literature, music, and video games as they have in creative works of the past. These projections of the collective unconscious serve to embody central societal and developmental struggles in media that entertain as well as instruct. Works made both during and after Jung's lifetime have frequently been subject to academic analysis in terms of their psychological aspects.

The very act of watching movies has important psychological meaning not just on an individual level, but also in terms of sharing mass social attitudes through common experience. Films function as a contemporary form of myth-making. They reflect individuals' responses to themselves as well as the broader mysteries and wonders of human existence. Jung himself felt fascinated by the dynamics of the medium. Film criticism has long applied Jungian thought to different types of analysis, with archetypes being seen as an important aspects of storytelling on the silver screen.

A study conducted by scholars Michael A. Faber and John D. Mayer in 2009 found that certain archetypes in richly detailed media sources can be reliably identified by individuals. They stated as well that people's life experiences and personality appeared to give them a kind of psychological resonance with particular creations. Jungian archetypes have additionally been cited as inflecting notions of what appears "cool", particularly in terms of youth culture. Actors such as James Dean and Steve McQueen in particular have been identified as rebellious outcasts embodying a particular sort of Jungian archetype in terms of masculinity.

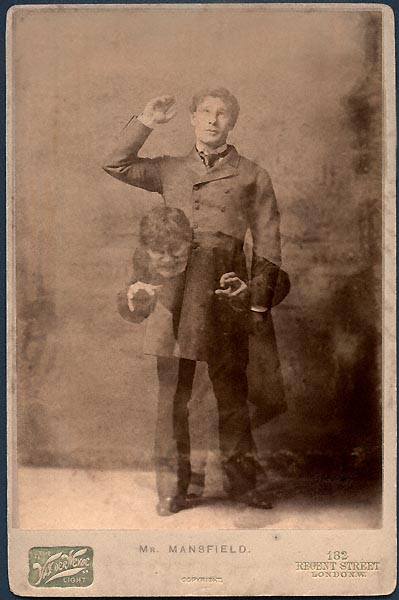
The malevolent Mr. Hyde from Dr. Jekyll and Mr. Hyde has been seen through Jungian analysis as a shadow figure.

Contemporary cinema is a rich source of archetypal images, most commonly evidenced for instance in the hero archetype: the one who saves the day and is young and inexperienced, like Luke Skywalker in Star Wars, or older and cynical, like Rick Blaine in Casablanca.

Atticus Finch of To Kill a Mockingbird, named the greatest movie hero of all time by the American Film Institute, fulfills three roles in terms of archetypes: the father, the hero, and the idealist. In terms of the former, he has been described "the purest archetypal father in the movies" in terms of his close relationship to his children, providing them with instincts such as hope.

A classic example of Jungian archetypes can be found in the story of Dr. Jekyll and Mr. Hyde. The shadow, ego, and persona are exemplified through Jekyll's internal struggle with the other facet of his personality, Mr. Hyde. In the original Star Wars trilogy, the characters Luke Skywalker and Darth Vader represent the archetypes of hero and the shadow, respectively.

In marketing, an archetype is a genre to a brand, based upon symbolism. The idea behind using brand archetypes in marketing is to anchor the brand against an icon, already embedded within the conscience and subconscious of humanity. In the minds of both the brand owner and the public, aligning with a brand archetype makes the brand easier to identify. Twelve archetypes have been proposed for use with branding: Sage, Innocent, Explorer, Ruler, Creator, Caregiver, Magician, Hero, Outlaw, Lover, Jester, and Regular Person.

== Criticism ==
Archetypes which universalize tend to abstract myths from the history of their actual creation, and their cultural context. Some modern critics state that archetypes reduce cultural expressions to generic decontextualized concepts, stripped bare of their unique cultural context, reducing a complex reality into something "simple and easy to grasp". Other critics respond that archetypes do nothing more than to solidify the cultural prejudices of the myth interpreter – namely modern Westerners. Modern scholarship has characterized archetypes as a Eurocentric and colonialist device to level the specifics of individual cultures and their stories in the service of grand abstraction. This is demonstrated in the conceptualization of the "Other", which can only be represented by limited ego fiction despite its "fundamental unfathomability".

Feminist critiques argue it is reductionistic and provides a stereotyped view of femininity and masculinity.

Carl Jung has also been accused of metaphysical essentialism. His psychology and particularly his thoughts on spirit lack a scientific basis, making them mystical and based on assumption rather than empirical investigation.

Others have accused him of a romanticized and prejudicial promotion of 'primitivism' through the medium of archetypal theory. Archetypal theory has been posited as being scientifically unfalsifiable and even questioned as to being a suitable domain of psychological and scientific inquiry. Jung mentions the demarcation between experimental and descriptive psychological study, seeing archetypal psychology as rooted by necessity in the latter camp, grounded as it was (to a degree) in clinical case-work.

Because Jung's viewpoint was essentially subjectivist, he displayed a somewhat Neo-Kantian perspective of a skepticism for knowing things in themselves and a preference of inner experience over empirical data. This skepticism opened Jung up to the charge of countering materialism with another kind of reductionism, one that reduces everything to subjective psychological explanation and woolly quasi-mystical assertions.

Post-Jungian criticism seeks to contextualize, expand and modify Jung's original discourse on archetypes. Michael Fordham is critical of tendencies to relate imagery produced by patients to historical parallels only (e.g. from alchemy, mythology or folklore). A patient who produces archetypal material with striking alchemical parallels runs the risk of becoming more divorced than before from his setting in contemporary life.

== See also ==
- Archetype
  - Archetypal psychology
    - Polytheistic myth as psychology
- Archive for Research in Archetypal Symbolism
- Egregore
- Evolutionary psychology
- Joseph Campbell
  - Hero's journey
- Mythology
- Mysticism
  - Comparative mythology
- Metafiction
  - Narrativium
- Self-actualization
- Self-realization
