= Child archetype =

Jungian archetype

The child archetype is a Jungian archetype, first suggested by psychologist Carl Jung. In more recent years, author Caroline Myss has suggested that the child, out of the four survival archetypes (child, victim, prostitute, and saboteur), is present in all humans. According to Myss, its presence ranges from "childish to childlike longing for the innocent, regardless of age" and comprises sub-archetypes: "wounded child", "abandoned or orphan child", "dependent child", "magical/innocent child", "nature child", "divine child", and "eternal child".

== Jungians ==
Jung placed the "child" (including the child hero) in a list of archetypes that represent milestones in individuation. Jungians exploring the hero myth have noted that "it represents our efforts to deal with the problem of growing up, aided by the illusion of an eternal fiction". Thus for Jung, "the child is potential future", and the child archetype is a symbol of the developing personality.

Others have warned, however, of the dangers posed to the parents drawn in by the "divine child" archetype – the belief of extraordinary potential in a child. The child, idealized by parents, eventually nurtures a feeling of superiority.

Even where affecting less acutely, the child archetype may inhibit psychological maturation and result in an adult who is, in essence, "Mama's darling". A man will end up with a strong attachment to a mother figure, either real or symbolic, and will lack the ability to form commitment or be generative. The female version of this, specified as the "puella", will have a corresponding attachment to her father figure.

== Retrospective and prospective ==
Jung was concerned with the possibility of one's over-identification with their own persona, which would turn an individual into a stereotype born of social expectations and ambition, "unchildlike and artificial". The child archetype becomes of use in this case, strengthening the individual's link to their past by helping them recall childhood experiences and emotions.

In its prospective role, the child archetype is a representation of future potentialities and psychological maturation.

== In literature and media ==
The child archetype is portrayed in media in various ways. It can take the form of a child who displays adult-like qualities — giving, for example, wise advice to their friends — or vice versa (like Raymond in the film Rain Man). More generally, "the child star can be conceptualized as a modern manifestation of the ancient archetype of the wonder-child".

=== Examples ===
- Calvin from Calvin and Hobbes
- Linus van Pelt from Peanuts
- Tommy Pickles from Rugrats
- Butters Stotch from South Park
- Andrew "Ender" Wiggin from Ender's Game
- Stewie Griffin from Family Guy
- Maggie Simpson from The Simpsons.
- Jake Chambers from The Dark Tower
- Krishna from Srimad Bhagavatham
- Corwin from Roger Zelazny's The Chronicles of Amber (Corwin actually evolves through several child archetypes, from "wounded child" to "divine child")
- Damien from The Omen
- Lyra Belacqua from His Dark Materials (Lyra also evolves throughout the story, as she undergoes a maturation process and eventually loses her innocence)
- Huey Freeman from The Boondocks
- Jesus Christ from The Bible
- Peter Pan from Peter Pan

== See also ==
- Archive for Research in Archetypal Symbolism
- Puer aeternus
