= Crone =

Stock character; a malicious old woman, often occult or witch-like

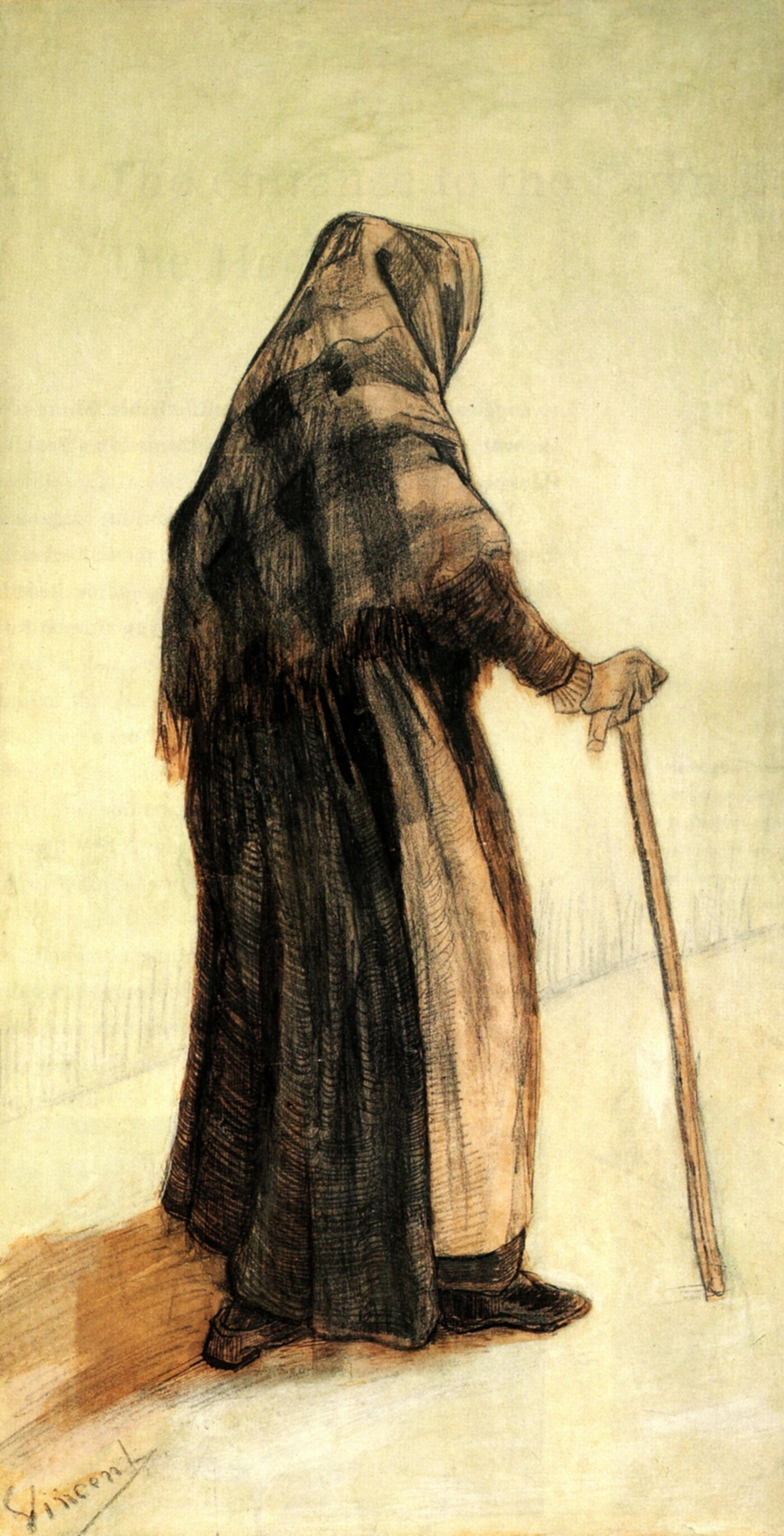
Archetypical appearance of a crone. Old Woman Seen from Behind, by Vincent van Gogh.

In folklore, a crone is an old woman who may be characterized as disagreeable, malicious, or sinister in manner, often with magical or supernatural associations that can make her either helpful or obsolete. As a concept, 'The Crone' is also often associated with the Jungian archetype of the Wise Woman or, if accompanied by 'The Maiden' and 'The Mother', as a member of the Triple Goddess deity archetype. As a character type, the crone shares characteristics with the hag.

== Description ==
The word became further specialized as the third aspect of the Triple Goddess popularized by Robert Graves and subsequently in some forms of neopaganism. In Wicca, the crone symbolizes the Dark Goddess, the dark side of the Moon, the end of a cycle; together with the Mother (Light Goddess) and the Maiden (Day Goddess), she represents part of the circle of life. The archetype of the Handsome Warlock, good or bad, may change a Crone or Hag to normal looks, if so desired.

== In some feminist circles ==
In feminist spiritual circles, a "Croning" is a rite of passage into an era of wisdom, freedom, and personal power.

According to scholar Clarissa Pinkola Estés, the Crone is "the one who sees far, who looks into the spaces between the worlds and can see what is coming, what has been, and what is now and what underlies and stands behind many things. [...] The Crone represents the ability to see, more than just with one’s eyes alone, but to see with the heart’s eyes, with the soul’s eyes, through the eyes of the creative force and the animating force of the psyche."

== In folklore ==
The crone, along with many other female monsters is present in many cultures to warn of stereotypically feminine archetypes. The crone often highlights the importance of beauty and youth among women in their culture, and how older and elderly women can turn bitter and evil in their old age. In media, the crone often acts out of jealousy, luring young pretty women into bad situations, such as seen in the tale Snow White.

== Etymology ==
As a noun, crone entered the English language around the year 1390, deriving from the Anglo-French word carogne (an insult), itself deriving from the Old North French charogne, caroigne, meaning a disagreeable woman (literally meaning "carrion"). Prior to the entrance of the word into English, the surname Hopcrone is recorded (around 1323–1324).

In more modern usage, crone is also defined as a "woman who is venerated for experience, judgment, and wisdom."

Clarissa Pinkola Estes suggests that the word crone may derive from the word crown (or, la corona). While a crown is known as a circlet that goes around the head and establishes one's authority as a leader, "before this understanding, the crown, la corona, was understood to mean the halo of light around a person’s body. La corona was considered to shine more brightly when a person was clear, filled with love and justice." Thus, Estes suggests, the Crone is one who reflects this enhanced degree of clarity and in/sight.

== Examples ==
In Norse myth, Thor wrestles the crone Elli who personifies old age.

In the local folklore of Somerset in South West England, the Woman of the Mist is said to appear sometimes as a crone gathering sticks; sightings of her were reported as late as the 1950s. In the Scottish Highlands tale "The Poor Brother and the Rich", a crone refuses to stay buried, until her son-in-law provides a generous wake, after which he becomes as wealthy as his more fortunate brother.

In Cuban traditional folklore old women often appear as helpful characters, as in the tale of the sick man who cannot get well until he meets an old woman who advises him to wear the tunic of a man who is truly happy. According to writer Alma Flor Ada, "They tend to be the ones who keep the family together, who pass on the traditions, who know the remedies that would cure the different illnesses".

== See also ==
- Black Annis
- Cailleach
- Fairy godmother
- Hag
- La Befana
- Queen (Snow White)
- Wicca
- Wicked fairy godmother
- The Witch (fairy tale)
- Witchcraft
