= Archetypal pedagogy =

Theory of Education by Clifford Mayes

Archetypal pedagogy /ˈpɛdəɡɒdʒi/ is a theory of education developed by Clifford Mayes that aims at enhancing psycho-spiritual growth in both the teacher and student. The idea of archetypal pedagogy stems from the Jungian tradition and is directly related to analytical psychology.

== History ==
Clifford Mayes, professor in the Brigham Young University McKay School of Education, has developed what he has termed archetypal pedagogy. Mayes' work aims at promoting what he calls archetypal reflectivity in teachers; this is a means of encouraging teachers to examine and work with psychodynamic issues, images, and assumptions as those factors affect their pedagogical practices. Archetypal reflectivity, which draws not only upon Jungian psychology but transpersonal psychology generally, offers an avenue for teachers to probe the spiritual dimensions of teaching and learning in non-dogmatic terms.

Mayes' most recent work, Teaching and Learning for Wholeness: The Role of Archetypes in Educational Processes (2017), develops his ongoing project of incorporating into Jungian pedagogy the psychoanalytic theories of Heinz Kohut (particularly Kohut's notion of the selfobject) and the object relations theory of Ronald Fairbairn and D.W. Winnicott. Some of Mayes' work in curriculum theory, especially Seven Curricular Landscapes: An Approach to the Holistic Curriculum (2003) and Understanding the Whole Student: Holistic Multicultural Education (2007), is concerned with holistic education.

== Archetypes and pedagogy ==
Archetypes are, according to Swiss psychologist Carl Jung, innate universal psychic dispositions that form the substrate from which the basic themes of human life emerge. Being universal and innate, their influence can be detected in the form of myths, symbols, rituals and instincts of human beings. Archetypes are components of the collective unconscious and serve to organize, direct and inform human thought and behaviour.

According to Jung, archetypes heavily influence the human life cycle, propelling a neurologically hard-wired sequence which he called the stages of life. Each stage is mediated through a new set of archetypal imperatives which seek fulfillment in action. These may include being parented, initiation, courtship, marriage and preparation for death.

Pedagogy, or paedagogy, is the art or science of being a teacher. The term generally refers to strategies of instruction, or a style of instruction. Pedagogy is also sometimes referred to as the correct use of teaching strategies (see instructional theory). Pedagogy comes from the ancient Greek παιδαγωγία, of παιδός ([paiˈdos]) "child" and ἄγω ([ˈaɡɔː) "to drive, to raise, to take the way".

Archetypal pedagogy is the discovery of self and knowledge by means of the archetypes.

The archetypes are innate, universal prototypes for ideas and may be used to interpret observations. A group of memories and interpretations associated with an archetype is a complex, e.g. a mother complex associated with the mother archetype. Jung treated the archetypes as psychological organs, analogous to physical ones in that both are morphological constructs that arose through evolution. For example, an archetype "is as much an organ to the psyche as the liver is to metabolism".

Archetypes can help educators become more deeply self-aware and recognize themselves in the collective unconscious or "soul of the world" through images of not only 'the teacher' but also "healers, great mothers, warriors, visionaries, tricksters, and so on". Teachers can engage in a process of archetypal reflectivity through such practices as journal work, interpersonal writing exercises, meditation, or even psychotherapy in order to make unconscious factors of their teaching practice conscious and "to 'surface' the deeper images and assumptions that inform their sense of calling and classroom practice".

== Archetypal dimensions for teacher reflection ==
Teacher as the Icarus Archetype:
Like Icarus, a teacher's "wax wings will melt in the unforgiving daily sun of classroom reality" if they lack the humility to recognize themselves as "co-learners" involved in the process of learning with their students.

Teachers who function as "co-learners" and authoritative facilitators create the best classroom environments

Teacher as "co-learner" is balanced by two Archetypes:
The Sage – has already conquered many challenges and developed a deeper understanding of life's lessons.
The Novitiate – the novice, beginner who is about to embark on his/her life journey, but has yet to conquer the challenges. This archetypal orientation (Sage/Novitiate) frees the teacher "from the impossible burden of feeling that [they] must have all the answers" that is characteristic of the omniscient all-knowing authority figure archetypes: the Wise One, the Great Mother and the Great Father.

Student as Hero Archetype:
The student is understood as the Novitiate-hero (the novice) who is beginning the individuation quest.

Teacher as Sage Archetype:
The Novitiate-hero meets the wise old man or woman who has already completed his or her archetypal quest. As this Sage encourages the Novitiate through the guidance of riddles and conundrums, the Novitiate's world is deconstructed, thus forcing the Novitiate to seek "a higher wisdom".

Teacher as an Archetype of Spirit:
Mayes explores four variations of Jung's idea of teacher as archetype of spirit.

1. Discursive Spirituality – Teacher as philosopher

Potential: when archetype is balanced it can foster 'cognitive intelligence' and 'higher order thinking'
Problem: over emphasis on this archetype constricts other domains i.e. poetics and spiritual insights

2. Civic Spirituality – Teacher as national prophet

Potential: calls students to their "noblest traditions and aspirations" in terms of social justice and communal equity.
Problem: the teacher as a shadow prophet can call students toward a "bias against merit, wealth, individual achievement" – understanding these to be racist vices.

3. Ontological Spirituality – Teacher as Zen master, counsellor, mother

Potential: Zen teaching becomes a mysterious and paradoxical form of "non-teaching" and counsellor/mother teaching is grounded in receptiveness, relatedness and responsiveness (focused on the needs of the Other).
Problem: The ontological exemplar can deteriorate into elitism, anti-intellectualism and self-absorption for both teacher and student.

4. Incarnational Spirituality – Teacher as priest

Potential: Teacher becomes "minister of light and love", and teaching is seen as a sacred act that incarnates religious doctrine into a teaching practice in order to create a positive learning environment for all students (regardless of faith commitment).
Problem: Teachers may consciously or unconsciously project their faith commitments onto their students in the context of increasingly multicultural classrooms.

=== Individuation and self-realization ===
Individuation is a process of psychological differentiation, having for its goal the development of the individual personality. "In general, it is the process by which individual beings are formed and differentiated; in particular, it is the development of the psychological individual as a being distinct from the general, collective psychology" (C.G. Jung. Psychological Types. Collected Works Vol. 6., par. 757).

An innate need for self-realization leads people to explore and integrate these rejected materials. This natural process is called individuation, or the process of becoming an individual.

According to Jung, self-realization can be divided into two distinct tiers. In the first half of their lives, humans separate from humanity. They attempt to create their own identities (I, myself). This is why there is such a need for young men to be destructive, and can be expressed as animosity from teens directed at their parents. Jung also said they have a sort of "second puberty" that occurs between 35 and 40 – outlook shifts from emphasis on materialism, sexuality, and having children to concerns about community and spirituality.

In the second half of their lives, humans reunite with the human race. They become part of the collective once again. This is when adults start to contribute to humanity (volunteer time, build, garden, create art, etc.) rather than destroy. They are also more likely to pay attention to their unconscious and conscious feelings. Young men rarely say "I feel angry." or "I feel sad." This is because they have not yet rejoined the human collective experience, commonly reestablished in their older, wiser years, according to Jung. A common theme is for young rebels to "search" for their true selves and realize that a contribution to humanity is essentially a necessity for a whole self.

Jung proposes that the ultimate goal of the collective unconscious and self-realization is to pull humans to the highest experience. This, of course, is spiritual.

== See also ==
- Archetypal psychology
