= Wise Old Man and Wise Old Woman =

Jungian archetypes of the collective unconscious

In Jungian psychology, the Wise Old Woman and the Wise Old Man are archetypes of the collective unconscious.

The Wise Old Woman, or helpful old woman, "is a well-known symbol in myths and fairy tales for the wisdom of the eternal female nature." The Wise Old Man, "or some other very powerful aspect of eternal masculinity" is her male counterpart.

== Individuation ==
In Carl Jung's thought, the individuation process was marked by a sequence of archetypes, each acquiring predominance at successive stages, and so reflecting what he termed an ascending psychic scale or "hierarchy of the unconscious". Thus, beginning with the intermediate position of "anima or animus...just as the latter have a higher position in the hierarchy than the shadow, so wholeness lays claim to a position and a value superior," still. The Wise Old Woman and Man, as what he termed Mana or supraordinate personalities, stood for that wholeness of the self: "the mother ("Primordial Mother" and "Earth Mother") as a supraordinary personality...as the 'self'."

As Marie-Louise von Franz put it:

If an individual has wrestled seriously and long enough with the anima (or animus) problem, so that he, or she, is no longer partially identified with it, the unconscious again changes its dominant character and appears in a new symbolic form representing the Self, the innermost nucleus of the personality. In the dreams of a woman this centre is usually personified as a superior female figure – a priestess, sorceress, earth mother, or goddess of nature or love. In the case of a man, it manifests itself as a masculine initiator and guardian (an Indian guru), a wise old man, a spirit of nature and so forth.

The masculine initiator was described by Jung as "a figure of the same sex corresponding to the father-imago...the mana-personality [a]s a dominant of the collective unconscious, the recognized archetype of the mighty man in the form of hero, chief, magician, medicine-man, saint, the ruler of men and spirits." Similarly, "the wise Old Woman figure represented by Hecate or the Crone...the Great Mother" stood for an aspect of the mother-imago. The archetypes of the collective unconscious can thus be seen as inner representations of the same-sex parent—as an "imago built up from parental influences plus the specific reactions of the child." Consequently, for the Jungian, "the making conscious of those contents which constitute the archetype of the mana personality signifies therefore "for the man the second and true liberation from the father, for the woman that from the mother, and therewith the first perception of their own unique individuality'."

== Mana attributes: positive and negative ==
In Jung's view, "all archetypes spontaneously develop favourable and unfavourable, light and dark, good and bad effects." Thus "the 'good Wise Man' must here be contrasted with a correspondingly dark, chthonic figure," and in the same way, the priestess or sibyl has her counterpart in the figure of "the witch...called by Jung the 'terrible mother'." Taken together, male and female, "The hunter or old magician and the witch correspond to the negative parental images in the magic world of the unconscious."

However, judgement of such collective archetypes must not be hasty: "Just as all archetypes have a positive, favourable, bright side that points upwards, so also they have one that points downwards, partly negative and unfavourable, partly chthonic"—so that, for example, "the sky-woman is the positive, the bear the negative aspect of the 'supraordinate personality', which extends the conscious human being upwards into the celestial and downwards into the animal regions." Yet both aspects, celestial and chthonic, were of equal value for Jung, as he sought for what he termed a coniunctio oppositorum, a union of opposites. "One does not become enlightened by imagining figures of light," he argued, "but by making the darkness conscious." Similarly, with respect to the goal of the individuation process itself, "as a totality, the self is a coincidentia oppositorum; it is therefore bright and dark and yet neither." At this stage of development one possesses discernment or some other virtue.

Coming to terms with the Mana figures of the collective unconscious—with the parental imagos—thus meant overcoming a psychic splitting, so as to make possible an acceptance of "the Twisted side of the Great Mother"; an acceptance of the way "the father contains both Kings at once...the Twisted King and the Whole King."

== See also ==
- Archetypal psychology
