= Shadow (psychology) =

Concept in Jungian psychology

In analytical psychology, the shadow (also known as ego-dystonic complex, repressed id, shadow aspect, or shadow archetype) is an unconscious aspect of the personality that does not correspond with the ego ideal, leading the ego to resist and project the shadow, creating conflict with it. The shadow may be personified as archetypes which relate to the collective unconscious, such as the trickster.

== Overview ==
Carl Jung characterized the shadow as the blind spot of the psyche. The repression of one's id, while maladaptive, prevents shadow integration, the union of id and ego. While they are regarded as differing on their theories of the function of repression of id in civilization, Sigmund Freud and Carl Jung coalesced at Platonism, wherein id rejects the nomos. Persona is contrasted against the shadow. Jung regarded the shadow as unconscious – id and biography – suppressed under the superego's ego-ideal, the way the superego wants to be. The shadow is projected onto one's social environment as cognitive distortions. However, the shadow can also be regarded as "roughly equivalent to the whole of the Freudian unconscious", and Jung himself asserted that "the result of the Freudian method of elucidation is a minute elaboration of man's shadow side unexampled in any previous age".

Contrary to a Freudian definition of shadow, the idea can include everything outside the light of consciousness and may be positive or negative. Because a subject can repress awareness or conceal self-threatening aspects of the self, consensus of the idea of the shadow that it is a negative function in the self, despite the extent of the repression failing to prohibit these aspects. There are positive aspects that can remain hidden in one's shadow – especially in people with low self-esteem, anxieties, and false beliefs – with these aspects being brought to the conscious mind and exercised through analysis and therapy. It may be considered the subject's identification with id, superseded in early childhood, though it can also be influenced by early to late childhood.

Jung wrote that if awareness of the projection of the shadow remains repressed, "the projection-making factor (the Shadow archetype) then has a free hand and can realize its object – if it has one – or bring about some other situation characteristic of its power", lending the idea autonomous qualities which can have consequences on the id and the ego. These projections insulate and delude individuals in society by acting as a symbolically deployed barrier between the ego and the ego-less Real.

=== Collective shadow ===
The collective unconscious, a concept that states that all of humanity shares some unconscious ideals, forms a projective identification with uncertainty and feelings of helplessness along with other negative feelings. This projection frequently identifies with the figure of the Devil as the "fourth" aspect of the Pauline-Christian trinity, functioning as its grounding myth. This idea can be seen in other mythologies, for instance, the ancient-Egyptian-devil Set "represents overwhelming affects". The collective shadow is ancestral and is carried by the collective experience of the human race (i.e., in-group and out-group: dehumanization; e.g., hate crime).

== Appearance ==
Jungians believe that the shadow aspect of the Self may appear in dreams and visions (i.e., mise-en-scène), in various forms and typically "appears as a person of the same sex as that of the dreamer." The shadow's appearance and role depend greatly on the living experience of the individual because much of the shadow develops in the individual's mind rather than simply being inherited from the collective unconscious and is important in the Jungian approach to dream interpretation. Nevertheless, some Jungians maintain that "the shadow contains, besides the personal shadow, the shadow of society [...] fed by the neglected and repressed collective values."

Jung also made the suggestion that the shadow may be made up of many layers. The top layers contain the meaningful flow and manifestations of direct personal experiences. These are made unconscious in the individual by such things as the change of attention from one thing to another, simple forgetfulness, or a repression. Underneath these specific layers, however, are the archetypes which form the psychic contents of all human experiences. Jung described this deeper layer as "a psychic activity which goes on independently of the conscious mind and is not dependent even on the upper layers of the unconscious – untouched, and perhaps untouchable – by personal experience."

== Encountering the shadow ==
As the shadow is a part of the unconscious, a method called "shadow work" is practiced through active imagination with daydreaming and meditation – the experience is then mediated by dialectical interpretation through narrative and art (pottery, poetry, drawing, dancing, singing, etc.); analysts perform dreamwork on analysands, using amplification to raise the unconscious to conscious awareness. Jung uses the term Nekyia to describe the descent into darkness, where the ego fades.

The eventual encounter with the shadow plays a central part in the process of individuation. Jung considered that "the course of individuation [...] exhibits a certain formal regularity. Its signposts and milestones are various archetypal symbols" marking its stages; and of these "the first stage leads to the experience of the shadow." If "the breakdown of the persona constitutes the typical Jungian moment both in therapy and in development," it is this that opens the road to the shadow within, coming about when "beneath the surface a person is suffering from a deadly boredom that makes everything seem meaningless and empty...as if the initial encounter with the Self casts a dark shadow ahead of time." Jung considered as a perennial danger in life that "the more consciousness gains in clarity, the more monarchic becomes its content...the king constantly needs the renewal that begins with a descent into his own darkness" – his shadow – which the "dissolution of the persona" sets in motion.

"The shadow personifies everything that the subject refuses to acknowledge about himself", whether consciously or unconsciously, and represents "a tight passage, a narrow door, whose painful constriction no one is spared who goes down to the deep well."

[If and when] an individual makes an attempt to see his shadow, he becomes aware of (and often ashamed of) those qualities and impulses he denies in himself but can plainly see in others – such things as egotism, mental laziness, and sloppiness; unreal fantasies, schemes, and plots; carelessness and cowardice; inordinate love of money and possessions...

The dissolution of the persona and the launch of the individuation process also brings with it "the danger of falling victim to the shadow ... the black shadow which everybody carries with him, the inferior and therefore hidden aspect of the personality" – resulting in a merger with the shadow.

== Merging with the shadow ==
Jung considered merging with the shadow as typically bad, viewing it as the process of the suppressed identity overwriting or controlling the ego. According to Jung, the shadow sometimes overwhelms a person's actions; for example, when the conscious mind is shocked, confused, or paralyzed by indecision. "A man who is possessed by his shadow is always standing in his own light and falling into his own traps...living below his own level." Hence, in terms of the story of Dr. Jekyll and Mr. Hyde, "it must be Jekyll, the conscious personality, who integrates the shadow ... and not vice versa. Otherwise the conscious becomes the slave of the autonomous shadow."

Individuation inevitably raises that very possibility as it further separates the ego from the collective unconsciousness. As the process continues, and "the libido leaves the bright upper world... sinks back into its own depths... below, in the shadows of the unconscious." so too what comes to the forefront is "what was hidden under the mask of conventional adaptation: the shadow", with the result that "ego and shadow are no longer divided but are brought together in an – admittedly precarious – unity."

The effect of such "confrontation with the shadow produces at first a dead balance, a standstill that hampers moral decisions and makes convictions ineffective ... nigredo, tenebrositas, chaos, melancholia." Consequently, as Jung knew from personal experience: "In this time of descent – one, three, seven years, more or less – genuine courage and strength are required", with no certainty of emergence. Nevertheless, Jung remained of the opinion that while "no one should deny the danger of the descent [...] every descent is followed by an ascent", and assimilation of – rather than possession by – the shadow becomes a possibility.

== Assimilation of the shadow ==
Assimilation is the process of acknowledging the shadow and possibly incorporating parts of it into the ego. Jungians believe this may lead to a numinous experience, while anchoring to the numinosum effect without reality testing can lead to ego inflation (qv., archetypal possession).

In analytical psychology, the struggle for the superego is to retain awareness of the shadow, but not to become it or be controlled by it. "Non-identification demands considerable moral effort [which] prevents a descent into that darkness"; and though "the conscious mind is liable to be submerged at any moment in the unconscious...understanding acts like a life-saver. It integrates the unconscious." This reincorporates the shadow into the personality, producing a stronger, wider consciousness than before. "Assimilation of the shadow gives a man body, so to speak," thereby providing a launchpad for further individuation. "The integration of the shadow, or the realization of the personal unconscious, marks the first stage in the analytic process... without it a recognition of anima and animus is impossible." Conversely, "to the degree in which the shadow is recognised and integrated, the problem of the anima, i.e., of relationship, is constellated," and becomes the centre of the individuation quest.

Carolyn Kaufman wrote that "in spite of its function as a reservoir for human darkness – or perhaps because of this – the shadow is the seat of creativity;" so that for some, it may be that "the dark side of his being, his sinister shadow...represents the true spirit of life as against the arid scholar." Nevertheless, Jungians warn that "acknowledgement of the shadow must be a continuous process throughout one's life;" and even after the focus of individuation has moved on to the animus/anima, "the later stages of shadow integration" will continue to take place – the grim "process of washing one's dirty linen in private," of accepting one's shadow.

== See also ==
- Alter ego
- Anger management
- Antagonist
- Anticathexis
- Apollonian and Dionysian
- Bias blind spot
- Big Five personality traits
- Cognitive bias
- Cognitive dissonance
- Cognitive distortion
- Compartmentalization (psychology)
- Death drive
- Doppelgänger
- Egosyntonic and egodystonic
- Eros (concept)
- Eudaimonia
- Homunculus argument
- Inferiority complex
- Shade (mythology)
- Shadow person
- The Shadow (fairy tale)
- Transpersonal psychology
- Yin and yang
