= Anima and animus =

Jungian theory

The anima and animus are a pair of twin concepts developed by Carl Jung which inform the human psyche in Jungian psychology. Jung described the animus as the unconscious masculine side of a woman, and the anima as the unconscious feminine side of a man.

Anima and animus are described in analytical psychology and archetypal psychology under the umbrella of transpersonal psychology. They are considered animistic parts within the Self, with Jung viewing parts of the self as part of the infinite set of archetypes within the collective unconscious. Modern Jungian clinical theory under these frameworks considers a syzygy-without-its-partner to be like yin without yang. The goal is to become integrated over time into a well-functioning whole, similar to positive psychology's understanding of a well-tuned personality through something like a Goldilocks principle. For men, this involves accepting eros, or desire for connection; for women, this means developing logos, or reason and rationality. A therapist's empathetic countertransference can reveal that logos and/or eros are in need of repair through a psychopomp guide to mediate between the unconscious and conscious of the identified patient's Self.

== Overview ==
In Jung's theory, the anima makes up the totality of the unconscious feminine psychological qualities that a man possesses and the animus the masculine ones possessed by a woman. Jung's theory states that the anima and animus are the two primary anthropomorphic archetypes of the unconscious mind, as opposed to the theriomorphic and inferior function of the shadow archetypes. He did not believe they were an aggregate of father or mother, brothers, sisters, aunts, uncles, or teachers, though these aspects of the personal unconscious can influence a person's anima or animus. He believed they are the abstract symbol sets that formulate the archetype of the Self.

Jung believed a male's sensitivity is often lesser or repressed, and therefore considered the anima one of the most significant autonomous complexes. Jung believed that the anima and the animus manifest themselves by appearing in dreams and influence a person's attitudes and interactions with the opposite sex. A natural understanding of another member of the opposite sex is instilled in individuals that stems from constant subjection to members of the opposite sex. This instillment leads to the development of the anima and animus. Jung said that "the encounter with the shadow is the 'apprentice-piece' in the individual's development ... that with the anima is the 'masterpiece'". Jung viewed the anima process as being one of the sources of creative ability.

== Origin ==
The related Greek word anemos means "wind" for both anima and animus; pneuma is another word for wind, meaning "spirit".

=== Anima ===
Jung defines anima with its Latin derivation, meaning "soul". Jung associates anima with Aphrodite, Selene, Persephone, Hecate, Minerva, and Pandora.

Jung began using the term in the early 1920s to describe the inner feminine side of men.

["A]nima is the archetype of life itself. (1954, par. 66)[".]

— Carl Jung

=== Animus ===
Jung defines animus with its Latin derivation, meaning "spirit". In 1923, it began being used as a term in Jungian psychology to describe the masculine side of women.

== Stages of eroticism ==
Jung believed anima development has four distinct levels of Eros, which in The Practice of Psychotherapy he named Eve, Helen of Troy, Mary, mother of Jesus and Sophia. In broad terms, the entire process of anima development in a man is about the male subject opening up to emotionality, and in that way a broader spirituality, by creating a new conscious paradigm that includes intuitive processes, creativity and imagination, and psychic sensitivity towards himself and others where it might not have existed previously.

=== Eve – Object of desire, provider of nourishment, security and love ===
The first is Eve, named after the Genesis account of Adam and Eve. It deals with the emergence of a man's object of desire. The anima is completely tied up with woman as provider of nourishment, security and love.

The man at this anima level cannot function well without a woman, and is more likely to be controlled by her or, more likely, by his own imaginary construction of her.

=== Helen – Worldly achiever, intelligent and talented ===
The second is Helen, an allusion to Helen of Troy in Greek mythology. In this phase, women are viewed as capable of worldly success and of being self-reliant, intelligent and insightful, even if not altogether virtuous. This second phase is meant to show a strong schism in external talents (cultivated business and conventional skills) with lacking internal qualities (inability for virtue, lacking faith or imagination).

=== Mary – Righteous and a paragon of virtue ===
The third phase is Mary, named after the Christian theological understanding of the Virgin Mary (Jesus' mother). At this level, women can now seem to possess virtue by the perceiving man (even if in an esoteric and dogmatic way), in as much as certain activities deemed consciously unvirtuous cannot be applied to her.

=== Sophia – Wise and fully human, equal and not at all an object ===
The fourth and final phase of anima development is Sophia, named after the Greek word for wisdom. Complete integration has now occurred, which allows women to be seen and related to as particular individuals who possess both positive and negative qualities. The most important aspect of this final level is that, as the personification "Wisdom" suggests, the anima is now developed enough that no single object can fully and permanently contain the images to which it is related.

== Stages of logos development ==
Jung focused more on the man's anima and wrote less about the woman's animus. Jung believed that every woman has an analogous animus within her psyche, this being a set of unconscious masculine attributes and potentials. He viewed the animus as being more complex than the anima, postulating that women have a host of animus images whereas the male anima consists only of one dominant image.

Jung stated that there are four parallel levels of animus development in a woman.

=== Tarzan – Man of mere physical power ===
The animus "first appears as a personification of mere physical power – for instance as an athletic champion or muscle man, such as 'the fictional jungle hero Tarzan'".

=== Byron – Man of action or romance ===
In the next phase, the animus "possesses initiative and the capacity for planned action ... the romantic man – the 19th century British poet Byron; or the man of action – America's Ernest Hemingway, war hero, hunter, etc."

=== Lloyd George – Man as a professor, clergyman, orator ===
In the third phase "the animus becomes the word, often appearing as a professor or clergyman ... the bearer of the word – Lloyd George, the great political orator".

=== Hermes – Man as a spiritual guide ===
"Finally, in his fourth manifestation, the animus is the incarnation of meaning. On this highest level he becomes (like the anima) a mediator of ... spiritual profundity". Jung noted that "in mythology, this aspect of the animus appears as Hermes, messenger of the gods; in dreams he is a helpful guide." Like Sophia, this is the highest level of mediation between the unconscious and conscious mind. In the book The Invisible Partners, John A. Sanford said that the key to controlling one's anima/animus is to recognize it when it manifests and exercise our ability to discern the anima/animus from reality.

== Anima and animus compared ==
Hillman states that anima can mean "tawdry, trite, trivial, barren, and cheap". Hillman states that animus "refers to spirit, to logos, word, idea, intellect, principle, abstraction, meaning, ratio, nous." Hillman proposes "another definition of anima: archetype of psyche.

The four roles are not identical with genders reversed. Jung believed that while the anima tended to appear as a relatively singular female personality, the animus may consist of a conjunction of multiple male personalities: "in this way the unconscious symbolizes the fact that the animus represents a collective rather than a personal element".

The process of animus development deals with cultivating an independent and non-socially subjugated idea of self by embodying a deeper word (as per a specific existential outlook) and manifesting this word. To clarify, this does not mean that a female subject becomes more set in her ways (as this word is steeped in emotionality, subjectivity, and a dynamism just as a well-developed anima is) but that she is more internally aware of what she believes and feels, and is more capable of expressing these beliefs and feelings. Thus the "animus in his most developed form sometimes ... make[s] her even more receptive than a man to new creative ideas".

Both final stages of animus and anima development have dynamic qualities (related to the motion and flux of this continual developmental process), open-ended qualities (there is no static perfected ideal or manifestation of the quality in question), and pluralistic qualities (which transcend the need for a singular image, as any subject or object can contain multiple archetypes or even seemingly antithetical roles). They also form bridges to the next archetypal figures to emerge, as "the unconscious again changes its dominant character and appears in a new symbolic form, representing the Self".

Jung's theory of anima and animus draws from his theory of individuation. In order for a person to reach the goal of individuation is to engage in a series of intrapersonal dialogues which help the person understand how he or she relates to the world. This process requires men and women to become aware of their anima or animus respectively, in so doing the individual will learn how not to be controlled by their anima or animus. As individuals are made aware of their anima or animus, it allows them to overcome thoughts of who they ought to be and accept themselves for who they really are. According to Jung, individuals can discover a bridge to the collective unconscious through the development of their anima or animus. The anima and the animus represent the unconscious. The anima and animus are not gender specific and men and women can have both, however, more empirical research is required to determine whether both men and women do possess both archetypes.

== Jungian cautions ==
Jungians warn that "every personification of the unconscious—the shadow, the anima, the animus, and the Self—has both a light and a dark aspect. ... the anima and animus have dual aspects: They can bring life-giving development and creativeness to the personality, or they can cause petrification and physical death".

One danger is what Jung termed "invasion" of the conscious by the unconscious archetype: "Possession caused by the anima ... bad taste: the anima surrounds herself with inferior people". Jung insisted that "a state of anima possession ... must be prevented. The anima is thereby forced into the inner world, where she functions as the medium between the ego and the unconscious, as does the persona between the ego and the environment".

Alternatively, over-awareness of the anima or animus could provide a premature conclusion to the individuation process—"a kind of psychological short-circuit, to identify the animus at least provisionally with wholeness". Instead of being "content with an intermediate position", the animus seeks to usurp "the self, with which the patient's animus identifies. This identification is a regular occurrence when the shadow, the dark side, has not been sufficiently realized".

== See also ==
- Anima mundi
- Animism
- Homunculus
- Other (philosophy)
- Panpsychism
- Rosary of the Philosophers
- Subpersonality
- The Symbolic
- Unconscious mind
- Unus mundus
