= Self in Jungian psychology =

Psychological concept

The central dot represents the Ego whereas the Self can be said to consist of the whole with the centred dot.

The Self in Jungian psychology is a dynamic concept which has undergone numerous modifications since it was first conceptualised as one of the Jungian archetypes.

Historically, the Self, according to Carl Jung, signifies the unification of consciousness and unconsciousness in a person, and representing the psyche as a whole. It is realized as the product of individuation, which in his view is the process of integrating various aspects of one's personality. For Jung, the Self is an encompassing whole which acts as a container. It could be symbolized by a circle, a square, or a mandala.

== Two center hypothesis ==
The idea that there are two centers of the personality distinguished Jungian psychology at one time. The ego has been seen as the center of consciousness, whereas the Self is defined as the center of the total personality, which includes consciousness, the unconscious, and the ego; the Self is both the whole and the center. While the ego is a self-contained center of the circle contained within the whole, the Self can be understood as the greater circle.

== Emergence of the Self ==
Jung considered that from birth every individual has an original sense of wholeness – of the Self – but that with development a separate ego-consciousness crystallizes out of the original feeling of unity. This process of ego-differentiation provides the task of the first half of one's life-course, though Jungians also saw psychic health as depending on a periodic return to the sense of Self, something facilitated by the use of myths, initiation ceremonies, and rites of passage.

== Return to the Self: individuation ==
Once ego-differentiation had been more or less successfully achieved and the individual is somewhat anchored in the external world, Jung considered that a new task then arose for the second half of life – a return to, and conscious rediscovery of, the Self: individuation. Marie-Louise von Franz states that "The actual processes of individuation – the conscious coming-to-terms with one's own inner center (psychic nucleus) or Self – generally begins with a wounding of the personality". The ego reaches an impasse of one sort or another; and has to turn for help to what she termed "a sort of hidden regulating or directing tendency...[an] organizing center" in the personality: "Jung called this center the 'Self' and described it as the totality of the whole psyche, in order to distinguish it from the 'ego', which constitutes only a small part of the psyche".

Under the Self's guidance, a succession of archetypal images emerges, gradually bringing their fragmentary aspects of the Self increasingly closer to its totality. The first to appear, and the closest to the ego, would be the shadow or personal unconscious – something which is at the same time the first representation of the total personality, and which may indeed be at times conflated with the Self. Next to appear would be the Anima and Animus, the soul-image, which may be taken as symbolising the whole Self. Ideally however, the animus or anima comes into play in a mediating role between the ego and the Self. The third main archetype to emerge is the Mana figure of the wise old man/woman – a representative of the collective unconscious akin to the Self.

Thereafter comes the archetype of the Self itself – the last point on the route to self-realization of individuation. In Jung's words, "the Self...embraces ego-consciousness, shadow, anima, and collective unconscious in indeterminable extension. As a totality, the self is a coincidentia oppositorum; it is therefore bright and dark and yet neither". Alternatively, he stated that "the Self is the total, timeless man...who stands for the mutual integration of conscious and unconscious". Jung recognized many dream images as representing the self, including a stone, the world tree, an elephant, and the Christ.

== Perils of the Self ==
Von Franz considered that "the dark side of the Self is the most dangerous thing of all, precisely because the Self is the greatest power in the psyche. It can cause people to 'spin' megalomanic or fall into other delusionary fantasies that catch them up", so that the subject "thinks with mounting excitement" that he has grasped the great cosmic riddles. He therefore risks losing all touch with human reality.

In everyday life, aspects of the Self may be projected onto outside figures or concepts such as the state, God, the universe or fate. When such projections are withdrawn, there can be a destructive inflation of the personality – one potential counterbalance to this being however the social or collective aspects of the Self.

== Evolution of the Jungian concept of Self ==
Young-Eisendrath and Hall write that 'in Jung's work, self can refer to the notion of inherent subjective individuality, the idea of an abstract center or central ordering principle, and the account of a process developing over time'.

In 1947 Michael Fordham proposed a distinct theory of the primary self to describe the state of the psyche of neonates, characterised by homeostasis, or 'steady state' in his words, where self and other (usually the mother) are undifferentiated. It predicates that there is no distinction between the internal and external world, and there are as yet no different components in the internal world. Fordham derived his hypothesis partly from the Jungian concept of the archetype of the self, and the psychoanalytic idea of internal 'objects'. The primary self, taken as the original totality of each person, with its 'archetypal' tendencies to develop aspects, such as language, complexes etc., enters into relation with the external world through a continuous dual process of de-integration and re-integration, a process said to be characteristic of the first half of life.

Redfearn, for instance, who has also synthesised the classical archetypal theory with a developmental view based on years of clinical observation, sees the self as probably consisting of a range of subpersonalities over a lifetime.

According to Peter Fonagy the connections between "post-Freudians" and "post-Jungians" have been further strengthened after the advent of contemporary neuroscience in this connection, as outlined in his foreword to Jean Knox's update on the "formation of internal working models", which he describes as a milestone.

=== Objection ===
Fritz Perls objected that 'many psychologists like to write the self with a capital S, as if the self would be something precious, something extraordinarily valuable. They go at the discovery of the self like a treasure-digging. The self means nothing but this thing as it is defined by otherness'.

== See also ==
- Self (psychology)
- Socialization
