= Anthony Stevens (Jungian analyst) =

British psychiatrist (1933–2023)

Anthony Stevens (27 March 1933 – 13 July 2023) was a British Jungian analyst, psychiatrist and prolific writer of books and articles on psychotherapy, evolutionary psychiatry and the scientific implications of Jung's theory of archetypes.

== Early life and career ==
Anthony Stevens was born in Plymouth on 27 March 1933. A graduate of Oxford University, where he studied under Carolus Oldfield in the Department of Psychology in the 1950s, Stevens had two degrees in psychology in addition to a research doctorate (MD); during the 1950s Stevens also studied under Oldfield in the Department of Psychology at Reading. He was a member of the Royal College of Psychiatrists and a senior member of the Independent Group of Analytical Psychologists.

Early in his career Stevens did research under the supervision of John Bowlby into the development of attachment bonds between infants and their nurses at the Metera Babies Centre in Athens. This led him to appreciate the role played by archetypal components in the formation of mother-child attachments and was to provide him with the basic insights which inspired his magnum opus, Archetype : A Natural History of The Self.

== Archetype : A Natural History of The Self ==
In Archetype, Stevens examines the close conceptual parallelism that exists between the "patterns of behaviour" and their underlying "innate releasing mechanisms" studied by ethology (the branch of biology which studies animal behaviour in the wild) and Jung's notion of archetypes functioning as "active living dispositions" in the human "collective unconscious". He suggested that together the two disciplines of ethology and analytical psychology could provide the tools required to examine how the human psyche has evolved out of its reptilian, mammalian, and primate precursors to assume the characteristics that are apparent in us at the present time. In addition to maternal attachment, he used this approach to elucidate such phenomena as xenophobia, puberty initiation, sexual bonding, the developmental programme evident in the human life cycle, and so on, attempting to demonstrate that each had an archetypal basis in the genetic endowment and phylogenetic history of our species. In subsequent books and papers he applies the same approach to dreams, symbolism, warfare, and psychiatry.

== Later life and death ==
Stevens lived in retirement on the Greek island of Corfu. He died on 13 July 2023, at the age of 90.

== Publications ==
- Stevens, Anthony (1968). "One of the greatest institutions notes on a psychiatrist's love affair with Babies' Centre Metera". Clinical Pediatrics. 12 (8A – 28A).
- Stevens, Anthony (1971). "Attachment behaviour, separation anxiety and stranger anxiety in polymatrically reared infants". In Schaffer, H. F. (ed.). The Origins of Human Social Relations. Academic Press.
- Stevens, Anthony (1982). "Attenuation of the mother-child bond and male initiation into adult life". Journal of Adolescence. 4 (2): 131–148. doi:10.1016/S0140-1971(81)80032-2. PMID 7276301.
- Stevens, Anthony (1982). Archetype: A Natural History of the Self. New York: William Morrow & Co.
- Stevens, Anthony (1982). "Attachment and the Art of Staying in One Place". In Apley, John; Ounsted, Christopher (eds.). One Child. London: William Heinemann Medical Books.
- Stevens, Anthony (1982). "Withymead and the arts in residential therapy". Journal for Jungian Studies. 28: 33–44.
- Stevens, Anthony (1986). "The Archetypes of War". In Fenton, Ian W. (ed.). The Psychology of Nuclear Conflict. London: Coventure.
- Stevens, Anthony (1986). Withymead: A Jungian Community for the Healing Arts. London: Coventure.
- Stevens, Anthony (1989). The Roots of War: A Jungian Perspective. New York: Paragon House.
- 1990: On Jung. Routledge (hardback), London.
- 1991: On Jung. Penguin (paperback), London.
- 1991: 'War and Creativity'. In Harry A. Wilmer (ed.), Creativity: Paradoxes and Reflections, with a Preface by Lionel Pauling. Chiron Publications, Wilmette, IL.
- 1993: The Two Million-Year-Old Self. Texas A&M University Press, College Station. Republished in paperback by Fromm International in 1997.
- 1994: Jung. Past Masters Series. Oxford University Press, Oxford. Republished in 2000 in the Very Short Introduction series.
- 1995: Private Myths: Dreams and Dreaming. Hamish Hamilton, London, and Harvard University Press, Cambridge, MA. Published in paperback by Penguin Books, London, in 1996.
- 1996: Evolutionary Psychiatry: A New Beginning. Written in collaboration with John Price. Routledge, London.
- 1997: 'Critical notice: a lengthy critical review of The Jung Cult and The Aryan Christ by Richard Noll'. The Journal of Analytical Psychology, 42 (4), 671–89.
- 1998: Ariadne's Clue: A Guide to the Symbols of Humankind. Princeton University Press, Princeton, NJ. Reprint. 1999. Allen Lane, London. Reprint. 2000. Penguin, London; Princeton University Press, Princeton, NJ.
- 1998: An Intelligent Person's Guide to Psychotherapy. Duckworth, London.
- 1998: 'Response to P. Pietikainen'. The Journal of Analytical Psychology, 43 (3), 345–55.
- 1999: On Jung, Second Edition, with a Reply to Jung's Critics. Penguin, London, and The Princeton University Press, Princeton, NJ.
- 2000: Prophets, Cults and Madness. Written in collaboration with John Price. Duckworth, London.
- 2000: 'Jungian Analysis and Evolutionary Psychotherapy: An Integrative Approach'. In Paul Gilbert (ed.), Genes on the Couch: Explorations in Evolutionary Psychotherapy. Routledge, London.
- 2002: Archetype Revisited: An Updated Natural History of the Self. Brunner-Routledge, London; Inner City Books, Toronto.
- 2002: Evolutionary Psychiatry: A New Beginning, Second Edition. Written in collaboration with John Price. Routledge, London.
- 2004: The Roots of War and Terror. Continuum, London.
- 2006: 'The Archetypes'. In Renos K. Papadopoulos (ed.), The Handbook of Jungian Psychology: Theory, Practice and Applications. Routledge, London.
- 2013: The Talking Cure, in three volumes. Inner City Books, Toronto.
- 2016: Living Archetypes: the Selected Works of Anthony Stevens. Routledge, London.
