= Clifford Mayes =

American psychologist

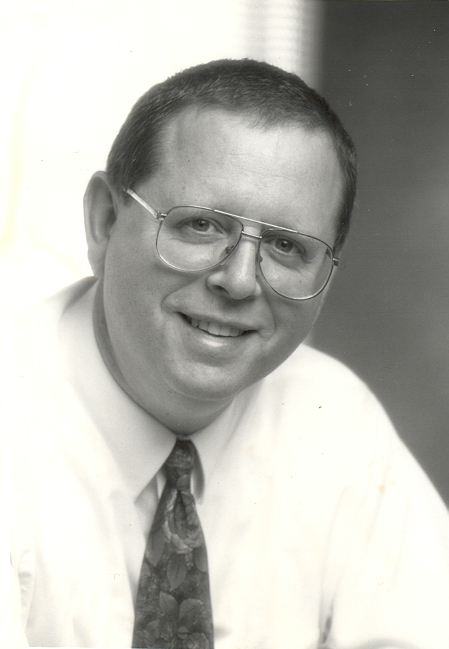
Clifford Mayes

A Jungian scholar, Mayes has produced the first book-length studies in English on the pedagogical applications of Jungian and post-Jungian psychology, which is based on the work of Carl Gustav Jung (1875–1961). Jungian psychology is also called analytical psychology. Mayes' work, situated in the humanities and depth psychology, is thought to offer an alternative to the social sciences model.

Mayes has developed what he has termed archetypal pedagogy. His work aims at promoting what he calls archetypal reflectivity in teachers; this is a means of encouraging teachers to examine and work with psychodynamic issues, images, and assumptions as those factors affect their pedagogical practices. Archetypal reflectivity, which draws not only upon Jungian psychology but transpersonal psychology generally, offers an avenue for teachers to probe the spiritual dimensions of teaching and learning in non-dogmatic terms. Mayes' archetypal pedagogy also examines salient issues in curriculum theory and instructional theory through a classically Jungian lens. Recently, his work has turned to what he calls "educative processes," which sees teaching and learning as inherent in all human relationships of any emotional, cognitive, or ethical moment (2020, 2019, 2017).

Two of Mayes' books, Inside Education: Depth Psychology in Teaching and Learning (2007) and The Archetypal Hero's Journey in Teaching and Learning: A Study in Jungian Pedagogy (2010), incorporate the psychoanalytic theories of Heinz Kohut (particularly Kohut's notion of the "selfobject") and the object relations theory of Ronald Fairbairn and D.W. Winnicott. Some of Mayes' work in curriculum theory, especially Seven Curricular Landscapes: An Approach to the Holistic Curriculum (2003) and Understanding the Whole Student: Holistic Multicultural Education (2007), is concerned with holistic education. The latter text is one of the first to extend the holistic approach into the area of multicultural education. A recent book, An Introduction to the Collected Works of C.G. Jung: Psyche as Spirit, appeared in 2017 through Rowman and Littlefield Press. Mayes has written on various topics in Jungian Sand Tray Therapy. His latest study, Archetype, Culture, and the Individual in Education: The Three Pedagogical Narratives, appeared in May, 2020 through Routledge Press. In it, Mayes offers a theory of the archetype that includes Ricoeur's categorization of time into personal/biographical time, cultural/world-historical time, and eternal/Yogic time.

Mayes has also edited a volume of recent research by new Jungian scholars on various applications of archetypal pedagogy to areas ranging from theology to therapy and from teacher education to vocational education. In press and slated for release though Rowman and Littlefield Press in early 2021, it is entitled New Visions and New Voices: Explorations in Archetypal Pedagogics. A second volume, which elaborates on the themes in that book with mostly the same group of contributors, is now in progress at Rowman and Littlefield and will appear in Summer 2022. Turning his attention to multicultural matters and peace studies, both from an archetypal perspective, Mayes is in the process of writing two new books. Intercultural Competence: A Mixed-Methods Case Study of Exchange Programs with Dinah D'Antoni and Compassion and Conflict Resolution: An Archetypal Approach with Jacquelyn Rinaldi are slated to appear late in Winter 2022. A practicing Roman Catholic, Mayes is also in process of writing an archetypal approach to the Gospel of St. John entitled Symbol as Sacrament: A Study in Archetypal Exegesis.

Mayes holds a doctorate in the cultural foundations of education from the University of Utah and a doctorate in psychology from Southern California University for Professional Studies.

== Selected works ==
=== Books ===
- Clifford Mayes (eds.); Rinaldi, Jacquelyn Ann (eds.), New Visions and New Voices: Extending the Principles of Archetypal Psychology to Include a Variety of Venues, Issues, and Projects (Vol. 2).. Rowman and Littlefield: 2023.
- Clifford Mayes, Archetype, Culture, and the Individual in Education: The Three Pedagogical Narratives. Routledge: 2020.
- Clifford Mayes, Developing the Whole Student: New Horizons for Holistic Education. Rowman Littlefield: 2019.
- Clifford Mayes, An Introduction to the Collected Works of C.G. Jung: Psyche as Spirit. Rowman and Littlefield: 2017.
- Clifford Mayes, Teaching and Learning for Wholeness: The Role of Archetypes in Educational Processes. Rowman and Littlefield: 2017.
- Clifford Mayes, Ramona Cutri, Neil Goslin, Fidel Montero, Understanding the Whole Student: Holistic Multicultural Education. 2nd Edition. Rowman Littlefield, 2015.
- Clifford Mayes and Ellen Williams, Nurturing the Whole Student. Rowman & Littlefield: 2013.
- Clifford Mayes, The Archetypal Hero's Journey in Teaching and Learning: A Study in Jungian Pedagogy. Atwood Publishing: 2010.
- Clifford Mayes, Inside Education: Depth Psychology in Teaching and Learning. Atwood Publishing: 2007.
- Clifford Mayes, Ramona Maile Cutri, Clint Rogers, Fidel Montero, Understanding the Whole Student: Holistic Multicultural Education. Rowman & Littlefield, 2007.
- Clifford Mayes, Jung and Education: Elements of an Archetypal Pedagogy. Rowman & Littlefield, 2005.
- Clifford Mayes, Teaching Mysteries: Foundations of Spiritual Pedagogy. University Press of America, 2004.
- Clifford Mayes, Seven Curricular Landscapes: An Approach to the Holistic Curriculum. University Press of America, 2003.

=== Articles ===
- Mayes, C. (2017). Art as Individuation, individuation as art. 46(2), 69-81. Quadrant: Journal of the C.G. Jung Society for Analytical Psychology.
- Mayes, C. (2017). Jung's view of the symbol and the sign in education. 59(2), 191-201. Psychological Perspectives: A Semi-Annual Journal of Jungian Thought.
- Mayes, C. (2010). Five dimensions of an existentially authentic pedagogy. 23(1). Encounter: Education for Meaning and Social Justice.
- Mayes, C. (2009). The psychoanalysts’ view of teaching and learning: 1922-2002. 41(4), 34-47. The Journal of Curriculum Studies.
- Hippolyte-Wright, D., and Mayes, C. (2007). Archetype, gender and culture: A Maori psychotherapist reflects on her academic career. In H. Vakalahi, S. Starks, and C. Hendricks (Eds.). Women of Color as Social Work Educators: strengths and survival. The Council on Social Work Education: Washington, D.C.
- Mayes, C., and Blackwell Mayes, P. (2006). Sandtray therapy with a 24-year-old woman in the residual phase of schizophrenia. The International Journal of Play Therapy, 15(1), 101-117.
- Mayes, C., and Blackwell Mayes, P. (2005). Jung, Mormonism, and the dialectics of exaltation. Psychological Perspectives: A Semiannual Journal of Jungian Thought. C.G. Institute of Los Angeles, 48, 84-107.
- Mayes, C. (2005). The teacher as shaman. Journal of Curriculum Studies, 37(3), 329-348.
- Mayes, C. (2005). Teaching and time: Foundations of a temporal pedagogy. Teaching Education Quarterly, 32(2), 143-160.
- Mayes, C. (2003). Alchemy and the teacher. The Teacher Education Quarterly, 30(3), 81-98.
- Mayes, C. (2002). The teacher as an archetype of spirit. Journal of Curriculum Studies, 34(6), 699-718.
- Mayes, C. (2001). A transpersonal developmental model for teacher reflectivity. Journal of Curriculum Studies, 33(4), 477-493.
- Mayes, C. (2000). Three perspectives on recent research in conceptual change theory. The Researcher: The Journal of the Rocky Mountain Division of the American Educational Research Association, 15(1), 57-70.
- Mayes, C. (1999). Reflecting on the archetypes of teaching. Teaching Education, 10(2), 3-16.
- Mayes, C. (1998). The use of contemplative practices in teacher education. Encounter: Education for Meaning and Social Justice, 11(3), 17-31.
