= Unus mundus =

Concept in Western thought

Unus mundus (Latin for "One world") is an underlying concept of Western philosophy, theology, and alchemy, of a primordial unified reality from which everything derives. The term can be traced back to medieval Scholasticism though the notion itself dates back at least as far as Plato's allegory of the cave.

The idea was popularized in the 20th century by the Swiss psychoanalyst Carl Gustav Jung, though the term can be traced back to scholastics such as Duns Scotus and was taken up again in the 16th century by Gerhard Dorn, a student of the famous alchemist Paracelsus.

Dorn's explanation is illuminating in that it affords us a deep insight into the alchemical mysterium coniunctionis. If this is nothing less than a restoration of the original state of the cosmos and the divine unconsciousness of the world, we can understand the extraordinary fascination emanating from this mystery. It is the Western equivalent of the fundamental principle of classic Chinese philosophy, namely the union of yang and yin in tao, and at the same time a premonition of that “tertium quid” which, on the basis of psychological experience on the one hand and Rhine’s experiments on the other, I have called “synchronicity”. If mandala symbolism is the psychological equivalent of the unus mundus, then synchronicity is its parapsychological equivalent.

— Carl Jung, Mysterium Coniunctionis

As Jungian analytical psychologist Marie-Louise von Franz pointed out, the term is quite different from that of the "oneness of reality" propounded by fellow Jungian Erich Neumann in 1952. von Franz claimed that Jung's conception rather denoted a sporadically activated "potential structure" in the "real inner and outer world.

== Jung and Pauli ==
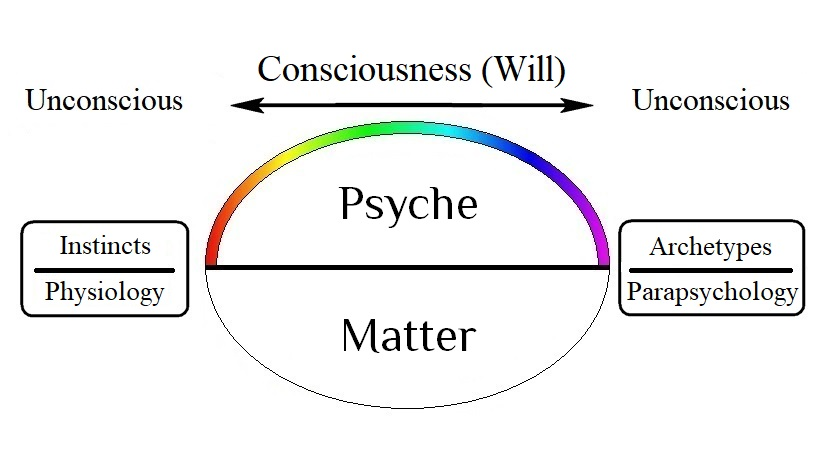
Model of unus mundus according to C. G. Jung.

Jung, in conjunction with the physicist Wolfgang Pauli, explored the possibility that his concepts of archetypes and synchronicity might be related to the unus mundus – the archetype being an expression of unus mundus; synchronicity, or "meaningful coincidence", being made possible by the fact that both the observer and connected phenomenon ultimately stem from the same source, the unus mundus.

Jung was careful, however, to stress the tentative and provisional nature of such explorations into a unitarian idea of reality.

== See also ==
- Anima mundi – Concept in metaphysics
- Bernardus Silvestris – 12th-century Platonist philosopher and poet
- Double-aspect theory – Theory in the philosophy of mind
- Eric Neumann – German writer, psychologist and philosopher
- Monopsychism – Medieval theory about human intellect
- Neutral monism – Class of metaphysical theories in the philosophy of mind
- Perennial philosophy – Idea that all religions share a single truth
- Sufi metaphysics – Part of Sufi Islamic philosophy
- Unconscious spirit – Supposed part of the human spirit that operates outside of conscious awareness
