= Psyche (psychology) =

Totality of the human mind, conscious and unconscious

The psyche /ˈsaɪki/ is currently used to describe the totality of the human mind, conscious and unconscious. Especially in older texts, the English word soul is sometimes used synonymously.

Psychology is the scientific or objective study of the psyche. The word has a long history of use in psychology and philosophy, dating back to ancient times, and represents one of the fundamental concepts for understanding human nature from a scientific point of view.

== Etymology ==
The basic meaning of the Greek word ψυχή (psūkhḗ) was 'life'. It is derived from the verb ψύχω (psūkhō). Derived meanings included 'spirit', 'soul', 'ghost', and ultimately 'self' in the sense of 'conscious personality' or 'psyche'.

== Ancient psychology ==
The idea of the psyche is central to the philosophy of Plato. Scholars translate the Platonic conceptualization of the term as "soul" in the sense that he believed that it is immortal. In his Phaedo, Plato has Socrates give four arguments for the immortality of the soul and life after death following the separation of the soul from the body. Plato's Socrates also states that after death the Psyche is better able to achieve wisdom and experience the Platonic forms since it is unhindered by the body.

The Greek philosopher Aristotle wrote an influential treatise on the psyche, called in Greek Περὶ Ψυχῆς (Peri Psyches), in Latin De Anima and in English On the Soul. In this work, he used the concept of the soul to explain certain functions. Since – for him – the soul is motion, it needs an explanatory principle for bodily motion. Aristotle's theory of the "three souls (psyches)" (vegetal, animal, and rational) would rule the field of psychology until the 19th century. Prior to Aristotle, a number of Greek writings used the term psyche in a less precise sense. In late antiquity, Galenic medicine developed the idea of three "spirits" (pneuma) corresponding to Aristotle's three souls. The pneuma psychikon corresponded to the rational soul. The other two pneuma were the pneuma physicon and the pneuma zoticon.

== Medieval psychology ==
The term psyche was Latinized to anima, which became one of the basic terms used in medieval psychology. Anima would have traditionally been rendered in English as "soul" but in modern usage the term "psyche" is preferable.

== Phenomenology ==
19th century psychologists such as Franz Brentano developed the concept of the psyche in a more subjective direction.

== Psychoanalysis ==
In psychoanalysis and other forms of depth psychology, the psyche refers to the forces in an individual that influence thought, behavior and personality.

=== Freudian school ===
Sigmund Freud, the father of psychoanalysis, believed that the psyche—he used the word Seele ('soul', but also 'psyche') throughout his writings—was composed of three components:

- The id, which represents the instinctual drives of an individual and remains largely unconscious. It does not respect the rules of society.
- The super-ego, which represents a person's conscience and their internalization of societal norms and morality.
- The ego, which is conscious and serves to integrate the drives of the id with the prohibitions of the super-ego. Freud believed this conflict to be at the heart of neurosis.

Freud's original terms for the three components of the psyche, in German, were das Es (lit. 'the It'), das Ich (lit. 'the I'), and das Über-Ich (lit. 'the Over-I' or 'the Upper-I'). According to Bruno Bettelheim, the Latin terms were proposed by Freud's English translators, probably to make them seem more 'medical' since, at the time, Latin was prevalent in medical terminology. Bettelheim deplores what he sees as pseudoscientific, Latin terms.

=== Jungian school ===
Carl Jung included in his definition the overlap and tension between the personal and the collective elements in man. He wrote much of his work in German and was careful to define what he meant by psyche and by soul (Seele):

I have been compelled, in my investigations into the structure of the unconscious, to make a conceptual distinction between soul and psyche. By psyche, I understand the totality of all psychic processes, conscious as well as unconscious. By soul, on the other hand, I understand a clearly demarcated functional complex that can best be described as a "personality".

The editors of his collected works noted that:

[In previous translations, and in this one as well, psyche – for which Jung in the German original uses either Psyche or Seele – has been used with reference to the totality of all psychic processes (cf. Jung, Psychological Types, Def. 48); i.e., it is a comprehensive term. Soul, on the other hand, as used in the technical terminology of analytical psychology, is more restricted in meaning and refers to a "function complex" or partial personality and never to the whole psyche. It is often applied specifically to "anima" and "animus"; e.g., in this connection it is used in the composite word "soul-image" (Seelenbild). This conception of the soul is more primitive than the Christian one with which the reader is likely to be more familiar. In its Christian context it refers to "the transcendental energy in man" and "the spiritual part of man considered in its moral aspect or in relation to God." –Editors.]

== Cognitive psychology ==
The word "mind" is preferred by cognitive scientists to "psyche". The mind is a set of cognitive faculties including consciousness, perception, thinking, judgement, language and memory. It is usually defined as the faculty of an entity's thoughts and consciousness. It holds the power of imagination, recognition, and appreciation, and is responsible for processing feelings and emotions, resulting in attitudes and actions.

== See also ==
- Consciousness
- Ego death
- Human spirit
- Inscape (visual art)
- Mind
- Motivation
- Nafs
- Persona
- Persona (psychology)
- Psychosis
- Reincarnation
- Stream of consciousness
- Tulpa
