= Individuation =

How a thing is identified as distinct from other things

The principle of individuation, or principium individuationis, describes the manner in which a thing is identified as distinct from other things.

The concept appears in numerous fields and is encountered in works of Leibniz, Carl Jung, Gunther Anders, Gilbert Simondon, Bernard Stiegler, Friedrich Nietzsche, Arthur Schopenhauer, David Bohm, Henri Bergson, Gilles Deleuze, and Manuel DeLanda.

== Usage ==
The word individuation occurs with different meanings and connotations in different fields.

=== In philosophy ===
Philosophically, "individuation" expresses the general idea of how a thing is identified as an individual thing that "is not something else". This includes how an individual person is held to be different from other elements in the world and how a person is distinct from other persons. By the seventeenth century, philosophers began to associate the question of individuation or what brings about individuality at any one time with the question of identity or what constitutes sameness at different points in time.

=== In Jungian psychology ===
In analytical psychology, individuation is the process by which the individual self develops out of an undifferentiated unconscious – seen as a developmental psychic process during which innate elements of personality, the components of the immature psyche, and the experiences of the person's life become, if the process is more or less successful, integrated over time into a well-functioning whole. Other psychoanalytic theorists describe it as the stage where an individual transcends group attachment and narcissistic self-absorption.

=== In the news industry ===
The news industry has begun using the term individuation to denote new printing and on-line technologies that permit mass customization of the contents of a newspaper, a magazine, a broadcast program, or a website so that its contents match each user's unique interests. This differs from the traditional mass-media practice of producing the same contents for all readers, viewers, listeners, or on-line users.

Communications theorist Marshall McLuhan alluded to this trend when discussing the future of printed books in an electronically interconnected world in the 1970s and 1980s.

=== In privacy and data protection law ===
From around 2016, coinciding with increased government regulation of the collection and handling of personal data, most notably the GDPR in European Union law, individuation has been used to describe the "singling out" of a person from a crowd – a threat to privacy, autonomy and dignity. Most data protection and privacy laws turn on the identifiability of an individual as the threshold criterion for when data subjects will need legal protection. However, privacy advocates argue that privacy harm can also arise from the ability to disambiguate or "single out" a person. Doing so allows the person, at an individual level, to be tracked, profiled, targeted, contacted, or subject to a decision or action which impacts them - even if their civil or legal identity is not known (or knowable).

In some jurisdictions the wording of the relevant statute already includes the concept of individuation, for example the California Consumer Privacy Act of 2018 (CCPA). In other jurisdictions, regulatory guidance has suggested that the concept of 'identification' includes individuation - i.e., the process by which an individual can be 'singled out' or distinguished from all other members of a group.

However, where privacy and data protection statutes use only the word "identification" or "identifiability", varying court decisions mean that there is not necessarily a consensus about whether the legal concept of identification already encompasses individuation or not.

Rapid advances in technologies including artificial intelligence, and video surveillance coupled with facial recognition systems have now altered the digital environment to such an extent that ‘not identifiable by name’ is no longer an effective proxy for ‘will suffer no privacy harm’. Many data protection laws may require redrafting to give adequate protection to privacy interests, by explicitly regulating individuation as well as identification of individual people.

=== In physics ===
Two quantum entangled particles cannot be understood independently. Two or more states in quantum superposition, e.g., as in Schrödinger's cat being simultaneously dead and alive, is mathematically not the same as assuming the cat is in an individual alive state with 50% probability. The Heisenberg's uncertainty principle says that complementary variables, such as position and momentum, cannot both be precisely known – in some sense, they are not individual variables. A natural criterion of individuality has been suggested.

== Arthur Schopenhauer ==
For Schopenhauer, the principium individuationis is constituted of time and space, being the ground of multiplicity. In his view, the mere difference in location suffices to make two systems different, with each of the two states having its own real physical state, independent of the state of the other.

This view influenced Albert Einstein. Schrödinger put the Schopenhaurian label on a folder of papers in his files “Collection of Thoughts on the physical Principium individuationis.”

== Carl Jung ==
According to Jungian psychology, individuation (German: Individuation) is a process of psychological integration. "In general, it is the process by which individual beings are formed and differentiated [from other human beings]; in particular, it is the development of the psychological individual as a being distinct from the general, collective psychology."

Individuation is a process of transformation whereby the personal and collective unconscious are brought into consciousness (e.g., by means of dreams, active imagination, or free association) to be assimilated into the whole personality. It is a completely natural process that is necessary for the integration of the psyche. Individuation has a holistic healing effect on the person, both mentally and physically.

In addition to Jung's theory of complexes, his theory of the individuation process forms conceptions of an unconscious filled with mythic images, a non-sexual libido, the general types of extraversion and introversion, the compensatory and prospective functions of dreams, and the synthetic and constructive approaches to fantasy formation and utilization.

"The symbols of the individuation process . . . mark its stages like milestones, prominent among them for Jungians being the shadow, the wise old man . . . and lastly the anima in man and the animus in woman." Thus, "There is often a movement from dealing with the persona at the start . . . to the ego at the second stage, to the shadow as the third stage, to the anima or animus, to the Self as the final stage. Some would interpose the Wise Old Man and the Wise Old Woman as spiritual archetypes coming before the final step of the Self."

"The most vital urge in every being, the urge to self-realize, is the motivating force behind the individuation process. With the internal compass of our very nature set toward self-realization, the thrust to become who and what we are derives its power from the instincts. On taking up the study of alchemy, Jung realized his long-held desire to find a body of work expressive of the psychological processes involved in the overarching process of individuation."

== Gilbert Simondon ==
In L'individuation psychique et collective, Gilbert Simondon developed a theory of individual and collective individuation in which the individual subject is considered as an effect of individuation rather than a cause. Thus, the individual atom is replaced by a never-ending ontological process of individuation.

Simondon also conceived of "pre-individual fields" which make individuation possible. Individuation is an ever-incomplete process, always leaving a "pre-individual" left over, which makes possible future individuations. Furthermore, individuation always creates both an individual subject and a collective subject, which individuate themselves concurrently. Like Maurice Merleau-Ponty, Simondon believed that the individuation of being cannot be grasped except by a correlated parallel and reciprocal individuation of knowledge.

== Bernard Stiegler ==
The philosophy of Bernard Stiegler draws upon and modifies the work of Gilbert Simondon on individuation and also upon similar ideas in Friedrich Nietzsche and Sigmund Freud. During a talk given at the Tate Modern art gallery in 2004, Stiegler summarized his understanding of individuation. The essential points are the following:

- The I, as a psychic individual, can only be thought in relationship to we, which is a collective individual. The I is constituted in adopting a collective tradition, which it inherits and in which a plurality of I ’s acknowledge each other’s existence.
- This inheritance is an adoption, in that I can very well, as the French grandson of a German immigrant, recognize myself in a past which was not the past of my ancestors but which I can make my own. This process of adoption is thus structurally factual.
- The I is essentially a process, not a state, and this process is an in-dividuation — it is a process of psychic individuation. It is the tendency to become one, that is, to become indivisible.
- This tendency never accomplishes itself because it runs into a counter-tendency with which it forms a metastable equilibrium. (It must be pointed out how closely this conception of the dynamic of individuation is to the Freudian theory of drives and to the thinking of Nietzsche and Empedocles.)
- The we is also such a process (the process of collective individuation). The individuation of the I is always inscribed in that of the we, whereas the individuation of the we takes place only through the individuations, polemical in nature, of the I ’s which constitute it.
- That which links the individuations of the I and the we is a pre-individual system possessing positive conditions of effectiveness that belong to what Stiegler calls retentional apparatuses. These retentional apparatuses arise from a technical system which is the condition of the encounter of the I and the we — the individuation of the I and the we is, in this respect, also the individuation of the technical system.
- The technical system is an apparatus which has a specific role wherein all objects are inserted — a technical object exists only insofar as it is disposed within such an apparatus with other technical objects (this is what Gilbert Simondon calls the technical group).
- The technical system is also that which founds the possibility of the constitution of retentional apparatuses, springing from the processes of grammatization growing out of the process of individuation of the technical system. And these retentional apparatuses are the basis for the dispositions between the individuation of the I and the individuation of the we in a single process of psychic, collective, and technical individuation composed of three branches, each branching out into process groups.
- This process of triple individuation is itself inscribed within a vital individuation which must be apprehended as:
  - the vital individuation of natural organs
  - the technological individuation of artificial organs
  - and the psycho-social individuation of organizations linking them together
- In the process of individuation, wherein knowledge as such emerges, there are individuations of mnemo-technological subsystems which overdetermine, qua specific organizations of what Stiegler calls tertiary retentions, the organization, transmission, and elaboration of knowledge stemming from the experience of the sensible.

== In collectivistic cultures ==
Research indicates that individuation is culturally mediated. In collectivistic societies, individuation leads to the development of a sense of self that psychologist Çiğdem Kağıtçıbaşı calls the "autonomous-relational" self. This form of individuation features emotional and psychological autonomy while maintaining intergenerational connectedness and interdependence rather than separation.

Furthermore, members of collectivistic societies are more likely to see expressions of individuation as either "taking the lead" or "seeking attention," the former being positively viewed and the latter more negatively.

== See also ==
- Akrasia
- Deindividuation
- Identical particles
- Identity formation
- Indiscernibles
- Individualistic culture
- Nekyia
- Positive disintegration
- Principle of individuation
- Rationalization (sociology)
- Self-actualization

== Bibliography ==
- Gilbert Simondon, Du mode d'existence des objets techniques (Méot, 1958; Paris: Aubier, 1989, second edition). (in French)
- Gilbert Simondon, On the Mode of Existence of Technical Objects, Part 1, link to PDF of 1980 translation.
- Gilbert Simondon, L'individu et sa genèse physico-biologique (l'individuation à la lumière des notions de forme et d'information) (Paris: PUF, 1964; J.Millon, coll. Krisis, 1995, second edition). (in French)
- Gilbert Simondon, The Individual and Its Physico-Biological Genesis, Part 1, Part 2, links to HTML files of unpublished 2007 translation.
- Gilbert Simondon, L'Individuation psychique et collective (1964; Paris: Aubier, 1989). (in French)
- Bernard Stiegler, Acting Out.
- Bernard Stiegler, Temps et individuation technique, psychique, et collective dans l’oeuvre de Simondon. (in French)
