= Persona (psychology) =

Social face an individual presents to the world

The persona, for Swiss psychiatrist Carl Jung, is the social face an individual presents to the world—"a kind of mask, designed on the one hand to make a definite impression upon others, and on the other to conceal the true nature of the individual."

== Jung's persona ==
=== Identification ===
According to Jung, the development of a viable social persona is a vital part of adapting to, and preparing for, adult life in the external social world. "A strong ego relates to the outside world through a flexible persona; identifications with a specific persona (doctor, scholar, artist, etc.) inhibits psychological development." For Jung, "the danger is that [people] become identical with their personas—the professor with his textbook, the tenor with his voice." The result could be "the shallow, brittle, conformist kind of personality which is 'all persona', with its excessive concern for 'what people think'"—an unreflecting state of mind "in which people are utterly unconscious of any distinction between themselves and the world in which they live. They have little or no concept of themselves as beings distinct from what society expects of them." The stage was set thereby for what Jung termed enantiodromia—the emergence of the repressed individuality from beneath the persona later in life: "the individual will either be completely smothered under an empty persona or an enantiodromia into the buried opposites will occur."

=== Disintegration ===
"The breakdown of the persona constitutes the typically Jungian moment both in therapy and in development"—the "moment" when "that excessive commitment to collective ideals masking deeper individuality—the persona—breaks down... disintegrates." Given Jung's view that "the persona is a semblance... the dissolution of the persona is therefore absolutely necessary for individuation." Nevertheless, the persona's disintegration may lead to a state of chaos in the individual: "one result of the dissolution of the persona is the release of fantasy... disorientation." As the individuation process gets under way, "the situation has thrown off the conventional husk and developed into a stark encounter with reality, with no false veils or adornments of any kind."

=== Negative restoration ===
One possible reaction to the resulting experience of archetypal chaos was what Jung called "the regressive restoration of the persona," whereby the protagonist "laboriously tries to patch up his social reputation within the confines of a much more limited personality... pretending that he is as he was before the crucial experience." Similarly in treatment there can be "the persona-restoring phase, which is an effort to maintain superficiality;" or even a longer phase designed not to promote individuation but to bring about what Jung caricatured as "the negative restoration of the persona"—that is to say, a reversion to the status quo.

=== Absence ===
The alternative is to endure living with the absence of the persona—and for Jung "the man with no persona... is blind to the reality of the world, which for him has merely the value of an amusing or fantastic playground." Inevitably, the result of "the streaming in of the unconscious into the conscious realm, simultaneously with the dissolution of the 'persona' and the reduction of the directive force of consciousness, is a state of disturbed psychic equilibrium." Those trapped at such a stage remain "blind to the world, hopeless dreamers... spectral Cassandras dreaded for their tactlessness, eternally misunderstood."

=== Restoration ===
Restoration, the aim of individuation, "is not only achieved by work on the inside figures but also, as conditio sine qua non, by a readaptation in outer life"—including the recreation of a new and more viable persona. To "develop a stronger persona... might feel inauthentic, like learning to 'play a role'... but if one cannot perform a social role then one will suffer." One goal for individuation is for people to "develop a more realistic, flexible persona that helps them navigate in society but does not collide with nor hide their true self." Eventually, "in the best case, the persona is appropriate and tasteful, a true reflection of our inner individuality and our outward sense of self."

== Later developments ==
The persona has become one of the most widely adopted aspects of Jungian terminology, passing into almost common vocabulary: "a mask or shield which the person places between himself and the people around him, called by some psychiatrists the persona." For Eric Berne, "the persona is formed during the years from six to twelve, when most children first go out on their own... to avoid unwanted entanglements or promote wanted ones." He was interested in "the relationship between ego states and the Jungian persona," and considered that "as an ad hoc attitude, persona is differentiated also from the more autonomous identity of Erik Erikson." Perhaps more contentiously, in terms of life scripts, he distinguished "the Archetypes (corresponding to the magic figures in a script) and the Persona (which is the style the script is played in)."

Post-Jungians would loosely call the persona "the social archetype of the conformity archetype," though Jung always distinguished the persona as an external function from those images of the unconscious he called archetypes. Thus, whereas Jung recommended conversing with archetypes as a therapeutic technique he himself had employed—"For decades I always turned to the anima when I felt my emotional behavior was disturbed, and I would speak with the anima about the images she communicated to me"—he stressed that "It would indeed be the height of absurdity if a man tried to have a conversation with his persona, which he recognized merely as a psychological means of relationship."

== See also ==
- Akrasia
- Bad faith (existentialism)
- Masking (behavior)
- Persona (1966 film)
- Persona (franchise)
- True self and false self
