= Index of psychology articles =

Psychology is the scientific study of the mind and behavior. Its subject matter includes the behavior of humans and nonhumans, both conscious and unconscious phenomena, and mental processes such as thoughts, feelings, and motives. Psychology is an academic discipline of broad scope, crossing the boundaries between the natural and social sciences.

Articles related to psychology (excluding psychologists – see list of psychologists) include:

== 0–9 ==
- 16 Personality Factors

== A ==
- Abnormal psychology
- Abreaction
- Absexual
- Abuse
- Acceptance and commitment therapy
- Acrophobia
- Acting out
- Action research
- Active intellect
- Active learning
- Activity theory
- Actor-observer bias
- Adaptation
- Adaptive behavior
- Addiction
- Adjustment disorder
- Adolescence
- Adolescent psychology
- Advanced Placement Psychology
- Affect
- Affect display
- Affectional bond
- Affectional orientation
- Affective forecasting
- Affective science
- Affirming the consequent
- Afterburn
- Age regression
- Ageing
- Aggression
- Agoraphobia
- Agraphia
- AIDS dementia complex
- Akinesia
- Alexithymia
- Algophobia
- Allophilia
- Alogia
- Alter ego
- Altered state of consciousness
- Altruism
- Alzheimer's disease
- Ambivalence
- American Psychological Association
- The American Psychologist
- Amnesia
- Anal retentive
- Anal stage
- Analytical psychology
- Anamnesis
- Anchoring
- Anger
- Anhedonia
- Anima and animus
- Animal-assisted therapy
- Animal cognition
- Animal hoarding
- Anomic aphasia
- Anomie
- Anorexia nervosa
- Anorgasmia
- A-not-B error
- Anterograde amnesia
- Anticathexis
- Anticipation (emotion)
- Antidepressant
- Antilocution
- Antipathy
- Antipsychotic
- Anti-social behavior
- Anxiety disorder
- Anxiety
- Anxiogenic
- Apathy
- Aphanisis
- Aphasia
- Apoplexy
- Apperception
- Applied behavior analysis
- Applied psychology
- Approach-avoidance conflict
- Aquaphobia
- Archetypal psychology
- Archetype
- Arousal
- Artistic inspiration
- Artificial demand
- Artisan temperament
- Asian psychology
- Asperger syndrome
- Assertiveness
- Association
- Astraphobia
- Attachment disorder
- Attachment theory
- Attention seeking
- Attention span
- Attention
- Attention-deficit hyperactivity disorder
- Attitude
- Attribution
- Attribution theory
- Attributional bias
- Atypical depression
- Audience effect
- Auditory processing disorder
- Aura in migraines and epilepsy
- Australasian Society for Experimental Psychology
- Australian Psychological Society
- Autassassinophilia
- Authoritarian personality
- Authority
- Autism Diagnostic Observation Schedule
- Autism spectrum
- Autism
- Autoassociative memory
- Autodidacticism
- Automatic behavior
- Availability heuristic
- Aversion therapy
- Aversives
- Avoidant personality disorder
- Avolition
- Awareness

== B ==
- Backward inhibition
- Baragnosis
- Barnes Akathisia Scale
- Barnes maze
- Beck's cognitive triad
- Behavior
- Behavior modification
- Behavior modification facility
- Behavior therapy
- Behavioral activation
- Behavioral communication
- Behavioral despair test
- Behavioral economics
- Behavioral engineering
- Behavioral genetics
- Behavioral medicine
- Behavioral neurology
- Behavioral neuroscience
- Behavioral sciences
- Behavioral theories of depression
- Behaviorism
- Belief
- Belongingness
- Beyond the Pleasure Principle
- Bibliomania
- Bicameral mentality
- Bidirectional associative memory
- Binge drinking
- Binge eating
- Biodata
- Bioenergetic analysis
- Biofeedback
- Biological psychology
- Bipolar disorder
- Bipolar I disorder
- Bipolar II disorder
- Blame
- Block design test
- Blood-injection-injury type phobia
- Blunted affect
- Boanthropy
- Body dysmorphic disorder
- Body image
- Body language
- Body psychotherapy
- Boldness
- Borderline intellectual functioning
- Borderline personality disorder
- Borromean clinic
- Bouma
- Bradykinesia
- Brainstorming
- Brainwashing
- Breathwork
- Brief psychotherapy
- Brief reactive psychosis
- British Journal of Social Psychology
- British Psychological Society
- Bulimia nervosa
- Bullying
- Burn Syndrome
- Burnout
- Bystander effect

== C ==
- California Psychological Inventory
- California School of Professional Psychology
- Canadian Psychological Association
- Cannon–Bard theory
- Care perspective
- Carnism
- Cassandra (metaphor)
- Castration anxiety
- Catalepsy
- Catastrophization
- Catatonia
- Catatonic schizophrenia
- Catharsis
- Cathexis
- Center for Evolutionary Psychology
- Centration
- Chaining
- Character orientation
- Character structure
- Charisma
- Cheating
- Chemical imbalance
- Child (archetype)
- Child abuse
- Child and Adolescent Mental Health Services
- Child development
- Child directed speech
- Child sexual abuse
- Childhood disintegrative disorder
- Chinese Classification of Mental Disorders
- Chronophilia
- Chunking
- Cibophobia
- Cinderella complex
- Cinderella effect
- Circadian rhythm
- Circadian rhythm sleep disorder
- Circumstantiality
- Clanging
- Classical Adlerian psychology
- Classical Adlerian psychotherapy
- Classical conditioning
- Claustrophobia
- Clinical psychology
- Clique
- Closure
- Codependency
- Cognition
- Cognitive appraisal
- Cognitive behavioral therapy
- Cognitive bias
- Cognitive development
- Cognitive dimensions of notations
- Cognitive disorder
- Cognitive dissonance
- Cognitive distortion
- Cognitive elite
- Cognitive evaluation theory
- Cognitive interventions
- Cognitive load
- Cognitive map
- Cognitive neuropsychology
- Cognitive psychology
- Cognitive restructuring
- Cognitive revolution
- Cognitive science
- Cognitive shift
- Cognitive slippage
- Cognitive space
- Cognitive specialization
- Cognitive style
- Cognitive test
- Cognitive therapy
- Cognitivism
- Cohort effect
- Collective consciousness
- Collective identity
- Collective intelligence
- Collective unconscious
- Color agnosia
- Color psychology
- Combat stress reaction
- Communication disorder
- Communication sciences
- Community mental health service
- Community psychology
- Comorbidity
- Comparative psychology
- Compensation
- Compersion
- Complex
- Complex post-traumatic stress disorder
- Compliance
- Compulsive behavior
- Computational theory of mind
- Conceptual blending
- Concrete operational stage
- Concurrent validity
- Conditioning, operant
- Conduct disorder
- Confabulation
- Confidence
- Confession
- Confirmation bias
- Conflict resolution
- Conformity
- Congenital disorder
- Conscientiousness
- Consciousness
- Consistency (negotiation)
- Conservation
- Contact hypothesis
- Content validity
- Continuous reinforcement
- Control freak
- Control theory
- Convergent thinking
- Conversion disorder
- Coordination disorder, developmental
- Cognitive reframing
- Coping
- Coping skill
- Coprophilia
- Cotard delusion
- Coulrophobia
- Counseling psychology
- Countersignaling
- Creative problem solving
- Creativity
- Criminal psychology
- Critical period
- Critical psychology
- Critical thinking
- Criticism
- Cross-sectional study
- Crowd manipulation
- Crowd psychology
- Cruelty to animals
- Cryptomnesia
- Cue-dependent forgetting
- Cultivation theory
- Cultural identity
- Cultural psychology
- Culture shock
- Curiosity
- Cyberpsychology
- Cyclopean image
- Cyclothymia

== D ==
- Da Costa's syndrome
- Daydream
- Dead inside
- Death drive
- Decay theory
- Deception
- Decision analysis
- Decision theory
- Declarative learning
- Declarative memory
- Defence mechanism
- Deindividuation
- Deinstitutionalisation
- Déjà vu
- Delay reduction hypothesis
- Delayed sleep phase syndrome
- Delirium
- Delusion
- Delusion and Dream in Jensen's Gradiva
- Delusional disorder
- Demand (psychoanalysis)
- Demand characteristics
- Dementia
- Dementia praecox
- Denial
- Dental fear
- Dependency need
- Dependent personality disorder
- Depersonalization
- Depersonalization-derealization disorder
- Depressive Disorder Not Otherwise Specified
- Depressive personality disorder
- Depressive position
- Depressive realism
- Depth psychology
- Derealization
- Dereistic thinking
- Dermatillomania
- Desensitization
- Design thinking
- Designated patient
- Desire (psychoanalysis)
- Destrudo
- Detachment, emotional
- Detachment (philosophy)
- Detection theory
- Deterrence
- Devaluation
- Developmental coordination disorder
- Developmental disorder
- Developmental lines
- Developmental profile
- Developmental psychology
- Developmental stage theories
- Diagnostic and Statistical Manual of Mental Disorders
- Dialectical behavior therapy
- Dialogical self
- Diathesis–stress model
- Dichotic listening
- Differential psychology
- Diogenes syndrome
- Dipsomania
- Disappointment
- Discrimination
- Discursive psychology
- Disinhibited attachment disorder
- Disinhibition
- Disintegrative disorder
- Disorder of written expression
- Disorganized schizophrenia
- Displacement
- Dispositionist
- Dissocial personality disorder
- Dissociation
- Dissociative amnesia
- Dissociative disorder
- Dissociative fugue
- Dissociative identity disorder
- Distancing language
- Distressed personality type
- Distributed cognition
- Distrust
- Divergent thinking
- Doctor of Psychology
- Dominance and submission
- Door-in-the-face technique
- Double bind
- Double depression
- Dream
- Dream dictionary
- Dream interpretation
- Dream journal
- Dream transference
- Drive Theory
- DSM-5
- Dual diagnosis
- Dual-coding theory
- Dump job
- Dynamicism
- Dysarthria
- Dyscalculia
- Dysfunctional family
- Dysgraphia
- Dyskinesia
- Dyslexia
- Dyspareunia
- Dysphonia
- Dysphoria
- Dyssomnia
- Dysthymia

== E ==
- Early childhood education
- Early intervention in psychosis
- Eating disorder
- Echolalia
- Echopraxia
- Ecological psychology
- Ecopsychology
- Educational psychology
- Edwards Personal Preference Schedule
- Ego ideal
- Ego psychology
- Ego reduction
- Ego
- Egocentric predicament
- Egocentrism
- Ego-dystonic sexual orientation
- Egodystonic
- Egomania
- Egosyntonic
- Elective mutism
- Electra complex
- Electroencephalography
- Elevation (emotion)
- EMDR Institute
- Emetophobia
- EmojiGrid
- Emotion and memory
- Emotion classification
- Emotion recognition in conversation
- Emotion recognition
- Emotion work
- Emotion
- Emotional abuse
- Emotional affair
- Emotional affect
- Emotional age
- Emotional aperture
- Emotional approach coping
- Emotional argument
- Emotional baggage
- Emotional bias
- Emotional blackmail
- Emotional blunting
- Emotional conflict
- Emotional contagion
- Emotional detachment
- Emotional dysregulation
- Emotional expression
- Emotional exhaustion
- Emotional insecurity
- Emotional intelligence
- Emotional isolation
- Emotional labor
- Emotional reasoning
- Emotions in the workplace
- Empathic distress
- Empathy gap
- Empathy
- Emptiness
- Empty-chair technique
- Encoding (memory)
- Encopresis
- Encounter group
- Endogenous depression
- Endogeny
- Energy psychology
- Engram
- Entitlement
- Entomophobia
- Enuresis
- Environmental psychology
- Envy
- Epilepsy aura
- Epiphany (feeling)
- Equity theory
- Ergophobia
- Erikson's stages of psychosocial development
- Erotomania
- Erotophobia
- Erythrophobia
- Ethics and evolutionary psychology
- Ethics of eating meat
- Euphoria
- European Association for Psychotherapy
- Evaluation
- Evolutionary developmental psychology
- Evolutionary educational psychology
- Evolutionary Principle
- Evolutionary psychology
- Exaggeration
- Exclusivism
- Executive functions
- Exhibitionism
- Existential therapy
- Exogeny
- Exorcism
- Experimental group
- Experimental method
- Experimental neurosis
- Experimental Psychology Society
- Experimental psychology
- Experimenter's bias
- Explanation
- Explicit memory
- Exposure and response prevention
- Expressed emotion
- Expressive language disorder
- External validity
- Extraversion and introversion
- Eysenck Personality Questionnaire

== F ==
- F-scale
- Face-ism
- Face perception
- Face validity
- Facial expression
- Factitious disorder
- Factorial ANOVA
- Faculty psychology
- False awakening
- Family therapy
- Fanaticism
- Fantasy
- Fast mapping
- Fear
- Fear of flying
- Feature integration theory
- Feeble-minded
- Feedback loop
- Feelings
- Female sexual arousal disorder
- Femininity
- Feral child
- Fetal alcohol syndrome
- The Fifth Discipline
- Fight-or-flight response
- first principle
- Fixation
- Flashback
- Flashbulb memory
- Flattery
- Flirting
- Flooding
- Flow
- Flowerpot technique
- Fluid and crystallized intelligence
- Folie à deux
- Folk psychology
- Fooled by Randomness
- Foolishness
- Foot-in-the-door technique
- Forensic psychology
- Forgiveness
- Foresight (psychology)
- Formal operational stage
- Formication
- Formicophilia
- Foundations of Cyclopean Perception
- Four discourses
- Four stages of competence
- Fragile X syndrome
- Free association
- Free-floating anxiety
- Free-running sleep
- Frigidity
- Frustration
- Fugue
- Functional autonomy
- Functional disorder
- Functional psychology
- Functional symptom
- Fundamental attribution error
- Fundamental Interpersonal Relations Orientation

== G ==
- g factor
- Ganser syndrome
- Gaze
- Gender identity
- Gender identity disorder
- Gender narcissism
- Gender role
- General adaptation syndrome
- Generalized anxiety disorder
- Genetic predisposition
- Genie (feral child)
- Genital stage
- Genophobia
- Geon
- Germaphobia
- Geschwind–Galaburda hypothesis
- Gestalt psychology
- Gestalt theoretical psychotherapy
- Gestalt therapy
- Glasser's choice theory
- Global aphasia
- Glossophobia
- Gnosology
- God helmet
- Grand mal epilepsy
- Grandiose delusions
- Grandiosity
- Gratification
- Gratitude
- Graz School
- Greed
- Gregariousness
- Grief
- Grounding (punishment)
- Group attribution error
- Group dynamics
- Group polarization
- Group psychotherapy
- Group-serving bias
- Group synergy
- Groupthink
- Guilt
- Guilty but mentally ill
- Gustation
- Gymnophobia
- Gyrus

== H ==
- Habit
- Habituation
- Hair pulling
- Hakomi
- Hallucination
- Hallucinosis
- Halo effect
- Hamilton Depression Rating Scale
- Hawthorne effect
- Healing temple
- Health and Human Services
- Health psychology
- Hedonism
- Heffter Research Institute
- Heliophobia
- Hemophobia
- Herpetophobia
- Hidden observer
- Hierarchy of needs
- High IQ society
- Highway hypnosis
- History of psychology
- Histrionic personality disorder
- Holland Codes
- Homophobia
- Homosexual panic
- Homosexuality
- Hopfield net
- Host
- Hostility
- How the Mind Works
- Hubris
- Human behavior
- Human bonding
- Human computer interaction
- Human Givens
- Human modelling
- Humanistic psychology
- Humiliation
- Hwa-Byung
- Hydrophobia
- Hydrotherapy
- Hyperactivity
- Hyperactivity disorder
- Hypergraphia
- Hypergyny
- Hyperkinetic disorder
- Hypermasculinity
- Hyperreflexia
- Hypersomnia
- Hypertension
- Hypertensive crisis
- Hyperthymesia
- Hyperventilation
- Hypesthesia
- Hypnopompic
- Hypnosis
- Hypnotherapy
- Hypnotic
- Hypoactive sexual desire disorder
- Hypochondriasis
- Hypomania
- Hypomanic episode
- Hysterical neurosis
- Hysteria

== I ==
- Iatrogenic illness
- ICD-9
- ICD-10
- ICD-11
- Id, ego, and super-ego
- Idea
- Idealization and devaluation
- Ideas bank
- Ideas of reference
- Ideasthesia
- Ideation
- Identification
- Identity crisis
- Ideomotor effect
- Idiot savant
- Idiothetic
- Image schema
- Imagination
- Imitation
- Immediate memory
- Implementation intention
- Impotence
- Impregnation fetish
- Imprinting
- Impulse
- Impulse control disorder
- Incentive salience
- Incest
- Incest taboo
- Incompetent to stand trial
- Indirect realism
- Individual differences psychology
- Individual psychology
- Individuation
- Inductive reasoning
- Industrial and organizational psychology
- Infantilism, paraphilic
- Infantophilia
- Inference
- Inferiority complex
- Informed consent
- Infradian rhythm
- Inheritance of intelligence
- Inhibited male orgasm
- Inhibited orgasm
- Social inhibition
- Innate
- Innate ideas
- Inner child
- Innocence
- Inquiry
- Insanity
- Insanity defense
- Insight
- Insomnia
- Instinct
- Institute of Transpersonal Psychology
- Institutionalization
- Instrumental conditioning
- Insult
- Intellectual disability
- Integral psychology
- Integral theory
- Integrative complexity
- Intellectualization
- Intelligence
- Intelligence amplification
- Intelligence quotient
- Intelligence test
- Interaction effects
- Interference theory
- Intergender
- Intermittent explosive disorder
- Internal capsule
- Internal consistency
- Internal locus of control
- Internalized oppression
- International Association of Analytical Psychologists
- International Classification of Diseases
- International Society for Comparative Psychology
- Interpersonal and social rhythm therapy
- Interpersonal psychoanalysis
- Interpersonal psychotherapy
- Interpersonal skills
- Inter-rater reliability
- Interstimulus interval
- Intertwingularity
- Intervention (counseling)
- Interview
- Intimacy
- Intimate relationship
- Intravenous
- Intrinsic motivation
- Introjection
- Intromission theory
- Introspection
- Introversion
- Intuition
- Involuntary commitment
- Involutional melancholia
- IQ
- Ironic process theory
- Irrational anger
- Irresistible impulse
- Isolation

== J ==
- Jealousy
- Jenkins Activity Survey
- Johari window
- Joint Commission on Accreditation of Healthcare Organizations
- Journal of Applied Developmental Psychology
- Journal of Consulting and Clinical Psychology
- Journal of Health Psychology
- Journal of Occupational Health Psychology
- Journal of Psychohistory
- Judgement
- Jungian psychology
- Just-world phenomenon

== K ==
- Keirsey Temperament Sorter
- Kharkov School of Psychology
- Kinesics
- Kinesthesis
- Kleine–Levin syndrome
- Kleptomania
- Klinefelter syndrome
- Klismaphilia
- Klüver–Bucy syndrome
- Kübler-Ross model
- Knowledge management
- Kohlberg's stages of moral development

== L ==
- L-dopa
- Labeling theory
- Labile
- Lability
- Laboratory for Automation Psychology
- Laceration
- Lacrimation
- Lacunar amnesia
- Landolt ring
- Language acquisition device
- Language disorder
- Lapsus
- Lapsus linguae
- Large Group Awareness Training
- Large-group communication
- Latah
- Child sexuality#Middle childhood
- Latency period
- Latency stage
- Latent learning
- Lateral thinking
- Law of effect
- Leadership
- Learned helplessness
- Learning
- Learning curve
- Learning disabilities
- Learning disability
- Learning disorders
- Learning organization
- Learning theory (education)
- Legal psychology
- Lethologica
- Levels-of-processing effect
- Liberation psychology
- Libido
- Lie
- Lifespring
- Lifetime prevalence
- Light therapy
- Ligyrophobia
- List of cognitive biases
- List of credentials in psychology
- List of emotions
- List of psychologists
- List of psychology disciplines
- List of psychology journals
- List of psychology organizations
- List of psychological research methods
- List of scientific journals in psychology
- Lüscher color test
- Locus of control
- Loevinger's stages of ego development
- Logorrhea
- Logotherapy
- Loner
- Longitudinal study
- Looking glass self
- Loose associations
- Loss aversion
- Lovaas technique
- Love styles
- Lovemap
- Low frustration tolerance
- Lucid dream

== M ==
- MacDonald triad
- Machiavellianism
- Madonna–whore complex
- Magical thinking
- Main effect
- Major depression
- Major depressive disorder
- Making excuses
- Maladaptive daydreaming
- Malignant narcissism
- Malingering
- Man and His Symbols
- Mania
- Manipulation
- Manic–depressive illness
- Manic episode
- Manipulation
- Marital therapy
- Marriage guidance
- Martyr complex
- Masculinity
- Masking (behavior)
- Maslow's hierarchy of needs
- Masochistic personality disorder
- Mass hysteria
- Maternal deprivation
- Mathematical psychology
- Mathematics disorder
- Maturation and environmentalism
- McLean Hospital
- Mean World Syndrome
- Measure of central tendency
- Medical model
- Medical psychology
- Melancholia
- Memory-prediction framework
- Memory and aging
- Memory augmentation
- Memory consolidation
- Memory effect
- Memory inhibition
- Memory suppression
- Mental age
- Mental block
- Mental calculation
- Mental confusion
- Mental disorder
- Mental function
- Mental health
- Mental health consumer
- Mental health disorders
- Mental illness
- Mental management
- Mental model
- Mental status
- Mental state
- Mental status examination
- Mentalism
- Mentally ill
- Mentoring
- Mesmerism
- Messiah complex
- Metabolism
- Metabolite
- Metacognition
- Metaknowledge
- Metapsychology
- Microexpression
- Mid-life crisis
- Middle age
- Migraine aura
- Milgram experiment
- Milieu therapy
- Mind's eye
- Mind–body dualism
- Mind–body problem
- Mind Dynamics
- Mind map
- Mindfulness
- Mindset
- Minimisation
- Minnesota Multiphasic Personality Inventory
- Mirror stage
- Mixed anxiety–depressive disorder
- Mixed state (psychiatry)
- MMPI-2
- Mnemonics
- Mnemonic link system
- Mnemonist
- Mob psychology
- Model (abstract)
- Model of hierarchical complexity
- Conceptual model
- Modelling
- Monomania
- Mocking
- Mood
- Mood disorder
- Mood swing
- Moral psychology
- Moral reasoning
- Moral treatment
- Morbid jealousy
- Moron
- Mortido
- Motion illusion
- Motivation
- Motor coordination
- Motor skills disorder
- Mozart Effect
- Movement context in handwriting
- Multidisciplinary Association for Psychedelic Studies
- Multi-infarct dementia
- Multilevel model
- Multilevel models
- Multisensory integration
- Multimodal therapy
- Multiple-complex Developmental Disorder
- Multiple personality disorder
- Human multitasking
- Multnomah Community Ability Scale
- Münchausen syndrome
- Münchausen syndrome by proxy
- Music psychology
- Mutism
- Myers–Briggs Type Indicator
- Mysophilia
- Mysophobia
- Mythomania

== N ==
- N-Affil
- N-Pow
- Napoleon complex
- Narcissism
- Narcissism of small differences
- Narcissistic parent
- Narcissistic personality disorder
- Narcissistic rage and narcissistic injury
- Narcosynthesis
- Narrative therapy
- Naturalistic observation
- Necrophobia
- Need
- Negative reinforcement
- Negative symptoms
- Negativistic personality disorder
- Neglect
- Neo-Freudian
- Neo-Piagetian theories of cognitive development
- Neophobia
- Neuro-linguistic programming
- Neurocognition
- Neurofeedback
- Neurological disorder
- Neuropsychological test
- Neuropsychology
- Neuroscience
- Neurosis
- Neurosyphilis
- Negotiation
- Neuroticism Extraversion Openness Personality Inventory
- Night owl
- Nightmare
- Nightmare disorder
- Noetic Psychology
- Nonparametric test
- Nonverbal communication
- Nonviolent self defense
- Norm (sociology)
- Norm-referenced test
- Nurturant parent model
- Nurture
- Nyctophobia
- Nymphophilia

== O ==
- Object permanence
- Objective test
- Observational learning
- Obsessive-compulsive disorder
- Obsessive–compulsive personality disorder
- Obsessive relational intrusion
- Occupational health psychology
- Occupational psychology
- Occupational psychosis
- Occupational therapy
- Octave illusion
- Oedipus complex
- One-upmanship
- Open relationship
- Operant behavior
- Operant conditioning
- Operations research
- Opponent-process theory
- Opportunism
- Oppositional defiant disorder
- Optimal distinctiveness theory
- Oral stage
- Ordinal numerical competence
- Organizational citizenship behavior
- Organizational communication
- Organizational psychology
- Orgone
- Orientation (mental)
- Ornithophobia
- Osmophobia
- Overjustification effect
- Overlearning

== P ==
- Pain and pleasure
- Pain disorder
- Pair by association
- Pairwise comparison
- Palilalia
- Panic attack
- Panic disorder
- Papert's principle
- Paradoxical intention
- Parallel play
- Paranoia
- Paranoid-schizoid position
- Paranoid disorder
- Paranoid personality disorder
- Paranoid schizophrenia
- Paraphilia
- Paraphrenia
- Parapsychology
- Paraskevidekatriaphobia
- Parasuicide
- Paresthesia
- Parosmia
- Passion (emotion)
- Passive–aggressive behavior
- Password psychology
- Pastoral counseling
- Pathogenic theory of schizophrenia
- Pathognomy
- Pathological gambling
- Pathological lying
- Patience
- PDD not otherwise specified
- Pedophile
- Pedophilia
- Penis envy
- People skills
- Perception
- Perceptual psychology
- Perfectionism
- Performance anxiety
- Performance psychology
- Persecution complex
- Persecutory delusions
- Person centered planning
- Person-centered therapy
- Personal boundaries
- Personal commitment
- Personal construct psychology
- Personal construct theory
- Personality alteration
- Personality Assessment Inventory
- Personality disorder
- Personality psychology
- Personality tests
- Personality trait
- Perspective (cognitive)
- Persuasion
- Pervasive developmental disorders
- Phagophobia
- Phallic stage
- Phantom rings
- Phenomenology
- Phenotype
- Phenotypic trait
- Philippine psychology
- Philomath
- Philosophy of mind
- Philosophy of psychology
- Phobia
- Phonological disorder
- Phonology
- Photopic vision
- Phrenology
- Physiological psychology
- Piaget's theory of cognitive development
- Pick's disease
- Picture thinking
- Pillow talk
- Pituitary gland
- Piquerism
- Placebo effect
- Planning
- Plateau phase
- Platykurtic
- Play therapy
- Pleasure principle
- Poker psychology
- Polarization
- Political psychology
- Popular psychology
- Positive Mental Attitude
- Positive psychology
- Positive reinforcement
- Post-cognitivist psychology
- Post-purchase rationalization
- Post-traumatic embitterment disorder
- Post-traumatic stress disorder
- Postcognitivism
- Postvention
- Poverty of speech
- Power
- Power Law of Practice
- Practical equine psychology
- Prairie madness
- Praise
- Pre- and perinatal psychology
- Preconscious
- Prediction
- Predictive validity
- Prejudice
- Premature ejaculation
- Premenstrual dysphoric disorder
- Preoperational stage
- Prescriptions regarding gender roles
- Presenile dementia
- Primacy effect
- Primal therapy
- The Principles of Psychology
- Privileged communication
- Proactive inhibition
- Proactivity
- Proactive interference
- Probability of error
- Probands
- Problem-based learning
- Problem finding
- Problem solving
- Process Oriented Psychology
- Process Psychology
- Procrastination
- Prodrome
- Professional practice of behavior analysis
- Program evaluation
- Programmed learning
- Psychiatrist
- Psychological projection
- Psychological stress
- Psychological trauma
- Projective identification
- Projective test
- Pronoia
- Pronoun reversal
- Properception
- Propinquity
- Proposition
- Propositional attitude
- Prosopagnosia
- Prospect theory
- Prospection
- Protoself
- Proxemics
- Prudence
- Pseudocertainty effect
- Pseudologia
- Psychiatric hospital
- Psychopathy
- Punitive psychiatry in the Soviet Union
- Psyche
- Psychedelic drug
- Psychedelic experience
- Psychedelic therapy
- Psychic driving
- Psychoacoustics
- Psychoactive
- Psychoactive drug
- Psychoanalysis
- Psychoanalyst
- Psychoanalytic feminism
- Psychoanalytic theory
- Psychoanalytic film theory
- Psychobiography
- Psychodrama
- Psychodynamic theory
- Psychodynamic therapy
- Psychodynamics
- Psychogenesis
- Psychogenic amnesia
- Psychogenic pain
- Psychogenic polydipsia
- Psychogram
- Psychohistory
- Psycholinguist
- Psycholinguistics
- Psychological abuse
- Psychological adaptation
- Psychological assessment
- Psychological dependency
- Psychological identity
- Psychological manipulation
- Psychological pain
- Psychological repression
- Psychological research methods
- Research methods
- Psychological resilience
- Psychological Review
- Psychological statistics
- Psychological testing
- Psychological tests
- Psychological types
- Psychology of combat
- Psychology of eating meat
- Psychology of learning
- Psychology of Monogamy
- Psychology of previous investment
- Psychology of programming
- Psychology of religion
- Psychology of reasoning
- Psychology Today
- Psychology, Philosophy and Physiology
- Psychometrics
- Psychomotor agitation
- Psychomotor retardation
- Psychonomics
- Psychoneuroimmunology
- Psychoorganic syndrome
- Psychopathology
- Psychopharmacology
- Psychophysics
- Psychophysiology
- Psychosexual stages
- Psychosis
- Psychosomatic disorders
- Psychotherapy
- Psychotic depression
- Psychotropic medication
- PsycINFO
- Puer Aeternus
- Punishment

== Q ==
- Quantitative psychological research
- Quantitative psychology
- Quantitative trait locus

== R ==
- Radical behaviorism
- Radical Psychology Network
- Radiophobia
- Rage
- Random assignment
- Rape trauma syndrome
- Rapport
- Rashomon effect
- Rational-emotive therapy
- Rational choice theory
- Rational emotive therapy
- Rationality
- Rationalization
- Re-evaluation Counseling
- Reachback
- Reactance
- Reaction formation
- Reactive attachment disorder
- Reactivity
- Reading
- Realistic conflict theory
- Relational aggression
- Relational disorder
- Reality distortion field
- Reality principle
- Reasoning
- Reciprocal liking
- Reciprocity
- Recklessness
- Recluse
- Recollection
- Recovery International
- Recurring dream
- Referent power
- Regression
- Regression analysis
- Regulatory Focus Theory
- Rehabilitation (neuropsychology)
- Rehabilitation counseling
- Reinforcement
- Reinforcer
- Rejection (emotion)
- Relational frame theory
- Relationship counseling
- Religious instinct
- Reminiscence
- Remorse
- Renfield's syndrome
- Repetition compulsion
- Representations
- Representativeness heuristic
- Repression
- Rescorla-Wagner model
- Resentment
- Residual schizophrenia
- Resistance
- Respondent conditioning
- Retroactive inhibition
- Retroactive interference
- Retrograde amnesia
- Retrospective memory
- Rethinking
- Reuptake
- Reversal theory
- Reverse learning
- Reverse psychology
- Rhetoric
- Righteous indignation
- Risky shift
- Ritualization
- Role-playing
- Role reversal
- Role theory
- Rorschach inkblot test
- Rosenthal effect
- Rotter Incomplete Sentence Blank
- Rousseau Institute

== S ==
- Sadistic personality disorder
- Sadomasochism
- Safety in numbers
- Sander illusion
- Sapience
- Scale (social sciences)
- Schadenfreude
- Schedules of reinforcement
- Schema
- Schizoaffective disorder
- Schizoid personality disorder
- Schizophrenia
- Schizophrenics Anonymous
- Schizophreniform disorder
- Schizotypal personality disorder
- Scholastic Aptitude Test
- School phobia
- School refusal
- Science and Consciousness Review
- Scientific control
- Seasonal affective disorder
- Secondary gain
- Security blanket
- Selective abstraction
- Selective distortion
- Self-actualization
- Self-awareness
- Self-concept
- Self-consciousness
- Self-criticism
- Self-deception
- Self-defeating personality disorder
- Self-determination theory
- Self-disclosure
- Self-efficacy
- Self-esteem
- Self-esteem functions
- Self-help
- Self-injury
- Self-knowledge
- Self-loathing
- Self-monitoring
- Self-parenting
- Self-perception theory
- Self-pity
- Self-punishment
- Self-realization
- Self-regulated learning
- Self
- Self (Jung)
- Self actualization
- Self control
- Self efficacy
- Self-esteem
- Self handicapping
- Self propaganda
- Self psychology
- Self serving bias
- Selfishness
- Semantic dementia
- Semantic dyslexia
- Semantic memory
- Semantics
- Senile dementia
- Senile plaques
- Sensation
- Sense of time
- Sensitivity
- Sensory adaptation
- Sensory gating
- Sensory memory
- Sensory neuroscience
- Sensory preconditioning
- Sensory threshold
- Sentience
- Separation anxiety disorder
- Serial position effect
- Serial sevens
- Sex-reassignment surgery
- Sexual arousal disorders
- Sexual arousal
- Sexual aversion disorder
- Sexual desire
- Sexual deviation
- Sexual disorders
- Sexual dysfunction
- Sexual fetishism
- Sexual masochism
- Sexual orientation
- Sexual response cycle
- Sexual sadism
- Human sexuality
- Shadow (Jung)
- Shame
- Shaping
- Shell shock
- Shock value
- Short term memory
- Shyness
- Sibling
- Siege mentality
- Sigmund Freud Archives
- Silva Method
- Similarity
- Simon effect
- Simplicity theory
- Simulated consciousness
- Simulated pregnancy
- Simulation heuristic
- Sitophobia
- Situational awareness
- Six Thinking Hats
- Size-weight illusion
- Skinner box
- Sleep-learning
- Sluggish cognitive tempo
- Sluggishly progressing schizophrenia
- Smart mob
- SMART criteria
- Social anxiety
- Social anxiety disorder
- Social cognition
- Social desirability
- Social disruption
- Social distance
- Social distance scale
- Social facilitation
- Social group
- Social influence
- Social inhibition
- Social interaction
- Social learning theory
- Social loafing
- Social neuroscience
- Social norm
- Social proof
- Social psychology (psychology)
- Social psychology (sociology)
- Social rejection
- Social rhythm therapy
- Social role
- Social skills
- Social statistics
- Social status
- Social stigma
- Social support
- Socialization
- Society of Mind theory
- Socioeconomic status
- Sociometry
- Socionics
- Sociosexual orientation
- Sodomy
- Solitary confinement
- Soma
- Somatization disorder
- Somatoform disorder
- Somatotherapy
- Somatotype and constitutional psychology
- Spatial memory
- Spatial-temporal reasoning
- Speaker recognition
- Speciesism
- Specific phobia
- Specific social phobia
- Speech act
- Speech perception
- Speed reading
- Spiral dynamics
- Splitting
- Spontaneous recovery
- Sport psychology
- Stage fright
- Stage theory
- Stages of faith development
- Stanford–Binet Intelligence Scales
- State-dependent learning
- State-dependent memory
- Steppingstone theory
- Stereotype
- Stereotypic movement disorder
- Stimming
- Stimulus generalization
- Stir crazy (condition)
- Stockholm syndrome
- Storage (memory)
- Strategic planning
- Stream of consciousness
- Stress
- Stress management
- Stressor
- Structural communication
- Structural ritualization theory
- Structuralism
- Structure-agency debate
- Structured interview
- Study Skills
- Stupidity
- Subjective reality
- Sublimation
- Subliminal advertising
- Subliminal perception
- Submission
- Substance-related disorder
- Substance abuse
- Substance Abuse and Mental Health Services Administration
- Substance dependence
- Substance intoxication
- Substance-related disorder
- Subvocalization
- Subconscious
- Suffering
- Suicidal ideation
- Suicide
- Suicide treatment
- Suicide watch
- Suicidology
- Superego
- Superficial charm
- Superiority complex
- Superman complex
- Superordinate goals
- Surprise
- Swept-plane display
- Sycophancy
- Syllogism
- Sylvia Plath effect
- Symbolic violence
- Sympathy
- Sympathetic nervous system
- Synesthesia
- Synectics
- Systematic desensitization
- Systems psychology
- Systems thinking

== T ==
- T-groups
- T test
- Taboo
- Tactile
- Taijin kyofusho
- Talking cure
- Taphophobia
- Target fixation
- Taunting
- Thematic Apperception Test
- Technophobia
- Telepathy
- Temperament
- Terdekaphobia
- Ternus illusion
- Test (education)
- Test-retest reliability
- Thalamus
- The Blank Slate
- The g Factor: General Intelligence and Its Implications
- The g Factor: The Science of Mental Ability
- The Imaginary
- The Real
- The Retreat
- The Social Animal
- The Symbolic
- The Third Wave
- The Wisdom of Crowds
- Thematic Apperception Test
- Theophylline
- Theoretical psychology
- Theory of cognitive development
- Theory of constraints
- Theory of Deadly Initials
- Theory of mind
- Theory of multiple intelligences
- Therapeutic community
- Thinking
- Time boxing
- Thinking processes (theory of constraints)
- Thought-terminating cliché
- Thought
- Thought broadcasting
- Thought disorder
- Thought experiment
- Thought Field Therapy
- Thought insertion
- Thought withdrawal
- Thousand-yard stare
- Three Essays on the Theory of Sexuality
- Timeline of psychology
- Toilet training
- Token economy
- Tonic–clonic seizure
- Touch illusion
- Tourette syndrome
- Traffic psychology
- Trait theory
- Transactional analysis
- Transderivational search
- Transduction
- Transfer (propaganda)
- Transfer of learning
- Transfer of training
- Transference
- Transference neurosis
- Transpersonal
- Transpersonal psychology
- Transsexual
- Transsexualism
- Transtheoretical model
- Transvestic fetishism
- Psychological trauma
- Tree of Knowledge System
- Triarchic theory of intelligence
- Triskaidekaphobia
- Trisomy
- Trollope ploy
- True experiment
- Trust
- Trust metric
- Trypanophobia
- Tumescence
- Twelve-step program
- Twin study
- Type A and Type B personality theory
- Type D personality

== U ==
- Ultradian rhythm
- Unconditional positive regard
- Unconditioned response
- Unconditioned stimulus
- Unconscious mind
- Understanding
- Undifferentiated schizophrenia
- Unipolar depression
- United Kingdom Council for Psychotherapy
- Universal law of generalization
- Universalization

== V ==
- Valence
- Value
- Value theory
- Vascular dementia
- Vegetotherapy
- Vertical thinking
- Victim blaming
- Victim playing
- Victimisation
- Victimology
- Vienna Psychoanalytic Society
- Vigilance
- Visual learning
- Visual thinking
- Volition
- Voodoo death
- Voyeurism
- Vulnerability

== W ==
- Wakefulness
- Waxy flexibility
- Weapon focus
- Web Experimental Psychology Lab
- Wechsler Adult Intelligence Scale
- Wechsler Intelligence Scale for Children
- Wechsler Preschool and Primary Scale of Intelligence
- William Alanson White Institute
- Wise old man
- Withdrawal symptoms
- Witzelsucht
- Womb envy
- Word salad
- Working memory
- Working through
- World Federation for Mental Health

== X ==
- Xenophobia

== Y ==
- Yerkes–Dodson law
- Young adult

== Z ==
- Zeitgeist
- Zener cards
- Zero-defects mentality
- Zoosadism

== See also ==
- Psychology-related
  - Outline of psychology
  - List of counseling topics
  - Psychology journals
  - List of psychology topic lists
  - List of thinking-related topic lists
- General reference
  - List of reference pages
  - List of topic lists
