= MCAS =

MCAS may refer to:

- Maneuvering Characteristics Augmentation System, an airplane flight stabilizing feature
- Marine Corps Air Station, a designation of multiple installations of the United States Marine Corps
- Maritime Collision Avoidance System
- Massachusetts Comprehensive Assessment System, a standards-based education assessment system
- Mast cell activation syndrome, an immunological disorder
- Matrícula Consular or Matricula Consular de Alta Seguridad, an identification card issued by the Government of Mexico
- Michigan City Area Schools a school district in Michigan City, Indiana
- Microsoft Cloud App Security, a cloud security product by Adallom
- Multnomah Community Ability Scale, a standardized mental health assessment

== See also ==
- MCA (disambiguation)
- Emcas, British financial claims company
