= Transduction =

Transduction (trans- + -duc- + -tion, "leading through or across") can refer to:

- Signal transduction, any process by which a biological cell converts one kind of signal or stimulus into another
  - Olfactory transduction
  - Sugar signal transduction
- Transduction (biophysics), the conveyance of energy from a donor electron to a receptor electron, during which the class of energy changes
- Transduction (genetics), the transfer of DNA from one cell to another using a virus or viral vector
  - Tbx18 transduction, a cardiac therapy method
- Transduction (machine learning), the process of directly drawing conclusions about new data from previous data, without constructing a model
- Transduction (physiology), the transportation of stimuli to the nervous system
- Transduction (psychology), reasoning from specific cases to general cases, typically employed by children during their development
- A process by which a transducer converts one type of energy to another
