= Preconditioning (disambiguation) =

Preconditioning is a concept in numerical linear algebra.

Preconditioning may also refer to:

- Preconditioning (adaptation), a general concept in which an entity is exposed to a form of some stress or stimulus in order to prepare that entity to be more resilient against the stimulus when and if the stimulus is encountered in the future.
  - Ischemic preconditioning, an experimental technique for producing resistance to the loss of blood supply to tissues of many types
- Sensory preconditioning, a phenomenon of classical conditioning that demonstrates learning of an association between two conditioned stimuli
- Conditioning in stem cell transplantation before the stem cell transfer.

== See also ==
- Precondition
