= Fascism (disambiguation) =

Fascism is a far-right authoritarian political ideology.

Fascism or fascist may refer to:

- Fascism (book), a nonfiction book edited by Roger Griffin
- Fascism: A Warning, a 2018 book by Madeleine Albright
- The Fascist, a 1961 play by Luciano Salce
- Fascist (insult)

== See also ==
- Face-ism
