= EMCA =

EMCA can refer to:

- East Memorial Christian Academy, a former private K-12 Christian school in Autauga County, Alabama
- Eastern Manitoba Concert Association, an association in Pinawa, Canada, which hosts concerts in a Pinawa's community centre
- El Monte, California, a city in California and in the United States
- Emeralda Marsh Conservation Area, a U.S. conservation area
- Advanced emergency medical care assistant, a credential used for emergency medical technicians in Ontario, Canada
- Epithelial-myoepithelial carcinoma, a rare malignant tumour that typically arises in a salivary gland
- Ethnomethodology and conversation analysis, two fields of study sometimes considered as one field and referred to as EMCA
  - Ethnomethodology and conversation analysis, an application area within social media, ubiquitous computing, and instant message based social commerce
- European Mosquito Control Association, an association for mosquito control
- European Multisport Club Association, a sports organization representing the interests of multisport clubs in Europe

== See also ==
- ECMA (disambiguation)
- Emcas
