= Carl E. Thoresen =

American psychologist (1933–2020)

- Born: July 22, 1933; San Francisco, California
- Died: October 20, 2020 (aged 87)
- Education: University of California, Berkeley
- Scientific career
- Fields: Psychology, counseling psychology

Carl E. Thoresen (July 22, 1933 – October 20, 2020) was a psychologist on the faculty of Stanford University. From 2005, he was also a senior fellow at Santa Clara University.

== Education and academic career ==
Many events and achievements in Thoresen's career as a psychologist were described in a profile published in 2009 in The Counseling Psychologist (CP), as part of its "Legacies and Traditions" series. Thoresen graduated with a B.A. from the University of California, Berkeley with a bachelor's degree in history (1955), later received his MA (counseling, 1960) and PhD (psychological studies, counseling psychology, 1964) from Stanford University. After a brief period as an assistant professor of counseling at Michigan State (1965–1967), he returned to Stanford as assistant professor of education (1967). From 1975 until 2000 he served as professor of education, and by courtesy, psychology, and psychiatry. From 2000, he held the same title with emeritus status. From 2005, he was also a senior fellow at the Spirituality and Health Institute at Santa Clara University.

According to his CP profile, he was also:

- President, Counseling & Human Development, American Educational Research Association (1974–1976).
- President of the Division of Counseling Psychology, American Psychological Association (1978–1979).
- Founder and Elected Chair, American Psychological Association, Counseling Health Psychology Section, Division 17 (1997–1999).
- Founder and Chair, Society of Behavioral Medicine, Spirituality and Health Special Interest Group (2000-).

Thoresen has been awarded honorary doctorates by the Faculty of Social Sciences at Uppsala University, Sweden (1986), and by the National University of Ireland (Literature, 2004). He was awarded a Guggenheim Fellowship in 1973. He was an elected Fellow of several major organisations, including the American Association for the Advancement of Science (1982-), the American Psychological Association (1972-) and the Society of Behavioural Medicine (1986-). His professional publications number more than 200.

== Research and influence ==
According to the CP interview, Thoresen's "scholarly work, professional service, teaching, and mentorship have motivated many counseling psychologists to radically expand their areas of inquiry. He was among the first to focus counseling on observable behaviors and to apply psychological science and interventions to physical problems in medical settings. More recently, he has pioneered the study of the interface between spirituality and health" (p. 275).

Beginning in 1973, Thoresen collaborated with well-known cardiologist Meyer Friedman. They worked together on the Recurrent Coronary Prevention Project, which followed 1013 heart attack survivors for 4.5 years to determine effects from altering their coronary-prone (type A) behavior patterns. Thoresen was responsible "to help design and direct the psychological treatment program based on a behavioral self-control perspective" (p. 282). Results indicated that behavioral counseling reduced rates of recurrence to 13% (from 21% or higher). After the first year, those receiving behavioral counseling also experienced significantly lower rates of death. The study showed, "for the first time, within a controlled experimental design, that altering type A behavior reduces cardiac morbidity and mortality in post infarction patients" (p. 653).
