= ECMA =

ECMA or Ecma may refer to:

- Ecma International (formerly European Computer Manufacturers Association), a standards organization for information communication technology and consumer electronics
- Engineering College Magazines Associated, a group of student-run engineering-based publications in the US
- East Coast Music Association, that hosts the East Coast Music Awards, an annual awards ceremony in Canada

== See also ==
- EMCA (disambiguation)
- ECMAScript, a scripting language standardized by Ecma International whose best-known dialect is JavaScript
- List of Ecma standards
