= Sentence completion tests =

Class of personality tests

Sentence completion tests are a class of semi-structured projective techniques. Sentence completion tests typically provide respondents with beginnings of sentences, referred to as "stems", and respondents then complete the sentences in ways that are meaningful to them. The responses are believed to provide indications of attitudes, beliefs, motivations, or other mental states. Therefore, sentence completion technique, with such advantage, promotes the respondents to disclose their concealed feelings. Notwithstanding, there is debate over whether or not sentence completion tests elicit responses from conscious thought rather than unconscious states. This debate would affect whether sentence completion tests can be strictly categorized as projective tests.

A sentence completion test form may be relatively short, such as those used to assess responses to advertisements, or much longer, such as those used to assess personality. A long sentence completion test is the Forer Sentence Completion Test, which has 100 stems. The tests are usually administered in booklet form where respondents complete the stems by writing words on paper.

The structures of sentence completion tests vary according to the length and relative generality and wording of the sentence stems. Structured tests have longer stems that lead respondents to more specific types of responses; less structured tests provide shorter stems, which produce a wider variety of responses.

== History ==
Hermann Ebbinghaus is generally credited with developing the first sentence completion test in 1897. Ebbinghaus's sentence completion test was used as part of an intelligence test. Simultaneously, Carl Jung's word association test may also have been a precursor to modern sentence completion tests. Moreover, in recent decades, sentence completion tests have increased in usage, in part because they are easy to develop and easy to administer. As of the 1980s, sentence completion tests were the eighty-fifth most widely used personality assessment instruments. Another reason for the increased usage of sentence completion tests is because of their superiority to other measures in uncovering conflicted attitudes. Some sentence completion tests were developed as a way to overcome the problems associated with thematic apperception measures of the same constructs.

== Uses ==
The uses of sentence completion tests include personality analysis, clinical applications, attitude assessment, achievement motivation, and measurement of other constructs. They are used in several disciplines, including psychology, management, education, and marketing.

Sentence completion measures have also been incorporated into non-projective applications, such as intelligence tests, language comprehension, and language and cognitive development tests.

== Examples ==
There are many sentence completion tests available for use by researchers. Some of the most widely used sentence completion tests include:

- Rotter Incomplete Sentence Blank (assesses personality traits; perhaps the most widely used of all sentence completion tests).
- Miner Sentence Completion Test (measures managerial motivations).
- Washington University Sentence Completion Test (WUSCT) from Jane Loevinger (measures ego development).

== Data analysis, validity and reliability ==
The data collected from sentence completion tests can usually be analyzed either quantitatively or qualitatively. Usually, sentence completion tests can be interpreted in two different ways: subjective-intuitive analysis of the underlying motivations projected in the subject's responses, or objective analysis by means of scores assigned to each completed sentence. Multiple themes can occur in a short test, which gives the examinee multiple opportunities to reveal underlying motivations about each topic during data analysis. Of course, most sentence completion tests are much longer (anywhere from 40 to 100 stems) and contain more themes (anywhere from 4 to 15 topics).

Sentence completion tests usually include some formal coding procedure or manual. The validity of each sentence completion test must be determined independently and this depends on the instructions laid out in the scoring booklet.

Compared to positivist instruments, such as Likert-type scales, sentence completion tests tend to have high face validity (i.e., the extent to which measurement items accurately reflect the concept being measured). This is to be expected, because in many cases the sentence stems name or refer to specific objects and the respondent provides responses specifically focused on such objects.
