= Meyer Friedman =

American cardiologist (1910–2001)

Meyer Friedman (July 13, 1910 – April 27, 2001) was an American cardiologist who developed, with colleague Ray H. Rosenman, the hypothesis that the "Type A" behavior of chronically angry and impatient people increases their risk of heart disease. Also a researcher, he worked until his death at 90 as director of a medical institute that bears his name.

== Early years ==
Friedman was born in Kansas City on July 13, 1910. He graduated from Yale University with an A.B. degree during 1931 and continued to medical school at Johns Hopkins University. He obtained his M.D. degree there during 1935. He spent the years 1936 to 1938 completing his postgraduate training at Michael Reese Hospital in Illinois.

Four years after graduating from Johns Hopkins, Friedman initiated the Harold Brunn Institute for Cardiovascular Research. This institution is still existing as part of the University of California.

Later in his life, Friedman would acknowledge that he has Type A behavior and those who knew him growing up were able to describe him as such. One acquaintance said that "in his early days he was known as Cannonball Mike, for his explosive way of coming into a room." His personality persisted until his adult life and this could also be demonstrated in the way his research assistants did not last long.

== Work ==
The discovery of the Type A behavior was accidental and involved furniture. Friedman was classic Type A and he often cited this in his lectures, emphasizing that he had two coronary bypass operations at an early age.

== Research ==
Beginning during the 1970s, Friedman collaborated with Stanford University psychologist Carl E. Thoresen and others in the Recurrent Coronary Prevention Project, which followed 1013 heart attack survivors for 4.5 years to determine effects from altering their coronary-prone (type A) behavior patterns. Results indicated that behavioral counseling reduced rates of recurrence to 13% (from 21% or higher). After the first year, those receiving behavioral counseling also experienced significantly lesser rates of death. The study showed, "for the first time, within a controlled experimental design, that altering type A behavior reduces cardiac morbidity and mortality in post infarction patients".

Friedman published and co-authored more than 500 articles, most of them about coronary heart disease.

== Death ==
Friedman died after a short illness in 2001 at UC San Francisco Medical Center. He was survived by a daughter and two sons.
