= Julian Rotter =

American psychologist

- Born: October 22, 1916; Brooklyn, New York, U.S.
- Died: January 6, 2014 (aged 97); Mansfield, Connecticut, U.S.
- Education: Brooklyn College; University of Iowa; Indiana University Bloomington
- Known for: social learning theory, Rotter Incomplete Sentence Blank and Locus of Control
- Awards: William James Fellow Award
- Scientific career
- Fields: Psychology
- Workplaces: Ohio State University; University of Connecticut
- Doctoral advisor: C. M. Louttit

Julian B. Rotter (October 22, 1916 – January 6, 2014) was an American psychologist known for developing social learning theory and research into locus of control. He was a faculty member at Ohio State University and then the University of Connecticut. A Review of General Psychology survey, published in 2002, ranked Rotter as the 64th most eminent and 18th most widely cited psychologist of the 20th century. A 2014 study published in 2014 placed him at #54 among psychologists whose careers spanned the post-World War II era.

== Background ==
Rotter was born in 1916 in Brooklyn, New York, United States, as the third son of Jewish immigrant parents. As a schoolboy he became interested with psychology and philosophy through readings. Rotter attended Brooklyn College in 1933, where he earned his undergraduate degree in 1937. He majored in chemistry even though he found psychology to be more fascinating because chemistry seemed more remunerative. While studying in Brooklyn College, Solomon Asch (best known for his later studies of conformity) influenced his development. Asch was then intensely involved in the controversy between Gestalt and Thorndikian views of learning. Another important influence in these years was Alfred Adler, who was teaching at the Long Island School of Medicine. After Rotter asked a question at a public lecture, Adler invited him to attend his weekly training clinic despite the fact that Rotter was only an undergraduate at the time. Adler inspired him by his lectures on the scientific method.

He then earned a master's degree at the University of Iowa in 1938, studying there under Kurt Lewin, the renowned gestalt psychologist whose field theory of personality, with its emphasis on goals, valence, and barriers, clearly influenced Rotter's later theory-building.

After completing his master's degree, he obtained an internship at the Worcester State Hospital, possibly the only formal internship in clinical psychology at the time. While at Worcester State Hospital, David Shakow, Saul Rosenzweig, and Elliot Rodnick provided stimulation and training in research and practice. Worcester was also where he met Clara Barnes, another intern, whom he later married. Through his work with Kurt Lewin, he became interested in level of aspiration, then a popular research topic, and designed and built the Level of Aspiration Board as a way of studying individual differences in this personality feature. At Iowa, he was also influenced by Wendell Johnson, a general semanticist, who impressed on him the need for careful definitions in psychology and the myriad of pitfalls involved in poorly defined and poorly operationalized constructs

He continued his graduate studies at Indiana University Bloomington where he continued to study the effects of success and failure on subsequent performance using the level of aspiration paradigm, completing his doctorate there (under the direction of C. M. Louttit) in 1941. Throughout his education, Rotter was influenced by Alfred Adler, Clark Hull, B.F. Skinner, and Edward Tolman.

After earning his doctorate he was unable to obtain a faculty position owing to the anti-Semitism then prevalent in academia, but accepted a position at Norwich Hospital; soon after, Rotter was drafted into the United States Army during World War II. In the Army, Rotter worked as a psychologist, except for 17 weeks in officer candidate training as a tank officer. After the war he returned, again briefly, to Norwich Hospital before being recruited by Ohio State University, where he taught and served as director of the psychological services clinic (a key component of clinical training there) formerly headed by Louttit. At Ohio State, Rotter worked with George Kelly, founder of personal constructs theory. Both the Incomplete Sentences Blank (1950) and Rotter's seminal work, Social Learning and Clinical Psychology (1954) were published during his tenure there; most of the crucial "locus of control" studies were also conducted while at Ohio State.

In 1963, Rotter went to the University of Connecticut, becoming director of that school's clinical psychology program, where he remained for the rest of his career. The Interpersonal Trust Scale, a research measure of this personality feature, was developed by Rotter during that time. He assumed emeritus status in 1987, but continued to teach graduate classes in personality and test construction for several more years. Rotter also served as president of the American Psychological Association Division of Clinical Psychology, the Eastern Psychological Association, and the American Psychological Association Division of Social and Personality Psychology.

He died at the age of 97 on January 6, 2014, at his home in Mansfield, Connecticut.

== Incomplete Sentences Blank ==
During his military service, one of Rotter's tasks was to evaluate sick and injured soldiers for emotional fitness to return to active duty. One of the measures he used was an early sentence completion test, something that could be administered and evaluated quickly to identify those who needed further assessment and/or treatment. After the war he developed a standardized instrument of this type: the Rotter Incomplete Sentences Blank (RISB), first published in 1950. The test blank consists of 40 "stems" that the examinee is instructed to complete "to express your real feelings." A completed test protocol can be interpreted qualitatively by a trained examiner. In addition, Rotter and Rafferty introduced a formal scoring system by means of which the examinee's overall level of adjustment can be rated. This system, which can be used to a high degree of reliability across raters and was validated in a number of studies, was an important exception to the often subjective use of so-called projective personality tests at the time. The RISB was lightly revised and updated in 1992. It is generally found to be the most widely used sentence completion test in clinical settings.

== Social Learning Theory ==
When Rotter was a graduate student and early professional, American academic psychology was dominated by the approach known as behaviorism. The German school of gestalt psychology, an early form of cognitive science, was essentially the only alternative. Rotter was simultaneously attracted and dissatisfied by both. He liked the methodological and theoretical rigor of behaviorists like Clark Hull, but found their mechanistic learning theories too limited for application to complex human social behavior. He also found the gestalt "field theories" appealing, especially the work of his former professor Kurt Lewin, but was disturbed by their imprecision and failure to generate specific predictions. Like the experimentalist Edward C. Tolman, Rotter aspired to develop a theory that combined the best elements of both; this became the nucleus of what he termed Social Learning Theory (SLT). Rotter saw SLT as an alternative to psychoanalysis and behaviorism that would be useful to clinicians and researchers alike. His theoretical model was more or less fully articulated in Social Learning and Clinical Psychology (1954). Here, Rotter proposed that human behavior is the interactive result of two underlying forces: expectancy and reinforcement value. Expectancy refers to the subjective probability (i.e., the probability as estimated by the individual) that a given action will lead to a given (reinforcing or punishing) outcome. In principle, it can be represented by a number between 0.00 (zero probability) and 1.00 (absolute certainty). Reinforcement value refers to the degree to which a person desires to attain (or avoid) a given outcome assuming that all outcomes are equally likely. In other words, reinforcement value is independent of expectancy. A person is likely to choose a particular course of action only if they believe themselves likely to succeed in attaining the goal and desire said goal. The minimal goal level is the threshold value; outcomes more positive than this are reinforcing, while outcomes less positive are punishing. Importantly, both expectancies and values are learned, and as with other forms of learning, they generalize. For example, after acquiring considerable experience in a variety of sporting events, a person develops a generalized expectancy for success in athletic endeavors. (Sometimes this is termed 'freedom of movement.') Likewise, a person may generalize across reinforcers that gratify related needs, developing a greater or lesser need value for a class of reinforcers. Generalized expectancies and need values, being based on multiple learning experiences, become increasingly stable over time and develop a trait-like consistency - but unlike the personality traits described by researchers like Hans Eysenck, they are still the products of learning and still susceptible to change in response to future experiences. According to SLT, the two key variables affecting the degree to which expectancies change in response to new experience are the extent of prior experience (more experience = more resistance to change) and the degree of contrast between the pre-existing expectancy and the current outcome (greater contrast = greater change). One may perceive Lewin's influence in all of this - and Adler's in the notion of a person discouraged after repeated failure experiences (i.e., having acquired a low expectancy of success). What was remarkable about SLT was that its principles could be represented as equations and used to generate relatively precise point predictions of behavioral choice. This social learning theory suggests that behavior is influenced by social context or environmental factors, and not psychological factors alone. In addition to describing the theory and the results of numerous experiments verifying many of its hypotheses, Rotter's 1954 book contained many suggestions for clinical practice that anticipated cognitive-behavioral therapy.

== Locus of Control ==
An important refinement of Rotter's Social Learning Theory was the concept of generalized expectancies for problem-solving skills. Originally the generalization of expectancy was thought of as taking place purely along lines of expected reinforcers (e.g., academic or social success). But Rotter and his colleagues came to realize that people may also generalize on the basis of the problem-solving approach they employed. For example, searching for alternatives is a way of approaching many problems, and people vary in the degree to which they believe this is likely to be effective. This concept added a new class of personality-related variables to the theory. The problem-solving generalized expectancy to which Rotter and his students devoted most attention during the next several years was the extent to which people believe that reinforcing outcomes are primarily dependent on their own efforts (internal) as opposed to being under the control of fate, chance, or powerful others (external). This concept came to be known as locus of control. In 1966, Rotter published his famous I-E scale in the journal "Psychological Monographs", to assess internal and external locus of control. This paper became the single most widely cited source in the social science literature, and the scale has been widely used in the psychology of personality, although its use of a two-alternative forced choice technique has made it subject to criticism. Rotter himself was astounded by how much attention this scale generated, claiming that it was like lighting a cigarette and seeing a forest fire. He himself believed that the scale was an adequate measure of just two concepts, achievement motivation (which he took to be linked with internal locus of control) and outer-directedeness, or tendency to conform to others (which he took to be associated with external locus of control). Critics of the scale have frequently voiced concern that locus of control is not as homogenous a concept as Rotter's paper implied.

== Legacy ==
Rotter has been reported as one of the most eminent psychologists of the 20th century. He was 18th in frequency of citations in journal articles and 64th in overall eminence. His seminal studies of the variable of internal versus external locus of control provided the foundation of prolific research into choice and perceived control in several disciplines. His pioneer social learning framework transformed behavioral approaches to personality and clinical psychology.

He had two children after marrying Clara Barnes, whom he had met at Worcester State. Rotter was married from 1941 until his wife died in 1985.
