= Sander illusion =

Optical illusion

The Sander illusion

The Sander illusion or Sander's parallelogram is an optical illusion described by the German psychologist Friedrich Sander (1889–1971) in 1926. However, it had been published earlier by Matthew Luckiesh in his 1922 book Visual Illusions: Their Causes, Characteristics, and Applications .

The diagonal line bisecting the larger, left-hand parallelogram appears to be considerably longer than the diagonal line bisecting the smaller, right-hand parallelogram, but it is the same length.

One possible reason for this illusion is that the diagonal lines around the blue lines give a perception of depth, and when the blue lines are included in that depth, they are perceived as different lengths.

Another explanation is that the illusion is caused by the acute angles in the right parallelogram and the obtuse angles in the left parallelogram, which deceptively influence the perception of line lengths. Obtuse angles have a strong tendency to seemingly lengthen the lines involved. The left diagonal divides two obtuse interior angles and therefore appears longer, while the right diagonal divides two acute interior angles and is therefore perceived as shortened.

The German psychologist Wolfgang Metzger (1899–1979) also described the general phenomenon in this context that in a (non-right-angled) parallelogram, the longer diagonal appears shortened and the shorter one appears longer.
