= Rotter Incomplete Sentences Blank =

Projective psychological test developed by Julian B. Rotter

The Rotter Incomplete Sentences Blank is a semi-projective psychological test developed by Julian B. Rotter. It comes in three forms (for different age groups) and comprises 40 incomplete sentences usually only 1–2 words long, such as "I regret ..." and "Mostly girls ...". As with other sentence completion tests, the subject is asked to complete the sentence.

== The test ==
The Rotter Incomplete Sentences Blank is a semi-projective psychological test developed by Julian Rotter and Janet E. Rafferty in 1950. It comes in three forms i.e. school form, college form, adult form for different age groups, and comprises 40 incomplete sentences which the S's has to complete as soon as possible but the usual time taken is around 20 minutes, the responses are usually only 1–2 words long such as "I regret ..." and "Mostly girls...". the test can be administered both individually and in a group setting. It doesn't have long set of instructions and can be easily worked out on a greater population.

=== Purpose ===
The Rotter Incomplete Sentences Blank is an attempt to standardize the sentence completion method for the use at college level. Forty stems are completed by the subject. These completions are then scored by comparing them against typical items in empirically derived scoring manuals for men and women and by assigning to each response a scale value from 0 to 6. The total score is an index of maladjustment

=== The sentence completion method ===
The sentence completion method of studying personality is a semi structured projective technique in which the subject is asked to finish a sentence for which the first word or words are supplied. As in other projective devices, it is assumed that the subject reflects his own wishes, desires, fears and attitudes in the sentences he makes. Historically, the incomplete sentence method is related most closely to the word association test. In some test incomplete sentences tests only a single word or brief response is called for; the major differences appears to be in the length of the stimulus. In the sentence completion tests, tendencies to block and to twist the meaning of the stimulus words appear and the responses may be categorized in a somewhat similar fashion to the word association method.

=== Development ===
The Incomplete Sentences Blank consists of forty items revised from a form used by Rotter and Willermann (11) in the army. This form was, in turn, a revision of blanks used by Shor (15), Hutt (5), and Holzberg (4) at the Mason General Hospital. In the development of the ISB, two objectives were kept in mind. One aim was to provide a technique which could be used objectively for screening and experimental purposes. It was felt that this technique should have at least some of the advantages of projective methods, and also be economical from the point of view of administration and scoring. A second goal was to obtain information of rather specific diagnostic value for treatment purposes.

The Incomplete Sentences Blank can be used, of course, for general interpretation with a variety of subjects in much the same manner that a clinician trained in dynamic psychology uses any projective material. However, a feature of ISB is that one can derive a single over-all adjustment score. This over-all adjustment score is of particular value for screening purposes with college students and in experimental studies. The ISB has also been used in a vocational guidance center to select students requiring broader counseling than was usually given, in experimental studies of the effect of psychotherapy and in investigations of the relationship of adjustment to a variety of variables.

== Advantages ==
The general advantages of the sentence completion method can be summarized as follows

- There is freedom of response. That is, the subject is not forced to answer yes or no to the examiner question. They can respond any way they want.
- It's not clear to subjects how their responses will be interpreted. Although the subject made aware of general intent, what constitutes a good or bad answer is not readily apparent to most subjects.
- Group administration is relatively efficient. Most incomplete sentences tests can be given to a group of any size without apparent loss of validity.
- No special training is ordinarily necessary for administration. Interpretation depends on the examiner's general clinical experience, although the examiner does not need specific training in the use of this method.
- The method is extremely flexible in that new sentence beginnings can be constructed or tailor-made for a variety of clinical, applied and experimental purposes

=== Disadvantages ===
- Although susceptible to semi-objective scoring, it cannot be machine scored and requires general skill and knowledge of personality analysis for clinical appraisal and interpretation.
- There is not as much disguise of purpose as in other projective methods. Consequently, a sophisticated subject may be able to keep the examiner from knowing what he does not wish to reveal.
- Insufficient material is obtained in some cases, particularly from illiterate, disturbed or uncooperative subjects. Application of the method as a group test also requires writing and language skills and has not yet been adequately evaluated for potential clinical usefulness for younger children.
