= Large-group communication =

Large group communication is a communication in groups of a dozen to a few thousand people. Unlike small-group communication these are groups that too large to maintain a conversation between the members. Unlike mass communication, large-group communication does still allow for feedback between the audience and the communicators. Examples of large-group communication include lectures and concerts.
