= MCA =

MCA may refer to:

== Science and technology ==
=== Astronomy ===
- Mars-crossing asteroid, an asteroid whose orbit crosses that of Mars

=== Aviation ===
- Minimum crossing altitude, a minimum obstacle crossing altitude for fixes on published airways
- Medium Combat Aircraft, a 5th generation fighter aircraft in India's HAL AMCA (Advanced Medium Combat Aircraft) program
- Macenta Airport, Guinea (by IATA code)
- Ministry of Civil Aviation (United Kingdom) from 1941 to 1953

=== Biology and chemistry ===
- MacConkey agar, a selective growth medium for bacteria
- Monochloroacetic acid, carboxylic acid, manufactured by chlorinating acetic acid
- Methylcholanthrene, a carcinogen
- Methyl cyanoacrylate, an organic compound
- Metabolic control analysis, analysing how the control of fluxes and intermediate concentrations in a metabolic pathway is distributed
- Middle cerebral artery, one of the three major blood supplies to the brain

=== Climate ===
- Medieval Climatic Anomaly (Medieval Warm Period, also Medieval Climate Optimum), a notably warm climatic period in the North Atlantic region from about 950 to 1250.

=== Statistics and data science ===
- Membership categorization analysis, a method of studying categorization in interaction
- Multiple correspondence analysis

=== Technology ===
- Machine Check Architecture, a method for a CPU to report hardware errors to an operating system
- Maximum credible accident, a postulated scenario that a nuclear facility must be able to withstand
- Micro Channel architecture, a type of computer bus
- Mitsubishi MCA, an emissions control approach for gasoline-powered vehicles during the 1970s
- Movable cellular automaton
- Multichannel analyzer, instrument recording pulse counts at a range of (esp. photon energy) levels

== Companies and organizations ==
=== Companies ===
- MCA Inc., a now defunct company (originally called Music Corporation of America) and its subsidiary companies:
  - MCA Records
  - MCA Nashville Records
  - MCA Home Video, former name of Universal Pictures Home Entertainment
  - MCA Music Inc. (Philippines), a Philippine branch of Universal Music Group which uses the MCA brand due to a trademark issue
  - Music Corporation of America, the Nashville-based operations of Universal Music Group
- Maubeuge Construction Automobile (MCA), a subsidiary of French car manufacturer Renault
- Minato Communications Association, a former company name of the Japan Electronics and Information Technology Industries Association

=== Sports ===
- MC Alger, a football club based in Algiers, Algeria
- Manitoba Curling Association, Manitoba, Canada
- Maharashtra Cricket Association, Pune, India
  - Maharashtra Cricket Association Stadium, Pune, India
- Margaret Court Arena, Melbourne, Australia
- Mumbai Cricket Association, Mumbai, India

=== Government and politics ===
- Malaysian Chinese Association, a political party in Malaysia
- Maritime and Coastguard Agency, an agency of the United Kingdom Government
- Medicines Control Agency, which merged with the Medical Devices Agency to become the Medicines and Healthcare products Regulatory Agency in the UK
- Millennium Challenge Account, a U.S. program for aid to developing countries
- Ministry of Corporate Affairs, an Indian government ministry

=== Other organizations ===
- Maharashtra Chess Association
- Medal Collectors of America
- Metal Construction Association
- Metropolitan Church Association, Methodist denomination in the holiness movement
- Minerals Council of Australia
- MotorCoach Australia
- Multicore Association, an industry association regrouping companies and universities interested in multicore computing research
- Mumbai Cricket Association, ruling body for cricket in Mumbai
- Museum of Contemporary Art (disambiguation), numerous museums around the world
- Music Council of Australia, former peak body for music in Australia (1993–2020)

== Education ==
=== Degrees ===
- Master in Customs Administration, a trade-related graduate degree offered in PMI Colleges in the Philippines
- Master of Computer Applications, a postgraduate degree in computer science offered in India

=== Educational institutions ===
- Marist College Ashgrove, an Australian School
- McIntosh County Academy, a high school in McIntosh County, Georgia, United States
- Memphis College of Art, an art school in Tennessee, United States
- Morrison Christian Academy, an American school in Taiwan

=== Professional courses ===
- Microsoft Certified Architect, a certification available from Microsoft
- Minnesota Comprehensive Assessments—Series II, a standardized test in Minnesota

=== Other ===
- Metro College Alliance, a consortium of colleges in Fargo-Moorhead, USA

== Legal ==
- Depository Institutions Deregulation and Monetary Control Act, a US financial statute passed in 1980
- Mental Capacity Act 2005, an Act of the Parliament of the United Kingdom applying to England and Wales
- Military Commissions Act of 2006, US legislation

== People ==
- Adam Yauch (1964–2012), a.k.a. "MCA", of the Beastie Boys
- Michiel van den Bos (born 1975), a.k.a. "M.C.A.", Dutch composer
- Chris Avellone (born 1971), a.k.a. "MCA", American video game designer

== Other uses ==
- Merchant cash advance, a form of business funding/financing through the purchase of future receivables
- The Maká language (ISO 639-3 Code)
- Middle Class Abbayi, a 2017 Indian film also known as MCA
- Motor Coach Age, the magazine of the Motor Bus Society
- Mecheda railway station (station code: MCA) in West Bengal, India
