= Semantic dyslexia =

Semantic dyslexia is, as the name suggests, a subtype of the group of cognitive disorders known as alexia (acquired dyslexia). Those who have semantic dyslexia are unable to properly attach words to their meanings in reading or speech. When confronted with the word "diamond", they may understand it as "sapphire", "shiny" or "diamonds"; when asking for a bus ticket, they may ask for some paper or simply "a thing".

Semantic dementia (SD) is a degenerative disease characterized by atrophy of anterior temporal regions (the primary auditory cortex; process auditory information) and progressive loss of semantic memory. SD patients often present with surface dyslexia, a relatively selective impairment in reading low-frequency words with exceptional or atypical spelling-to-sound correspondences.
