= Post-cognitivist psychology =

Post-cognitivist psychology comprises varieties of psychology that have emerged since the 1990s, challenging the basic assumptions of cognitivism and information processing models of cognition, and forms one of the fields contributing to the postcognitivism movement. Important predecessors of these movements include critical psychology and humanistic psychology.

== See also ==
- Situated cognition
- Distributed cognition
- Embodied cognition
- Dynamicism
- Discursive psychology
