= Backward inhibition =

In experimental psychology, backward inhibition, is a theory of sequential task control asserting that switching between tasks requires the just-completed task to be suppressed to allow a new task to be completed. Support for the theory comes from research which has observed larger response times when returning to a task after an intermediate task than when completing three, or more, different tasks in a row. This typically comes in an ABA format, with the response time of task A the second time taking longer after having completed task B. Backward inhibition is not seen in scenarios with an ABC format, where no task is being repeated.

== Etymology ==
The word inhibition, in the late Middle English meant a ‘forbidding, a prohibition.' It originally came from the Latin verb inhibere,‘hinder,’ from habere or ‘to hold.’ Backward inhibition is a description of the cognitive process that, at its base, means "to hold" something that happened previously in order to process a current event.

== Early studies ==
Muller and Pilzecker (1900) established that if information was presented and a task was required before the information was asked to be recalled, that the task interfered with the ability to recall the information. They established that if information was presented and a task was required before the information was asked to be recalled, that the task interfered with the ability to recall the information. They called the process by which the recall of information was inhibited retroactive interference, sometimes also called retroactive inhibition or (RI). This study led the way in many areas of retention and memory research, particularly in studies on cognitive interference and RI. Researchers put forward different theories on what was causing the interference. Researchers Melton and von Lackum proposed in 1941 an "unlearning" process to explain RI. They believed that the individuals had to literally begin unlearning the first set of information in order to process the second set.

Two theories emerged in the early to mid-1900s to explain RI 1) the preservation theory and 2) the transfer theory. The preservation theory stated that the second task interfered with the mind's ability to properly preserve the information from the first task. The transfer theory affirmed that the inhibition came from either a confusion of the information from the first and second tasks or because the information from the second somehow blocked information from the first.

== Recent research and applications ==
Research was continued into the later 1900s to develop theories of the causes of interference. A major breakthrough came in 2000 with the findings of Mayr and Keele. Their initial study included several experiments. In the first experiment, the main goal was to prove the existence of standard backward inhibition. The participants were asked to follow sets of commands on a computer associated with four rectangles found in the middle of a black screen of varying sizes and colors, each set encompassing multiple commands. The first set of commands had to do with the rectangles' color and the second set with their size, and the third set again with their color. They found that for tasks A, B, and C, the response times for the third task will be slower in the case of an A-B-A sequence than a C-B-A sequence.

The second experiment was similar, but they included four different possible sets of commands instead of two, as well as other means designed to limit the possibility of negative priming. The results confirmed that the inhibitory process is not the result of priming. The third experiment was designed to confirm whether top-down processing or bottom-up processing was more responsible for backward inhibition. In the top-down scenario, participants had to rely on verbal commands to complete the task with the rectangles, activating top-down processing. In the bottom-up scenario, participants were not given any commands to complete the task. They had to completely rely on their own observations and sense to choose the right rectangles, activation bottom-up processing. This suggested that backward inhibition relies on top-down processing. The fourth experiment found that backward inhibition contributes at least partly to the shift costs between tasks, even when they are repeated many times. In the fifth and last experiment, it was tested whether knowing that the first task would be repeated after the second task would effect the response times of the participants. Foreknowledge of the various task changes and repetitions did not change the presence of backward inhibition.

=== Backward inhibition and rumination ===
Some evidence suggests that individuals who commonly ruminate have difficulty with backward inhibition. In a study conducted at Stanford University, Whitmer and Gotlib tested the "role of rumination" in backward inhibition and specifically in major depressive disorders. With a large control group and a large experimental group, they found that the rate at which someone switches from one task to another has little to do with depression and more to do with rumination. This suggests that rumination somehow prevents backward inhibition from taking place.

=== In hearing ===
→Backward inhibition seems to exist but not as clearly as it does in vision. When the stimulus is presented in a non-acoustic room, it takes only about 60 milliseconds between sounds for backward inhibition to take place. When in a room that reverberates, there seems to be a muffling of the previous sound into the current sound; there is not a clear distinction between the sounds as there is in vision.

=== In vision ===
→Backward inhibition in vision is a little more difficult to detect. A study done by Georg von Bekesy showed that certain elements were required for an image to be completely inhibited when another image appears. If an image is flashed 120 milliseconds or more after the first image was shown then the first image is completely inhibited. However, if the second image was flashed between 30 and 120 milliseconds after the first image than those two images tend to be perceived together.

=== In Language ===
→Backward inhibition is found with not only individuals who are able to speak more than one language but also highly proficient bilinguals. This suggests that no matter how experienced the linguist, there is still backward inhibition found when speaking in languages in an ABA format. It does not exist when switching from language A to language B to language C. However, it is true that the reaction time is longer when switching from the non-dominant language (B) back to the dominant language (A), consistent with research in asymmetrical backward inhibition.

=== Reducing task competition ===
It has been found that backward inhibition of mental processes can be activated when simply preparing for an alternate stimulus. In a study done by Mike Hubner and others, they found that having a goal for information of the latter task activates backward inhibition. Contrary to other research, they also found that backward inhibition did not occur as easily when a new task was presented unsuspectingly.

=== Asymmetrical backward inhibition ===
→When one task is a more dominant or harder task than the other, there is an asymmetrical amount of effort expended to inhibit it. In other words, the effort to retrieve the dominant task information is harder than retrieving the information associated with the non-dominant task. In an ABA format, where A is a harder task and B is an easier, the reaction time is greater, or the switching cost is higher, of changing from B back to A than in a situation where A and B are of similar difficulty. A switching cost is any cost that comes from trying to multitask and switch between more than task within a period of time rather than working on one task at a time. It usually consists of time lost but can also encompass other costs. In a study using a Stroop test, it was found that it was harder to switch from the more difficult task of naming the color of the word to reading the word than the other way around. It has been suggested that there is more effort required to inhibit the dominant action than to inhibit the non-dominant action, and therefore it is harder to, in a sense, "cancel" the inhibition and retrieve the needed memories and information about the dominant action.

== Cognitive processes ==
While some parts of completing different tasks and the associated switch costs involve and are influenced by conscious decisions and effort, backward inhibition is unconscious and does not seem to depend on conscious thought to happen. It also relies on top-down rather than bottom-up processing.
