= Care perspective =

Psychology concept

In psychology, the care perspective focuses on people in terms of their connectedness with others, interpersonal communication, relationships with others, and concern for others.

== See also ==
- Carol Gilligan
- Moral development
