= Sugar signal transduction =

Sugar signal transduction is an evolutionarily conserved mechanism used by organisms to survive. Sugars have an overwhelming effect on gene expression. In yeast, glucose levels are managed by controlling the mRNA levels of hexose transporters, while in mammals, the response to glucose is more tightly controlled with glucose metabolism and is therefore much more complex. Several glucose-responsive DNA motifs and DNA binding protein complexes have been identified in liver and b-cells. Although not proven, glucose repression appears to be conserved in plants because in many cases, both sugar induction and sugar repression are initiated by turning off transcription factors.

== See also ==
- Glycobiology
