= Engineering College Magazines Associated =

Engineering College Magazines Associated (ECMA) is a professional association of student engineering publications at colleges and universities in the United States.

== History ==
ECMA was founded in 1920 by W.B. Littell, who worked for the New York City advertising firm Littell-Murray-Barnhill.

According to the American Society for Engineering Education's Prism Magazine, "ECMA was created in the 1920s to be a single interface for companies wanting to recruit engineering graduates through ads in the magazines published by engineering colleges." There are records of ECMA member publications meeting for conferences as early as 1923.

== ECMA today ==
Over the years, ECMA has evolved into more of a professional society, recognizing student engineering publications and allowing students’ access to many top workers in the publication industry, as well as the knowledge they possess. Every year, one school hosts the ECMA conference.

== Past Conferences ==
- 2000 - University of California at Berkeley
- 2001 - University of Colorado
- 2002 - Ohio State University
- 2003 - University of Minnesota
- 2004 - University of Pennsylvania
- 2005 - University of Nebraska–Lincoln
- 2006 - Howard University (Scheduled but not held)

== Participating publications ==
- California Engineer (University of California at Berkeley)
- Colorado Engineer Magazine (University of Colorado at Boulder)
- Cornell Science and Technology Magazine (Cornell University)
- Engineers' Forum Magazine (Virginia Tech)
- Howard Engineer (Howard University)
- Illinois Technograph (University of Illinois)
- The E&S (Louisiana Tech University)
- Nebraska Blueprint (University of Nebraska)
- Ohio State Engineer (Ohio State University)
- Pennsylvania Triangle (University of Pennsylvania)
- Purdue Engineering Magazine (Purdue University)
- Technical Review (University of Notre Dame)
- Information Technology (University of Minnesota)
- Wisconsin Engineer (University of Wisconsin–Madison)
- Manhattan Engineer (Manhattan University)
