= Developmental profile =

Psychodynamic diagnostic instrument

A developmental profile is a standardized psychodynamic diagnostic instrument for assessing clinically relevant personality characteristics. It is based on the clinical observation that adult personality characteristics often bear a considerable similarity to the behavioural patterns of early childhood. Thus the psychoanalytical developmental theories and the classification of behaviour are integrated in the developmental profile.

The developmental profile is a matrix consisting of 10 developmental levels (horizontal rows) and nine developmental levels (vertical columns). Each line describes various categories of behaviour and for each line there are various phases in the development of the psychosocial capacities. The lowest six levels refer to maladaptive behaviour. The information for the developmental profile is obtained using a semi-structured interview that explores the patient's habitual behaviour during the previous decade.

A developmental profile can be made using a registration protocol. The information from filling in the developmental profile provides guidelines with respect to the goals of treatment and the manner in which they can be pursued. It can also be useful in understanding the behaviour of a patient.

Robert B. McCall, Mark I. Appelbaum, and Pamela S. Hogarty argue that "since there is no necessary relation between cross-age correlations and the nature of developmental profile contrours, and since individual subjects can display marked changes even though cross-age correlations are high, the investigation of change in developmental profile of mental performance should be considered a separate and important issue.

== See also ==
- Developmental psychology
