= Human modelling =

Human modelling is a kind of psychotherapy. The client is requested to 'make a person', i.e. a fictional character, and with human, lifelike qualities. In completion of this task, the client is asked to write or tell a life story ending in the present, about the fictional person, and/or make a model of the fictional person out of art material or whichever medium the client chooses.

The fictional person is then referred to as the 'modelled person', and is treated as if it is a 'real' person and a 'real' life. 'Real' in this context refers to transitional space in a Winnicottian sense.

By following these instructions, a therapeutic realm is created in which the client's subjective experience is brought to the fore, in the form of a metaphor. This allows the therapist and client to explore together the life, character and conflicts of the modelled person. It leaves various opportunities for the psychotherapist to influence the client. i.e. through role play, guided imagery, and taking on the role of the modelled person. The indirect (third person / metaphoric) way in which this form of therapy is conducted, seems to enhance the therapeutic effect and level of integration achieved. References to the similarities between client and modelled person are not encouraged.

Human Modelling is also successfully used as a group therapy in both hospital and other populations.

Human Modelling was created in 1969 by Professor A.L. Coetzee and his spouse Letitia Wilma Coetzee, while he was lecturer and head psychologist at Weskoppies Hospital, Pretoria, South Africa. After observing him at work, Professor Jan-Hendrik Van den Bergh extended an invitation to Coetzee to complete a D.Sos.Sc at the University of Leiden. Van den Bergh's phenomenologic approach seems to have influenced Coetzee to later on interpret the theory underlying Human Modelling along such lines. Initially the theory of Harry Stack Sullivan was used, and lately, an object relations approach.

Several academic works followed. Human Modelling is widely used and currently registered as a Continued Professional Development activity at the Health Professions Council of South Africa.
