= Memory augmentation =

Memory augmentation is the process by which one's ability to retain information is increased. The retrieval of memory has been theorized to be untrustworthy, and it can be partially inaccurate and not totally reliable (see more: Recovered memory.) Ubiquitous Memory Systems have been invented in order to reduce these memory mistakes. A study conducted by students of the Information Science Department in Nara, Japan sought to measure different types of memory augmentation. They used a computer system, the "Ubiquitous Memories," to demonstrate if the technology aided to augmentation better than other methods such as notes with a pen and paper, portraits used in a previous trial experiment, and just plain human memory. The results were that the Ubiquitous Memories aided in retrieving memory, and decreased the likelihood of mistakes in comparison to other methods.

Some researchers have even gone so far as to create mixed-reality simulations to assist individuals in improving their memories. Many of these systems implement the method of loci which involves using the spatial layout of a familiar place to help individuals remember certain things. For example, one might attempt to remember a packing list for a trip by imagining the items around their room.

Memory augmentation not only refers to our ability to recall information accurately, it also refers to our ability to encode long-term information quickly. Some researchers suggest that through using augmented reality interfaces, we have the ability to memorize information and store it in our long-term memory after only being exposed to it once. Specifically, the function of these interfaces is to stimulate parts of the brain that are essential to memory such as the hippocampus, neocortex, and entorhinal cortex which would result in the acquisition of episodic memory for things we would normally use long-term semantic memory to recall.

== Approaches to human memory ==
The traditional approach to memory is often what most people think of when they consider memory functions. This describes the instances in which individuals rely on areas of the brain, such as the hippocampus and the frontal lobe, to function properly in order to maximize memory. However, the situated approach relies on external memory aids and environmental cues.

Another approach to human memory augmentation is using devices such as cell phones to capture videos and pictures of various life events and experiences. These pictures and videos can serve as retrieval cues for not only that particular instance but also for other memories associated with the time the picture or video was taken. In addition to this, it is suggested that keeping journal entries of important life events, writing to-do lists, and keeping an updated calendar can all assist in augmenting memory. Researchers have recently been studying the concept of lifelogging, which refers to the ability to continuously film one’s life through wearable cameras. This would increase the human capacity to remember events correctly because it would allow the individual to go back and replay parts of their life that they have forgotten.

When it comes to visual memory, some researchers believe that it is possible to know what someone is paying attention to, and therefore to know what they will remember simply by tracking what they are looking at. In other words, when an individual is not looking at something, they are not paying attention and therefore will be less likely to remember what they were not looking at.

== Memory augmentation and aging ==
Memory augmentation techniques can vary in effectiveness between age groups. Children tend to have an easier time learning and remembering new information, while older adults often have a more difficult time learning new information. Because there is often a decline in memory abilities as individuals age, the traditional approach to memory is not always most effective. Rather, external environmental cues have been found to be more effective when it comes to memory augmentation of the elderly. Researchers have also suggested that in order to improve the memory augmentation of older adults, the pace at which the individual learns may need to be slowed down in order to allow for them to fully process the information being presented. In addition to this, it is suggested that learners should be vigilant about organizing their learning materials. This could include creating a tidy learning environment as well. Imagery techniques such as using the method of loci for example also assists in the augmentation of memory in older adults. In addition to this, mnemonics can be used to remember lists of items. It is also important for older adults to learn in supportive environments that encourage them to try their best while not subjecting them to unnecessary pressure to remember. As with individuals of any age, if there is a high amount of pressure to remember certain concepts or items in a list, the individual will have a more difficult time remembering them. It is also essential for older adults to know what types of memory changes are and are not normal as they age.

== Memory improvement strategies ==
There are four different strategies many individuals use to improve and augment their long-term memories, which are:

1. Nootropics: substances which can be consumed in an attempt to enhance memory encoding as well as retrieval. Nootropics are typically prescription medications such as Ritalin and Adderall which are used to treat various disorders such as Attention Deficit Hyperactivity Disorder (ADHD). Any type of substance which includes any form of psychoactive compounds can also be considered a nootropic. For example, the compounds found in energy drinks such as caffeine and taurine have also been shown to improve cognitive functioning, and in turn, improve memory.

2. Brain stimulation: transcranial magnetic stimulation (TMS) can be used to stimulate certain brain regions associated with memory in a non-invasive way. This causes those areas to be more activated than other areas of the brain when an individual is trying to remember something. This, however, requires special equipment only accessible in a laboratory and therefore cannot be used at home.

3. Mnemonics: commonly used memory techniques which involve strategies such as repetition, creating memorable phrases or words with the first letter of every word one wants to remember, using visual imagery, or creating a story involving the things which are necessary to remember.

4. External aids: memory technique that involves writing down what one wants to remember. Making lists and reminders to ourselves often can be beneficial in enhancing our abilities to remember more items for longer periods of time.

== Ubiquitous memories system ==
The Ubiquitous memories system contains two advantages:

1. Cognitive design (vs. subliminal vs. rehearsal): It is a new design in the system to recover problems. Cognitive design was demonstrated in a study conducted by DeVaul et al. The user can operate the cognitive load by him/her self to arrange his/her memories in both controllable conscious and unconscious cognitive traits. This design recover the problems in subliminal and rehearsal operation that memory augmentation will be hard to obtain when the user is over-supported by the operations.
2. Touching operation: Physically touching objects rather than simply looking at them can better aid an individual’s memory of that object because he or she now has tactile experience with it.

In order to select an object, the system must detect the object under the two conditions: 1:Dense/dust-covered object; a dense object is an object that is one of thickly gathered objects or one of piled object; a dust- covered object represents an object is not used often.

6 Procedures illustrate the Ubiquitous memories system:

1. A user perceives an event via his/her body.
2. The perceived event is stored into his/her brain as a memory.
3. The human body is used as media for propagating memories.
4. The transferred memory remains in the object.
5. He/she transfers the memory from the object to his/her body when interested in the object and then touches the object again.
6. He/she can recall the event.

== See also ==
- Method of loci
