= Type D personality =

Concept used in the field of medical psychology

Type D personality, a concept used in the field of medical psychology, is defined as the joint tendency towards negative affectivity (e.g. worry, irritability, gloom) and social inhibition (e.g. reticence and a lack of self-assurance). The letter D stands for "distressed".

== Characteristics ==
Individuals with a Type D personality have the tendency to experience increased negative emotions across time and situations and tend not to share these emotions with others, because of fear of rejection or disapproval. Johan Denollet, professor of Medical Psychology at Tilburg University, Tilburg, The Netherlands, developed the construct in the 1990s based on clinical observations in cardiac patients, empirical evidence, and existing theories of personality. The prevalence of Type D personality is 21% in the general population and ranges between 18% and 53% in cardiac patients. Type D has also been addressed with respect to common somatic complaints in childhood. Type D is distinct from a psychiatric disorder such as clinical depression; rather, Type D refers to normal personality traits, and those with a Type D personality do not necessarily meet the diagnostic threshold for depression, though the two can be co-occurring.

=== Risk factor in cardiovascular disease patients ===
Early studies focused on coronary artery disease (CAD) patients, finding that those with a Type D personality had a worse prognosis following a myocardial infarction (MI) as compared to patients without a Type D personality. In some of these studies, Type D was associated with a 4-fold increased risk of mortality, recurrent MI, or sudden cardiac death, independently of traditional risk factors, such as disease severity. However, a number of subsequent, larger scale studies have failed to replicate these findings. Consequently, some researchers have argued that these earlier, small (and therefore potentially statistically underpowered) studies that appeared to link Type D personality to mortality in CAD and CVD patients may have inadvertently reached exaggerated or false conclusions. Indeed, a high-powered individual patient data meta-analysis including data from 19 previously published prospective cohort studies, involving more than 11.000 CVD patients, found evidence that Type D is not a risk factor for mortality in CVD patients, while strong evidence was found for Type D personality as a risk factor for the occurrence of adverse events during a median follow-up time of 48 months.

== Assessment ==
Type D personality can be assessed by means of a valid and reliable 14-item questionnaire, the Type D Scale (DS14). Seven items refer to negative affectivity, and seven items refer to social inhibition. People who score 10 points or more on both dimensions are classified as Type D. Both negative affectivity and social inhibition have been shown to be relatively stable traits across four years. The DS14 can be applied in clinical practice for the risk stratification of cardiac patients.

Various scholars have argued that the relation between Type D personality (high scores on negative affectivity and social inhibition) and an outcome can be conceptualised as a synergy between negative affectivity and social inhibition on the outcome of interest. Several methods have been used to statistically model the relation between Type D personality and an outcome measure. A crude distinction can be made between dimensional and typological approaches.

=== Personality group methods ===
Most earlier studies aimed to capture this synergistic effect by classifying people in a type D group when they score 10 or higher on both the NA and SI total scores and those with all other score patterns in a non-type D group. A variables classifying individuals in one of these two groups is then used in further statistical analysis. Various researchers have criticised this two-group method, not only for resulting in less statistical power but also for risking spurious type D effects. A four-group method was commonly applied to solve this issue by distinguishing individuals without Type D personality from those with high scores on either negative affectivity or social inhibition alone.

Two recent computer simulation studies showed that both the two-group and four-group methods can indicate that Type D personality is related to an outcome, when in reality only one of the underlying personality traits was causally driving the effect. For instance, in some of these simulated data, only one personality trait (e.g., only negative affectivity) was causally related to an outcome. Analysing such data with the two-group and four-group methods often produced statistically significant effects of the type D group compared with the other groups, while no differences on the outcome are expected between those with Type D personality and those with only high negative affectivity. These simulation findings imply that estimated type D effects based on two or four personality groups cannot distinguish a causal effect of type D personality from an effect of only one of the underlying personality traits negative affectivity or social inhibition.

=== Continuous interaction method ===
The continuous interaction method does not classify individuals in personality groups, but includes the negative affectivity and social inhibition scores as predictors in the statistical model. The interaction effect between negative affectivity and social inhibition is then tested to investigate whether the two personality traits synergistically affect an outcome. If there is an interaction effect between negative affectivity and social inhibition on the outcome, then the effect of these traits is not constant, but the effect of one trait changes across scores on the other trait. If the interaction effect is positive, then the effect of one trait on the outcome increases for higher scores on the other trait. Such a positive interaction effect would be an example of synergy between negative affectivity and social inhibition because higher scores on both traits result in increasingly higher predicted values on the outcome measure. A negative interaction effects would not represent a synergistic effect because then the effect of one personality trait on the outcome decreases with higher scores on the other trait. Recent simulation studies have shown that the continuous interaction method is able to distinguish effects of type D personality from an effect of only one of the personality traits negative affectivity or social inhibition. When testing interaction effects between correlated continuous variables, it is recommended to investigate the potential non-linear effects of negative affectivity and social inhibition on the outcome measure, because not including true non-linear effects in the model can cause spurious interaction effects. Ideally the continuous interaction method is modeled within a structural equation model to filter out individual differences due to measurement error when estimating the interaction between the latent variables negative affectivity and social inhibition.

== See also ==
- Neuroticism
- Psychosomatic medicine
- Type A and Type B personality theory
