= Self-parenting =

Self-parenting is a paradigm that explains the characteristic interaction between the two voices having conversation inside a person's mind.

The idea of self-parenting is that a person's "mind" is created in the form of a conversation between two voices generated by the two parts of the cerebral hemisphere. One is the "inner parent" represented by the left brain with the other voice being the "inner child" represented by the right brain. The manner and quality by which these "inner conversations" take place between the two voices is most accurately described as self-parenting. The inner parent is parenting the inner child within the inner conversations.|

Another way of seeing self-parenting through a different perspective is first off knowing that usually some individuals are not strong when it comes to dealing with problems with their inner self; they usually need a mentor with positive feedback, there to guide them with certain strategies and most of all to overcome obstacles. Most of the time when they are in need to dealing with the forces of reality, they may place too much pressure on certain people.

The individual quality of a person's self-parenting style is said to closely resemble the specific style of parenting they received growing up as child.
