= Maturation and environmentalism =

Maturation is a guiding notion in educational theory that argues children will develop their cognitive skills innately, with little influence from their environment. Environmentalism, closely related to behaviorism, is the opposite view, that children acquire cognitive skills and behaviors from their surroundings and environment.

Psychologists have studied the development of infants through various topics and have found support for both maturation and environmentalism. Two of the most commonly studied topics are: i) infant crawling and: ii) infant language learning. Psychologists have found evidence supporting both the maturation theory and environmentalism theory when investigating each of these topics.

== Infant crawling ==
This video clip shows a visual cliff made for rats. The checkered material is the shallow area. The area not containing the checkered material is the deep area. Rats crossing this boundary experience the illusion of a drop in height.

One of the most common apparatus used by psychologists to study infant crawling is the visual cliff. This cliff was first used with different types of animals as well as infants to measure depth perception. Organisms are placed on a raised glass board. Under the glass, material is placed to give the effect of a floor on one side of the apparatus. On the other side, the material is taken away to give the effect of a drop, and a deep side. When infants are placed on this apparatus, psychologists can study whether or not these infants, or other animals, have gained the skills needed to understand that the visual drop is dangerous, or if they still cross the drop point. If young infants can avoid the experimental drop while crawling, researchers can assume that the aversion to cliffs is innately learned, not learned through crawling experience or teaching.

=== Arguments for maturation ===
In one study, it was found that the age an infant begins crawling, and not the crawling experience of an infant, determined whether they would cross or avoid the visual cliff. The infants with a later crawling start date avoided the cliff significantly more than infants with an earlier crawling start date. These observations indicate that there is a biological time clock that is intuitively teaching infants about depth avoidance, rather than crawling experience teaching them about avoidance. These conclusions are consistent with maturation theory. In another study, psychologists found that the crawling experience negatively affected infants who could not yet walk and were placed in walkers on the virtual cliff. In this study, too, the age when crawling began was a better indicator of whether the infant would avoid the cliff rather than his or her crawling experience. This lends evidence to the theory of maturation and innate age related steps in development, rather than external factors.

=== Arguments for environmentalism ===
Studies using a real water visual cliff found that infants with greater crawling experience had an easier time avoiding the cliff than those with less experience. A water cliff is a visual cliff with water in the deep end of the apparatus, and can measure an infant's potential perception of danger, as well as sensitivity to water. The results indicating that crawling experience was a greater indicator of avoidance align with the environmentalism theory in that infants learn through experiences with their environment. Additionally, researchers have also observed that infants who have learnt avoidance through crawling carried this avoidance over to when they start walking, rather than having to relearn these skills. These carryover effects indicate that infants are learning and processing through interactions with their environment and can apply their learnings to other new situations.

=== Mixed results ===
It has also been observed that a mother's emotions, seen through facial expression, can sometimes regulate an infant's behavior. Infants were placed on a visual cliff with a clear drop, and were able to see their mothers' facial expressions. When the mothers expressed fear, fewer infants crossed the cliff, indicating that the mothers' expressions had an effect on their behavior, supporting the environmentalism theory. However, when infants were placed on a visual cliff with a hidden drop, many infants crossed regardless of their mothers' facial expressions. This lends credence to the maturation theory; infants innately understand crawling and do not take cues from their surroundings.

== Language learning ==
While specific alphabets, grammar, and sounds might differ in different regions of the world, language is a universal form of communication within all societies, with all infants learning how to speak early in their lives. However, there has been much debate on how children acquire their language skills. More specifically, psychologists have argued about whether the skills of learning a language are innate within all humans, consistent with the maturation theory, or are learned through societal teaching practices, consistent with the theory of environmentalism.

=== Arguments for maturation ===
Infants are usually thought to be quick language learners, as people believe that children have implicit abilities to learn languages, whereas adults learning a language must use explicit instruction to obtain proficiency. However, it was found that if given explicit instructions, both children and adults learn new languages effectively. This finding endorse the reasoning that children have inherent abilities to learn languages that are not influenced by the environment. However, these inherent abilities to learn languages can be developed into even stronger skills with help from the environment.

=== Arguments for environmentalism ===
One way to examine the potential effect of the environment on the language abilities of children is to study the effects of day care environments on language learning skills. If young children spend a significant portion of their formative years in day care, and if the environment influences their ability to learn language, then there should be a correlation between the quality of day care and language abilities. Psychologists studying this relationship found that the quality of day cares, as well as the language skills of the day care providers are large predictors of children's language ability. Children in higher quality day care locations had much stronger language abilities. This evidence strongly supports the environmental theory that argues factors in a child's environment affect their development and language abilities. Additionally, the longer an infant or child experiences better care during their formative years, the stronger its language skills will be. Parent's responsiveness to children can also help facilitate language and vocabulary growth.

==== Environmentalism and behavioral interventions ====
In children with language development problems and behavioral disorders, parent behavioral interventions and speech therapy interventions have also been shown to significantly improve language development in young children. Parental influence can change and dictate young children language skills, an improvement that would not be seen from just internal maturation factors alone.

== See also ==
- Nature vs. nurture
- Hereditarianism
