= Structural ritualization theory =

Structural ritualization theory (SRT), a concept related to the fields of sociology and social psychology, emphasizes embedded groups. These are groups located in a larger environment. The taken-for-granted practices of people in these groups are similar to patterns of behavior in the larger environment. When routinely performed, their actions acquire symbolic significance. They become part of a cognitive script that dictates behavior. The members of embedded groups do not just copy the practices. They express them in ways that may confirm patterns of behavior in the larger environment. In other words, the larger environment feeds the embedded group.

== Ritualized symbolic practices ==
With the theory, ritualized symbolic practices (RSPs) are socially standardized actions that are schema-driven. The term schema refers to a cognitive structure or framework. According to the theory, ritual actions shape an actor's thoughts. This helps structural reproduction take place in specific domains of interaction. A domain of interaction is a bounded social arena which contains two or more actors engaged in face-to-face interaction

== Structural reproduction ==
Four factors play an essential role in structural reproduction involving RSPs. They include repetitiveness, salience, homologousness, and resources. Repetitiveness entails the frequency with which an RSP is performed. Salience involves the degree to which an RSP is perceived to be central to an act, action sequence, or bundle of interrelated acts. Homologousness implies a similarity among different RSPs. Resources are materials needed to engage in RSPs which are available to actors. The greater the availability of resources, the more likely an actor will engage in an RSP. Rank is important for analysis. It involves the standing of an RSP in terms of its dominance as measured by the four factors. In other words, a RSP has high rank if it happens often, is important, the same as other rituals, and people have the tangible and/or intangible tools needed to participate.

== Ritual as a missing link ==
With SRT, analysts argue that rituals are an overlooked missing link that can help behavioral and social scientists understand causes and consequences of actions. Structural reproduction occurs everyday throughout the world. Moreover, the strategic use of RSPs is a powerful tool that allows people to cope in situations involving life disruption, both on collective and personal levels. Evidence supporting these ideas focuses on locations such as schools, nursing homes, corporations, refugee and concentration camps, courts, prisons, disaster areas, and war zones. Virtual environments apply as well. Also consider themes involving deviance, crime, ecological degradation, leadership, group solidarity and emotion, gender, ethnic identity, and grief.
