= Obsessive relational intrusion =

Invading privacy

Obsessive relational intrusion (ORI) occurs when someone knowingly and repeatedly invades another person's privacy boundaries by using intrusive tactics to try to get closer to that person. It includes behaviors such as repeated calls and texts, malicious contact, spreading rumors, stalking, and violence (kidnapping and assault).

Drs. Brian Spitzberg and William Cupach, the creators of the term, define ORI as "repeated and unwanted pursuit and invasion of one's sense of physical or symbolic privacy by another person, either stranger or acquaintance, who desires and/or presumes an intimate relationship". Some victims of ORI have no preexisting relationship with or interest in their pursuers; others know their pursuers, but are less interested in making an existing relationship more intimate.

== Components ==
There are several key components of ORI that distinguish it from other similar relational patterns.

First, ORI involves a lack of mutual agreement regarding the nature or even the existence of a relationship. While the person obsessed with the relationship is attempting to make a closer connection, the object of ORI desires freedom from continued forced contact. Spitzberg writes that "this dialectical tension is endemic to the formation and ongoing construction of all interpersonal relationships".

Second, ORI is not associated with a singular event, but is repeated. Spitzberg and Cupach write, "Obsessiveness is reflected in the fact that the intruder is fixated on the target of attention; the intruder's thoughts and behaviors are persistent, preoccupying, and often morbid. Pursuit is persistent despite the absence of reciprocity by the obsessional object and despite resistance by the object." The episodes of unwanted behavior tend to escalate over time, with the seriousness rising and the time between incidents shortening.

Third, the intrusion can be symbolic and psychological, not just physical. The invasion of privacy as well as the imposition on the victim's feelings of freedom of choice are important aspects of ORI.

== Behaviors ==
Studies have been done to explore certain factors that predispose individuals to ORI. Some have found narcissism and low empathy as predictors for ORI, and hypothesized that people with high empathy would be more inclined to judge ORI behaviors as unacceptable. But this pattern has been found inconclusive; one study found that empathy may not inhibit ORI, although there is a substantial positive relationship between narcissism and the acceptability of ORI.

Many victims of ORI have also experienced sexual coercion, and the coping responses used for both tend to be similar. Additionally, the more serious the intrusion (for example, violence), the more formal the coping response (for example, calling the police).

ORI behavior, as well as non-ORI sexually coercive behavior, can involve types of coercion identified as deception coercion, mild force coercion, psychological coercion and severe force coercion.

== Stalking ==
Stalking, a severe form of ORI, is typically defined as "the willful, malicious, and repeated following and harassing of another persons that threatens his or her safety".

=== Connection between ORI and stalking ===
Spitzberg and Cupach state more research is needed to correctly capture the connection, but ORI and stalking are pervasive and impactful occurrences. A clearer picture is needed to better understand the incidence, prevalence and consequences of ORI and stalking. Better understanding will provide improvements in prevention, intervention and treatment of offenders and victims.

== Authors ==
The authors Brian Spitzberg and William Cupach developed ORI in 1998, and published their research in their book The Dark Side of Close Relationships.

== Social theory use of ORI ==
=== Relational Goal Pursuit Theory ===
According to the Relational Goal Pursuit Theory (RGPT), people expend energy to develop or reinitiate relationships to the extent that they perceive a relationship desirable and attainable. It becomes all about achieving the goal of a relationship. ORI occurs when people continue to believe that a relationship is attainable even though it is not. The pursuer begins to escalate when they meet challenges to their goal. RGPT identifies processes that conspire to transform otherwise normal relationships into ORI and stalking. All relationships begin with a goal to pursuit. The following are some rules:

1. Obsessive pursuers link the relationship to higher order goals, such as happiness and self-worth
2. This linking results in exaggerated positive attitudes regarding the success of the relational goal
3. There is an exaggerated positive attitude regarding the success of the relational goal
4. Linking also produces exaggerated negative attitudes towards failure of the relational goal
5. This failure produces heightened negative emotions
6. The linking renders goal abandonment as unlikely
7. These exaggerated attitudes reinforce the importance of the relational goal
8. The strength of the attitudes can predict persistence

== Other reasons for ORI use ==
Cultural scripts – if people play hard to get enough, eventually win the affection of person trying to love – usually work against the realization that the relationship is unattainable.

Ambiguous communication – initiation, reinitiating and rejection of relationships may keep hope alive. Using indirect signals to reject people because they are worried about hurting their feelings, pursuers usually interpret this incorrectly.

Rumination – when people can't obtain a goal, they tend to fixate on the problem and pursuers redouble their efforts.

Shift in motivation – when pursuer moves from desire to revenge from a feeling of being humiliated. This shift usually marks the beginning of more aggressive behaviors.

== ORI and Facebook ==
With the increase of Facebook and other social media tools designed to make us more accessible to others while taking away pieces of our privacy, ORI has become easier in an online world. There is relational intrusion from both offenders and targets in five different categories:

1. Primary contact attempts
2. Secondary contact attempts
3. Monitoring or surveillance
4. Expressions
5. Invitations

Online social media helps to facilitate behaviors indicative of ORI and these behaviors have consequences for users on their privacy and security.
