= Trollope ploy =

Negotiation technique

A Trollope ploy is a negotiation technique named after an incident from an Anthony Trollope novel, in which a woman interprets a casual romantic gesture, such as squeezing her hand, as a marriage proposal.

== Manipulation of involved parties ==
The term is used to describe a situation in which a proposal from a "proposing" party is deliberately misinterpreted by a "responding" party in such a way that it is more to the responding party's liking. The responding party then communicates their (usually laudatory) acceptance of the incorrect interpretation of the proposal. The proposing party must then either accept the agreement to the incorrect interpretation, although it is not the proposal they had intended to make, or they must object and attempt to explain their initial proposal, remedying the misunderstanding. Given that the party responding to the proposal has already deliberately misinterpreted a proposal, further attempts to feign an inability to understand usually follow, assuming they are able to do so without making it clear that they are deliberately frustrating matters.

The purpose of this technique is to pressure the proposing party into accepting the deliberately misinterpreted proposal by forcing them to choose between acceptance and cordiality or rejection of the responding party's ostensibly friendly gestures.

This technique is often employed when the proposing party is judged to be unable to state their objections to the misinterpretation, unable to refuse friendly gestures, easily frustrated, or otherwise susceptible to this type of manipulation.

== Manipulation of casual observers ==
Another benefit of the technique is its psychological effects upon outside, casual observers. When the proposals being discussed are complicated, the responding party can merely act as if the misinterpretation was what was agreed on. After this impression is instilled in casual observers, attempts to explain the errors of the perceived agreement can be portrayed as attempts to renege on the agreement. Even if the impression that there has been an agreement is not achieved, the impression that the misinterpretation was the correct interpretation is still powerful, as any attempt to explain the errors of the misinterpretation can be portrayed as being a retraction of the proposal, thereby allowing the responding party to call into question the sincerity of the proposing party. This benefit is often exploited by governments, corporations, and powerful individuals since they are often able to influence journalists, thereby controlling the public's perception of the negotiations taking place.

== Use in the Cuban Missile Crisis ==
The term is sometimes used to denote President John F. Kennedy's response to Soviet Chairman Khrushchev's offers during the final days of the Cuban Missile Crisis. On October 26, 1962, Kennedy received a private letter from Khrushchev in which Khrushchev offered to remove Soviet missiles from Cuba in return for a pledge from the U.S. not to invade the island. The next morning, Khrushchev made a public offer on Moscow radio, conditioning removal of the missiles from Cuba on the removal of NATO nuclear missiles in Turkey. After much discussion with his advisers (and particularly at the urging of adviser McGeorge Bundy and brother Robert Kennedy), Kennedy publicized Khrushchev's first offer and accepted it, while just barely acknowledging the receipt of the second one. (This was the Trollope ploy component.) Behind the scenes, however, Kennedy explained to Khrushchev that he is willing to remove the missiles from Turkey, but could not do it publicly or during the crisis, out of concern over domestic opinion and possible feelings of betrayal from NATO allies. Instead, Kennedy promised to remove the Turkish missiles in "four or five months". Khrushchev agreed to this arrangement. The nature of the deal was not revealed to the public until the 1980s.
