= Process psychology =

Branch of psychology

Process psychology is a branch of psychotherapeutic psychology which was derived from process philosophy as developed by Alfred North Whitehead. Process psychology got its start at a conference sponsored by the Center for Process Studies in 1998. In 2000, Michel Weber created the Whitehead Psychology Nexus: an open forum dedicated to the cross-examination of Alfred North Whitehead's process philosophy and the various facets of the contemporary psychological field.

David Ray Griffin, a retired professor, has also been instrumental in encouraging the development of Process Psychology. Process Psychology is closely aligned with process theology and its practitioners frequently refer to spiritual concerns. John Buchanan described Process Psychology as a transpersonal psychology providing an empirical basis for what has been called mystical experience.

Yet other theorists reference systems thinking and the work of Ludwig von Bertalanffy whose concept of a "system" is compared to Whitehead's idea of the "organism".

The influence of Carl G. Jung is also referenced and he is considered to be among the discipline's founding fathers.

Jon Mills (psychologist) has proposed a process psychology known as "dialectical psychoanalysis" (which is based, in part, on Hegelianism).
