= Jenkins Activity Survey =

Psychological assessment tool

Within human psychology, the Jenkins Activity Survey (JAS) is one of the most widely used methods of assessing Type A behavior. The Jenkins Activity Survey is a psychometric survey of behavior and attitude designed to identify persons showing signs of Type A behavior. The test is multiple choice and self-administered. It was published in 1979 by C. David Jenkins, Stephen Zyzanski, and Ray Rosenman. The terms Type A and Type B personality were originally described in the work of Rosenman and Friedman in 1959. The Jenkins Activity Survey was developed in an attempt to duplicate the clinical assessment of the Type A behavior pattern by employing an objective psychometric procedure. Individuals displaying a Type A behavior pattern are characterized by extremes of competitiveness, striving for achievement and personal recognition, aggressiveness, haste, impatience, explosiveness and loudness in speech, characteristics which the Jenkins Activity Survey attempts to measure. A popular sub-form of the Jenkins Activity Survey is form T, created to analyze Type A and Type B behavior in students as opposed to the original survey created with questions pertaining to the workforce.

The JAS was initially developed as a self-report alternative to the structured interview to assess the Type A behavior pattern, which was considered a key risk factor for coronary heart disease (CHD). The questionnaire allowed researchers to quantify the competitive, impatient, and achievement-driven tendencies that are usually possessed by Type A individuals, so as to eliminate the need for time-consuming interviews in a cost effective way. Its application in large-scale epidemiological studies increased during the late 20th century due to its simplicity of administration and standardised scoring. The JAS was created using data from the 1965 and 1966 Western Collaborative Group Study.

== Forms ==
Over time, multiple forms of the JAS were developed in order to be suitable for different populations. The original version, Form A, was used primarily in validation research and was subsequently replaced by Form B, a version with 54 questions adapted for broader occupational contexts. The JAS consists of 54 self-report items measuring Type A tendencies and four key sections and scales: Type A with 21 items, S (Speed and Impatience) with 21 items, J (Job Involvement) with 24 items, and H (Hard-Driving Competitiveness) with 20 items. Several items overlap within two or more of the scales, yet contain different impacts in differing scales. The type A scale was developed based on the items that most successfully categorized participants between those who scored Type A and Type B in previous research. Form C became the most widely used version with 52 questions, yet is almost identical to Form B as it had only two questions that were not included.

Form T of the Jenkins activity survey is a subform of the original Jenkins activity survey that utilizes the same methods and procedures as the Jenkins activity survey Form B, the adult version, but with questions altered to relate to student life as opposed to questions relating to occupational work (Bishop, 1989). This form was created in 1974 by Krantz, Glass, and Snyder to distinguish between Type A and Type B students and the differences among them relating to their school performance as well as gender differences and countless others.

== Applications and research use ==
The JAS has been applied across various fields, including health psychology, education, and occupational studies. Originally in its early use, the JAS featured prominently in cardiovascular research. For instance, Jenkins et al. (1971) and Rosenman (1975) used the survey to assess Type A patterns in the Western Collaborative Group Study, attempting to associate behavior to heart disease risk. Although subsequent research questioned this correlation, the JAS remained to be a useful measurement in identifying personality traits across large samples of respondents.

In educational settings, Form T has been used to see the effect of Type A behavior on academic stress and performance. Rainey (1985) found that Type A respondents obtained higher GPAs than Type B respondents, while Type A participants also desired higher GPAs. Researchers also analyzed gender-based differences, finding that female students score higher on competitiveness sub-scales.

In occupational contexts, the JAS has been used in order to investigate stress, productivity, and job satisfaction levels. In regards to JAS scores of women with differing occupations, Morell and Katkin (1982) found that individuals with Type A scores were highest among female professionals than educated homemakers.

== Psychometric properties ==
The JAS has been widely studied with regard to its reliability and validity. Yarnold et al. (1986) found that the student version (Form T) illustrated moderate internal consistency and a greater level of reliability among varying demographic groups. They also proclaimed strong test–retest reliability over two-week and three-month intervals, implying that the JAS captures relatively stable traits over these durations. This form has been used in research not only to find information from students (Rainey, 1985) but also to test the reliability of Form T and subsequently the Jenkins Activity Survey as a whole (Bishop, 1989).

Testing the reliability of this form is fundamental because although the changes made from the original survey were minor they could still have large effects in the overall scores and findings of the research. Research conducted by Bishop, Hailey, and O’Rourke in 1989 built off of previous research through using scores of those that were not found to be strongly Type A or Type B. In these cases, individuals who scored one standard deviation above the mean were classified as Type A and those one standard deviation below Type B. In this research, that utilized a test-retest approach, they were able to find reliable and statistically significant correlations between the first test and subsequent tests administered at the beginning of each of four semesters. These findings conclude the reliability of the test and add to other findings of the reliability of the overall Jenkins activity survey.

However, several researchers have indicated the limitations of the survey due to its psychometric properties as a whole. Myrtek and Greenlee (1984) observed that the JAS showcases a considerably low stability upon retest as it fails to showcase adequate internal consistency in certain samples. This inconsistency raises concerns for its use in clinical or diagnostic environments. Moreover, correlations between the JAS and the structured interview, the original method for identifying Type A behaviours, have also been weak with Chesney et al. (1981) having found only moderate agreement between the two measures.

Some researchers have also scrutinised the validity of the JAS as while it does correspond with observable characteristics of the Type A pattern, such as competitiveness and impatience, it has limited predictive power in health outcomes. Appels et al. (1987), in a longitudinal study of over 3,000 men, illustrated that JAS scores failed to predict heart attacks over a 9.5-year period. Similarly, Šmigelskas et al. (2014) concluded that Type A traits measured by the JAS were not significantly associated with cardiovascular or all-cause mortality, and challenged the validity of the JAS and asserted that it possesses low reliability and should not be used for predictive purposes. This undermines the JAS’s original role as a coronary risk screening tool. Further research by Pred, Spence, and Helmreich (1986) suggested how the Type A construct is multidimensional. They suggested two subcomponents in the JAS: Achievement Strivings and Impatience-Irritability, can have different effects for health and behavior.

== Criticisms and contemporary relevance ==
The JAS has been the subject of severe criticism, especially in terms of predictive validity and theoretical clarity. While initial studies suggested a link between Type A behavior and coronary heart disease, more recent research has largely discredited this. Šmigelskas et al. (2014) found that Type A behavior was unable to predict premature mortality, which undermined one of the foundational assumptions of the JAS. Similarly, Rose (1987) displayed that the disparate findings across studies called for a reconceptualization of the Type A construct, which led to researchers analysing traits such as hostility and anger, that are more reliable predictors for coronary artery disease. There are also concerns about cultural and gender bias. Hayano et al. (1989) demonstrated that cultural context may influence how Type A traits are expressed, with Japanese participants job involvement items did not indicate position or pay rises as opposed to their American counterparts.

Although the JAS is no longer widely used in contemporary clinical practice, the JAS is still referenced in academic research and has historical importance in the development of personality-health psychology. It prompted greater investigation into relations between behavior patterns and stress and health outcomes (specifically for coronary heart disease), and contributed to the improvement of psychometric assessments in personality psychology.

== See also ==
- Personality test
- Psychometrics
