= Emcas =

British financial claims management company

EMCAS
- Company type: Public company
- Industry: Claims management
- Founded: 2003
- Defunct: 2019
- Fate: Administration
- Headquarters: Exeter, United Kingdom
- Products: PPI Claims, Endowment Mortgage Claims, Investment Claims, Packaged Bank Account Claims
- Number of employees: 80
- Website: www.emcasclaims.co.uk

EMCAS was a British Financial Claims Management Company based in Torquay, with offices in Exeter, Paignton and Taunton.

At its peak, EMCAS was one of the largest Claims Management Companies in the UK, employing over 350 staff. It focused on helping consumers claim back money lost from mis-sold financial products including savings and investments, endowment mortgages, pensions and payment protection insurance (PPI).

In 2013, they were added to the London Stock Exchange Group's list of '1,000 Companies to Inspire Britain'. The company went into administration in 2019 and all employees were made redundant.

== History ==
Established in Torquay in 2003 as EMC, they started out focusing on helping those who had been erroneously sold Endowment Mortgages or lost money through unfair bank charges. In 2007 they outgrew their Torquay office and relocated to Paignton. By 2009 they had reclaimed £100 million on behalf of their customers.

Following a rebrand in 2011, EMCAS received a private equity investment from Lonsdale Capital Partners, supporting their management team led by CEO Craig Bernhardt and CFO James Scarth. In May 2011, EMCAS opened a call centre in Exeter Business Park, creating more than 30 new jobs for the local area.

By November 2012, EMCAS had further expanded and opened an office in Taunton, Somerset. The office is located in East Reach House, the former Taunton and Somerset Hospital.

In 2013, EMCAS entered a sponsorship deal with English rugby union club Exeter Chiefs, and the EMCAS logo appeared on the rear of the club's shirts.

In October 2014, the company was fined £70,000 by the Information Commissioner's Office for making unsolicited calls.

On 26 April 2019 the company went in to administration with all staff made redundant with immediate effect.
