= Face-ism =

Face-ism or facial prominence is the relative proportion of the face compared to the body in the portrayal of men and women. The media tends to give higher proportion to men's faces and women's bodies.

== Origin and evidence ==
Illustration of calculation of face-ism index on two crops of the Mona Lisa.

The term "face-ism" or "facial prominence" was initially defined in a 1983 study in which facial prominence was measured by a "Face-ism index", which is the ratio of two linear measurements, with the distance (in millimeters or any other unit) from the top of the head to the lowest visible point of the chin being the numerator and the distance from the top of the head to the lowest visible part of the subject's body the denominator. It was found that across societies and time, facial prominence of men has been much higher than that of women.

Subsequent studies have generated consistent findings and thus helped confirm the pervasive presence of face-ism. For instance, a prevalent face-ism phenomenon was observed in news magazines and women's magazines of the 1970s and 1980s. Face-ism has been documented in prime-time television programs. Evidence has been shown that face-ism is still present in mainstream printed media from as recently as 2004, and showed that men in intellectually focused occupations tend to have higher face-to-body ratios than women in similar professions, while women in physical occupations tend to have higher face-to-body ratios than men in similar professions. A cross-cultural study on face-ism found that face-ism in photographs of politicians is more pronounced in gender-egalitarian societies compared to gender-unequal societies.

There is no relation between face-ism and the perception of intellect.

== Implications ==
It was found that regardless of gender difference, news photographs featuring high face prominence tend to generate more positive ratings with regard to intelligence, ambition and physical appearance than those with low face prominence.

Similarly, another study argued that as a series of mental life dimensions including intelligence, personality, and character, are closely associated with the face and head. Higher face-ism of men may convey impressions of greater intelligence, dominance, and control. In contrast, the greater body-ism of women (analyzed in television beer commercials) serves to reinforce the stereotypical images of women as trophies or sex objects without personalities.

Face-ism may not be merely restricted to gender differences but can apply to racial difference as well. For instance, the study revealed that Caucasians have higher face-ism than blacks across different media types.

== See also ==
- Advertising
- Gender
- Media bias
- Sexism
- Stereotypes
