= Transduction (psychology) =

In psychology, transduction refers to reasoning from specific cases to general cases, typically employed by children during their development. The word has many specialized definitions in varying fields. Furthermore, transduction is defined as what takes place when many sensors in the body convert physical signals from the environment into encoded neural signals sent to the central nervous system.

== Sensation and perception ==
The five senses, vision, hearing, touch and taste/smell allow physical stimulation around us to turn to neural stimulation which is sent to the brain. Vision is from light reflecting off objects around us, hearing is from the vibrations caused by change in air pressure, touch is from the signals in our skin feeling the pressure of objects touching us and taste/smell is from the molecules in the air or in our saliva that let us know what we are smelling or tasting. Cyclic guanosine monophosphate (cGMP) plays an important role in visual transductions. This fact was well rooted when Fesenko demonstrated that this nucleotide cGMP was able to directly regulate a new assort of membrane channels now called the nucleotide-gated cation channels. This was how the route from the light to a change in the rod receptor membrane conductance was conclusively organized in the twentieth century and has been represented in more insightful detail over the past ten years.

== Etymology ==
The etymological origin of the word transduction has been attested since the 17th century (during the flourishing of Neo-Latin, Latin vocabulary words used in scholarly and scientific contexts) from the Latin noun transductionem, derived from transducere/traducere "to change over, convert," a verb which itself originally meant "to lead along or across, transfer," from trans- "across" + ducere "to lead."

The verb form of this term in English, transduce, was created by back-formation in the 20th century.

== In physiology as relates to psychology ==
Transduction in physiology also has a meaning that relates to psychology when discussing the biological origins of the mind: that is, transduction meaning the transportation of stimuli to the central nervous system, when physical signals from the environment are transformed into electrical or neural signals. Receptor cells produce an electrical change in response to a physical stimulus.
