= Multnomah Community Ability Scale =

Standardized mental health assessment

The Multnomah Community Ability Scale is a standardized mental health assessment which scores several different axes of functionality independently. The test was originally developed in Multnomah County, Oregon, whose name it still bears. The MCAS is a common tool in assessing progress on treatment goals, as it is more in-depth than the more simplified GAF scale.
