= Type A and Type B personality theory =

Personality hypothesis which describes two contrasting personality types

The Type A and Type B personality theory associates two contrasting personality types with different incidence of coronary heart disease. According to the theory, people who are habitually competitive and impatient are labeled Type A, while more relaxed people are labeled Type B. While it was widely discussed in early health psychology research, the theory is now mostly considered historical and is not commonly used in modern personality psychology. Cardiologists Meyer Friedman and Ray Rosenman, who developed the theory, came to believe that Type A personalities have a significantly greater heart disease risk. Following the results of further studies and considerable controversy about the role of the tobacco industry funding of early research in this area, some reject, either partially or completely, the link between Type A personality and coronary disease. Nevertheless, this research had a significant effect on the development of the health psychology field, in which psychologists look at how an individual's mental state affects physical health.

== History ==
Type A personality behavior was first described as a potential risk factor for heart disease in the 1950s by cardiologists Meyer Friedman and Ray Rosenman. They credit their insight to an upholsterer who called to their attention the peculiar fact that the chairs in their waiting rooms were worn out only on the arms and on the front edge of the seat. This suggested to Friedman and Rosenman that their patients were getting up from the chairs frequently and were otherwise waiting anxiously. After an eight-and-a-half-year-long study of healthy men between the ages of 35 and 59, Friedman and Rosenman estimated that Type A behavior more than doubled the risk of coronary heart disease in otherwise healthy individuals. The individuals enrolled in this study were followed well beyond the original time frame of the study. Participants were asked to fill out a questionnaire, that asked questions like "Do you feel guilty if you use spare time to relax?" and "Do you generally move, walk, and eat rapidly?" Subsequent analysis indicated that although Type A personality is associated with the incidence of coronary heart disease, it does not seem to be a risk factor for mortality. It was originally called 'Type A Personality' by Friedman and Roseman who defined it as "an action-emotion complex that can be observed in any person who is aggressively involved in a chronic incessant struggle to achieve more and more in less and less time, and if required to do so, against the opposing efforts of other things or other persons." It has now been conceptualized as the Type A behavior pattern.

Some contemporary psychologists argue that the Type A and Type B personality concept is outdated and oversimplified. A 1997 study found that Type A behavior, described by traits such as competitiveness and time urgency, could be correlated with higher scores for neuroticism and extraversion in the Five-Factor Model of personality. This suggests that a more nuanced understanding of personality traits is necessary. Further, the dimensional approach seen in the Five-Factor (Big Five) model has become one of the most widely accepted personality frameworks because it has demonstrated reliability across different populations and has broad applications in personality, health, educational, and organizational research.

Although the Type A and Type B personality concept is outdated, some social media users, particularly on TikTok, have started to use it to describe themselves and other users on the app. Non scientific personality types, such as this and the Myers-Briggs Type Indicator (MBTI), will often go "viral" due to users liking the easiness and comfort of identifying with them, even if the broadness allowing them to do that is their inherent flaw.

== The types ==
=== Type A ===
The hypothesis describes Type A individuals as outgoing, ambitious, rigidly organized, highly status-conscious, impatient, anxious, proactive, and concerned with time management. People with Type A personalities are often high-achieving workaholics. They push themselves with deadlines, and hate both delays and ambivalence. People with Type A personalities experience more job-related stress and less job satisfaction. They tend to set high expectations for themselves, and may believe others have these same high expectations of them as well. Interestingly, those with Type A personalities do not always outperform those with Type B personalities. Depending on the task and the individual's sense of time urgency and control, it can lead to poor results when there are complex decisions to be made. However, research has shown that Type A individuals are in general associated with higher performance and productivity. Moreover, Type A students tend to earn higher grades than Type B students, and Type-A faculty members were shown to be more productive than their Type B behavior counterparts (Taylor, Locke, Lee, & Gist, 1984).

In his 1996 book, Type A Behavior: Its Diagnosis and Treatment, Friedman suggests that dangerous Type A behavior is expressed through three major symptoms: (1) free-floating hostility, which can be triggered by even minor incidents; (2) time urgency and impatience, which causes irritation and exasperation usually described as being "short-fused"; and (3) a competitive drive, which causes stress and an achievement-driven mentality. The first of these symptoms is believed to be covert and therefore less observable, while the other two are more overt.

Type A people were said to be hasty, impatient, impulsive, hyperalert, potentially hostile, and angry. Research has also shown that Type A personalities may use certain defenses or ways of dealing with reality to avoid difficult realizations. For example, one study found that those with Type A personality are more likely to show higher levels of denial than Type B in stressful situations.

There are two main methods to assessing Type A behavior, the first being a structured interview (SI) developed by Friedman and Rosenman, and the second being the Jenkins Activity Survey (JAS). The SI assessment involves an interviewer's measuring a person's emotional, nonverbal, and verbal responses (expressive style). The JAS involves a self-questionnaire with three main categories: Speed and Impatience, Job Involvement, and Hard-Driving Competitiveness.

Individuals with Type A personalities have often been linked to higher rates of coronary heart disease, higher morbidity rates, and other undesirable physical outcomes due to their higher levels of stress, impatience, and competitiveness.

Early studies linked Type A behavior to heart disease, but later research found that this connection was overstated. More recent findings suggest that traits like hostility, anger, and chronic stress, rather than Type A, are more strongly linked to health risks. As a result, hostility is now considered the more important factor in understanding these outcomes. Today, the Type A and Type B framework is mainly discussed in historical and educational contexts rather than used as a primary tool in personality research.

=== Type B ===
Type B is a behavior pattern that is lacking in Type A behaviors. A-B personality is a continuum over which one either leans to be more Type A or Non Type A (Type B).

The hypothesis is that Type B individuals are noted to live at lower stress levels. They typically work steadily and may enjoy achievement, although they have a greater tendency to disregard physical or mental stress when they do not achieve. When faced with competition, they may focus less on winning or losing than their Type A counterparts, and more on enjoying the game regardless of winning or losing. Type B individuals are also more likely to have a poorer sense of time.

Type B personality types are more tolerant than individuals in the Type A category. This can be evident through their relationship style that members of upper management prefer. Type B individuals can "...see things from a global perspective, encourage teamwork, and exercise patience in decision making..."

Type B personality is generally described as being more relaxed and less competitive than Type A personality. People with Type B traits tend to be more patient, experience less time pressure, and are less likely to react to stress with anger or hostility. They are often described as easygoing and calm, especially in situations that might feel stressful to others.

In research, Type B personality is often discussed mainly as a comparison to Type A rather than as its own category. Type B individuals are not automatically healthier. However, some research has linked lower stress and hostility with better health outcomes. Today, many psychologists prefer modern personality models that look at traits on a spectrum instead of placing people into fixed categories like Type A or Type B.

=== Interactions between Type A and Type B ===
Type A individuals' proclivity for competition and aggression is illustrated in their interactions with other Type As and Type Bs. When playing a modified Prisoner's Dilemma game, Type A individuals elicited more competitiveness and angry feelings from both Type A and Type B opponents than did the Type B individuals. Type A individuals punished their Type A counterparts more than their Type B counterparts, and more than Type Bs punished other Type Bs. The rivalry between Type A individuals was shown by more aggressive behavior in their interactions, including initial antisocial responses, refusal to cooperate, verbal threats, and behavioral challenges.

A common misconception is that having a Type A personality is better than having a Type B personality. This largely comes into play in the workforce because people with Type A personalities are often viewed as very hardworking, highly motivated, and competitive, while Type B personalities often don't feel a sense of urgency to get projects completed and are more relaxed and easy-going. In reality, both personality types are required and bring their own set of strengths to the workplace.

== Criticism ==
Friedman et al. (1986) conducted a randomized controlled trial on 862 male and female post-myocardial infarction patients, ruling out (by probabilistic equivalence) diet and other confounds. Subjects in the control group received group cardiac counseling, and subjects in the treatment group received cardiac counseling plus Type-A counseling, and a comparison group received no group counseling of any kind. The recurrence rate was 21% in the control group and 13% in the treatment group, a strong and statistically significant (p < .005) finding, whereas the comparison group experienced a 28% recurrence rate. Later studies suggested that some cardiovascular risks associated with Type A behavior may be reduced through behavioral interventions, though the strength and interpretation of these findings have been debated in later research.

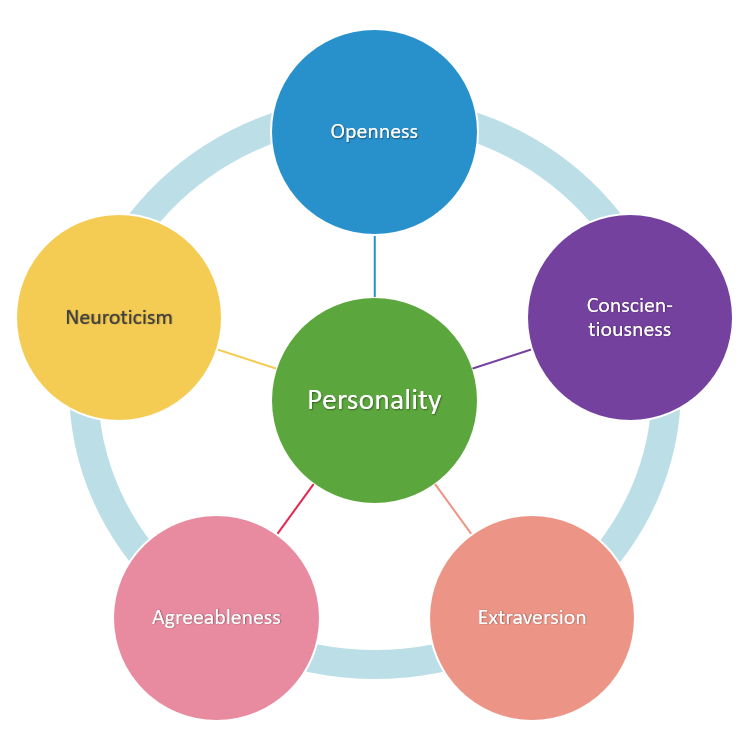
The Five-Factor (Big Five) Personality Traits

Although Type A and Type B personality theory was influential in early research, it is now considered limited by many psychologists. One major criticism is that the theory places people into fixed categories, which can oversimplify personality and ignore individual differences, as many individuals do not fit clearly into a single type.

Modern personality psychology tends to favor dimensional models, such as the Five-Factor (Big Five) model, which measure traits like conscientiousness, neuroticism, and agreeableness along continuous scales. This model became widely accepted because it has been replicated across many cultures and languages and allows psychologists to better capture individual differences and avoid oversimplifying personality into only two categories. It also expanded the ways that personality is studied in modern psychology. Researchers use the model to examine behavior in clinical, academic, corporate, and various other environments. Because of this shift, the Type A and Type B framework is rarely used in contemporary research and has limited predictive value for behavior or health outcomes today.

=== Table 1: Type A and Type B Personality Theory vs. Contemporary Model ===
Feature	Type A and Type B Personality Theory	Five-Factor (Big Five) Model
Approach	Classifies all people into two broad personality types	Measures personality for each individual across five continuous traits, with individuals varying in each trait
Personality structure	Type A; Type B	Openness; Conscientiousness; Extraversion; Agreeableness; Neuroticism
Focuses on	Competitive behavior, time urgency, hostility, stress, cardiovascular health (historically)	Broad pattern of thoughts, emotions, and behaviors across multiple domains
Modern use	Primarily discussed for its historical significance and influence on health psychology	One of the most widely used frameworks in contemporary personality research
Common applications	Historical studies of personality and cardiovascular disease	Personality assessment, clinical psychology, education, organizational psychology, research

=== Funding by tobacco companies ===
Further discrediting the so-called Type A Behavior Pattern (TABP), a study from 2012 – based on searching the Truth Tobacco Industry Documents – suggests the phenomenon of initially promising results followed by negative findings to be partly explained by the tobacco industry's involvement in TABP research to undermine the scientific evidence on smoking and health. Documents indicate that around 1959, the tobacco industry first became interested in the TABP when the Tobacco Institute Research Committee received an application for funding from New York University in order to investigate the relationship between smoking and personality. The industry's interest in TABP lasted at least four decades until the late 1990s, involving substantial funding to key researchers encouraged to prove smoking to simply correlate with a personality type prone to coronary heart disease (CHD) and cancer. Hence, until the early 1980s, the industry's strategy consisted of suggesting the risks of smoking to be caused by psychological characteristics of individual smokers rather than tobacco products by deeming the causes of cancer to be multifactorial with stress as a key contributing factor. Philip Morris (today Altria) and RJ Reynolds helped generate substantial evidence to support these claims by funding workshops and research aiming to educate about and alter TABP to reduce risks of CHD and cancer. Moreover, Philip Morris primarily funded the Meyer Friedman Institute, e.g. conducting the "crown-jewel" trial on the effectiveness of reducing TABP whose expected findings could discredit studies associating smoking with CHD and cancer but failing to control for Type A behavior.

In 1994, Friedman wrote to the US Occupational Safety and Health Administration criticising restrictions on indoor smoking to reduce CHD, claiming the evidence remained unreliable since it did not account for the significant confounder of Type A behavior, although by then, TABP had proven to be significant in only three of twelve studies. Though apparently unpaid for, this letter was approved by and blind-copied to Philip Morris, and Friedman (falsely) claimed to receive funding largely from the National Heart, Lung and Blood Institute.

When TABP finally became untenable, Philip Morris supported research on its hostility component, allowing Vice President Jetson Lincoln to explain passive smoking lethality by the stress exerted on a non-smoking spouse through media claiming the smoking spouse to be slowly killing themselves. When examining the most recent review on TABP and CHD in this light, the close relationship to the tobacco industry becomes evident: of thirteen etiologic studies in the review, only four reported positive findings, three of which had a direct or indirect link to the industry. Also on the whole most TABP studies had no relationship to the tobacco lobby but the majority of those with positive findings did. Furthermore, TABP was used as a litigation defence, similar to psychosocial stress. Hence, Petticrew et al. proved the tobacco industry to have substantially helped generate the scientific controversy on TABP, contributing to the (in lay circles) enduring popularity and prejudice for Type A personality even though it has been scientifically disproven.

=== Other issues ===
Some scholars argue that Type A behavior is not a good predictor of coronary heart disease. According to research by Redford Williams of Duke University, the hostility component of Type A personality is the only significant risk factor. Thus, it is a high level of expressed anger and hostility, not the other elements of Type A behavior, that constitutes the problem. Research done by Hecker et al. (1988) showed that the ‘hostility’ component of the Type A description was predictive of cardiac disease. As time continued, more research was conducted which focused on different components of type A behavior such as hostility, depression, and anxiety predicting cardiac disease.

The initial study that pointed to the association of Type A personality and heart attacks had a massive number of questions under consideration. When there are a lot of questions there is a high probability of a false positive. A study undertaken by the U.S. National Institute of Aging, Sardinian and Italian researchers, as well as bio-statisticians from the University of Michigan, had specifically tested for a direct relationship between coronary heart disease and Type A personalities, and the results had indicated that no such relation exists. A simple explanation is that the initial finding was chance due to multiple questions being under consideration.

Current research suggests that cardiovascular disease is influenced by several psychological factors rather than a single personality type. Chronic stress, anxiety, depression, and ineffective coping strategies have all been associated with poorer cardiovascular outcomes, and these can be further explored using dimensional models such as the Five-Factor (Big Five) model. Researchers now emphasize that these factors often interact with one another and with biological and lifestyle risk factors. As a result, current cardiovascular psychology generally takes a broader approach than the original Type A and Type B theory.

== Other studies ==
=== Cardiovascular disease ===
There have been a number of studies that have attempted to link various personality traits to cardiovascular disease risk.

Grossarth-Maticek and Eysenck published papers in the 1980s and 1990s tying personality to coronary heart disease (CHD) and cancer, and suggested that behavioral therapy reduces death rates from CHD and cancer by 80% to 100%. However, much of their research has been discredited in the modern era, and their therapy papers have been retracted.

A study conducted by the International Journal of Behavioral Medicine re-examined the association between the Type A concept with cardiovascular (CVD) and non-cardiovascular (non-CVD) mortality by using a long follow-up (on average 20.6 years) of a large population-based sample of elderly males (N = 2,682), by applying multiple Type A measures at baseline, and looking separately at early and later follow-up years. The study sample was the participants of the Kuopio Ischemic Heart Disease Risk Factor Study, (KIHD), which includes a randomly selected representative sample of Eastern Finnish men, aged 42–60 years at baseline in the 1980s. They were followed up until the end of 2011 through linkage with the National Death Registry. Four self-administered scales, Bortner Short Rating Scale, Framingham Type A Behavior Pattern Scale, Jenkins Activity Survey, and Finnish Type A Scale, were used for Type A assessment at the start of follow-up. Type A measures were inconsistently associated with cardiovascular mortality, and most associations were non-significant. Some scales suggested a slightly decreased, rather than increased, risk of CVD death during the follow-up. Associations with non-cardiovascular deaths were even weaker. The study's findings further suggest that there is no evidence to support the Type A as a risk factor for CVD and non-CVD mortality.

A recent study utilized the Five-Factor (Big Five) model to find that higher levels of neuroticism were associated with an increased risk of myocardial infarction. On the other hand, greater conscientiousness and extraversion were linked to lower risk. These findings suggest that specific personality traits may provide more useful information than the traditional Type A and Type B classification. The study once again reflects the broader shift toward dimensional models in personality and health psychology.

=== Substance use disorder ===
In a 1998 study done by Ball et al., they looked at differences in Type A and Type B personalities based on substance use. Their results showed that Type B personalities had more severe issues with substance use disorders than Type A personalities. Another discovery in their research was more Type B personalities had been diagnosed with a personality disorder than users who had Type A personalities. Type B personalities were rated higher than Type A personalities on symptoms of all DSM-IV personality disorders, with the exception of schizoid personality disorder.

The research conducted in the experiment was tested on 370 outpatients and inpatients who used alcohol, cocaine, and opiates. The personality types and distinctions were replicated. Additionally within the personality dimensions Type A and Type B exhibited different results. Type A personality portrayed higher levels of agreeableness, conscientiousness, cooperativeness, and self-directedness. In contrast, Type B personality showed higher levels of neuroticism, novelty seeking, and harm avoidance. These dimensions can have high correlational levels with mental illness or substance use disorders. Furthermore, even after antisocial personality and psychiatric symptoms, these effects remained.

== See also ==
- Alpha (ethology)
- Extraversion and introversion
- Hans Eysenck § Model of personality
- Humorism
- Type D personality
- Theory X and Theory Y
