= Sensory preconditioning =

Sensory preconditioning is an extension of classical conditioning. Procedurally, sensory preconditioning involves repeated simultaneous presentations (pairing) of two neutral stimuli (NS, e.g. a light and a tone), i.e. stimuli that are not associated with a desired unconditioned response (UR, e.g. salivation).

Sensory preconditioning is usually followed by repeatedly pairing one of the NS (e.g., the light) with an unconditional stimulus (US, e.g., lemon juice on the tongue to produce salivation) until it elicits the response, which is now a conditioned response (CR, salivation, in this example). To accomplish this, delayed conditioning (see classical conditioning) is generally most effective.

At this point, the second NS (i.e., the tone noted above) will also elicit the response even though it has never been paired with the US. In short, sensory preconditioning in conjunction with classical conditioning resulted in the tone becoming a conditional stimulus (CS) for the conditioned response.

The term "sensory preconditioning" was coined by W. J. Brogden in 1939 at Johns Hopkins University. During the first stage of a sensory preconditioning procedure, two neutral stimuli (NS1 and NS2) are paired together either simultaneously or serially. During stage two, the traditional CS1→CR response is established. Subsequently, the CS2 (that has never been directly paired with the US) will begin to elicit the conditioned response. This suggests that the first stage S-S pairings have affected responding because the NS2 does not elicit salivation until after the (NS1) US→UR pairings have resulted in a CS1→CR relationship.

A forward conditioning experiment using a between-subjects design, followed by CS1 extinction suggests the possibility of an S-S pathway (Rizley and Rescorla, 1972). The experiment used a conditioned suppression paradigm following an A→ X | X→US| A→CR design.

Stage one: Tone (NS2) was presented serially with a Light (NS1)

Stage two: Light (NS1) was paired with a shock (US)

Test: NS2 elicited a conditioned response that was similar to that elicited by the light; thus, both the light that was paired with the shock and the tone that was never paired with the shock both became CS in relation to the organisms' "shock responses" (CRs).

Following this sensory preconditioning procedure, responding to the CS1 (i.e., the light) was extinguished via classical conditioning by repeatedly presenting the light in the absence of the shock. Normally, this CS1 extinction does not affect the CR to CS2. However, in this sensory preconditioning experiment the extinction of CS1 transferred to CS2, suggesting an associative chain explanation whereby CS2→CS1→UCS→Response.

For the tone to be paired with the response, it would need exposure to the shock during stage 1, but it doesn't. The response cannot occur until the second stage when the shock is presented. Therefore, an S-R account can be discarded as there is no response in stage one.
