= Nomenclature =

System of names or terms in a particular field of arts or sciences

Nomenclature (UK: /noʊˈmɛŋklətʃə, nə-/, US: /ˈnoʊmənkleɪtʃər/) is a system of names or terms, or the rules for forming these terms in a particular field of arts or sciences. The theoretical field studying nomenclature is sometimes referred to as onymology or taxonymy. The principles of naming vary from the relatively informal conventions of everyday speech to the internationally agreed principles, rules, and recommendations that govern the formation and use of the specialist terminology used in scientific and any other disciplines.

Naming "things" is a part of general human communication using words and language: it is an aspect of everyday taxonomy as people distinguish the objects of their experience, together with their similarities and differences, which observers identify, name and classify. The use of names, as the many different kinds of nouns embedded in different languages, connects nomenclature to theoretical linguistics, while the way humans mentally structure the world in relation to word meanings and experience relates to the philosophy of language.

Onomastics, the study of proper names and their origins, includes: anthroponymy (concerned with human names, including personal names, surnames and nicknames); toponymy (the study of place names); and etymology (the derivation, history and use of names) as revealed through comparative and descriptive linguistics.

The scientific need for simple, stable and internationally accepted systems for naming objects of the natural world has generated many formal nomenclatural systems. Probably the best known of these nomenclatural systems are the five codes of biological nomenclature that govern the Latinized scientific names of organisms.

== Etymology ==
The word nomenclature is derived from the Latin word nomen ('name'), and calare ('to call'). The Latin term nomenclatura refers to a list of names, as does the word nomenclator, which can also indicate a provider or announcer of names.

== Onomastics and nomenclature ==
The study of proper names is known as onomastics, which has a wide-ranging scope that encompasses all names, languages, and geographical regions, as well as cultural areas.

The distinction between onomastics and is not readily clear: onomastics is an unfamiliar discipline to most people, and the use of nomenclature in an academic sense is also not commonly known. Although the two fields integrate, nomenclature concerns itself more with the rules and conventions that are used for the formation of names.

== Influence of social, political, religious factors ==
Due to social, political, religious, and cultural motivations, things that are the same may be given different names, while different things may be given the same name; closely related similar things may be considered separate, while on the other hand significantly different things might be considered the same.

For example, Hindi and Urdu are both closely related, mutually intelligible Hindustani languages (one being sanskritised and the other arabised). However, they are favored as separate languages by Hindus and Muslims respectively, as seen in the context of Hindu-Muslim conflict resulting in the violence of the 1947 Partition of India. In contrast, mutually unintelligible dialects that differ considerably in structure, such as Moroccan Arabic, Yemeni Arabic, and Lebanese Arabic, are considered to be the same language due to the pan-Islamism religious identity.

== Cultural nomenclature ==
Names provide us with a way of structuring and mapping the world in our minds so, in some way, they mirror or represent the objects of our experience.

=== Names, words, language, meaning ===
Elucidating the connections between language (especially names and nouns), meaning, and the way we perceive the world has provided a rich field of study for philosophers and linguists. Relevant areas of study include: the distinction between proper names and proper nouns; as well as the relationship between names, their referents, meanings (semantics), and the structure of language.

=== Folk taxonomy ===
Modern scientific taxonomy has been described as "basically a Renaissance codification of folk taxonomic principles." Formal systems of scientific nomenclature and classification are exemplified by biological classification. All classification systems are established for a purpose. The scientific classification system anchors each organism within the nested hierarchy of internationally accepted classification categories. Maintenance of this system involves formal rules of nomenclature and periodic international meetings of review. This modern system evolved from the folk taxonomy of prehistory.

Folk taxonomy can be illustrated through the Western tradition of horticulture and gardening. Unlike scientific taxonomy, folk taxonomies serve many purposes. Examples in horticulture would be the grouping of plants, and naming of these groups, according to their properties and uses:

- annuals, biennials and perennials (nature of life cycle);
- vegetables, fruits, culinary herbs and spices (culinary use);
- herbs, trees and shrubs (growth habit);
- wild and cultivated plants (whether they are managed or not); and
- weeds (whether they are considered to be a nuisance or not), etc.

Folk Taxonomy is generally associated with the way rural or indigenous peoples use language to make sense of and organise the objects around them. Ethnobiology frames this interpretation through either "utilitarianists" like Bronislaw Malinowski who maintain that names and classifications reflect mainly material concerns, and "intellectualists" like Claude Lévi-Strauss who hold that they spring from innate mental processes. The literature of ethnobiological classifications was reviewed in 2006. Folk classification is defined by the way in which members of a language community name and categorize plants and animals whereas ethnotaxonomy refers to the hierarchical structure, organic content, and cultural function of biological classification that ethnobiologists find in every society around the world.

Ethnographic studies of the naming and classification of animals and plants in non-Western societies have revealed some general principles that suggest pre-scientific man's conceptual and linguistic method of organising the biological world in a hierarchical way. Such studies indicate that the urge to classify is a basic human instinct.

- in all languages natural groups of organisms are distinguished (present-day taxa)
- these groups are arranged into more inclusive groups or ethnobiological categories
- in all languages there are about five or six ethnobiological categories of graded inclusiveness
- these groups (ethnobiological categories) are arranged hierarchically, generally into mutually exclusive ranks
- the ranks at which particular organisms are named and classified is often similar in different cultures

The levels, moving from the most to least inclusive, are:

1. "unique beginner" — e.g. plant or animal. A single all-inclusive name rarely used in folk taxonomies but loosely equivalent to an original living thing, a "common ancestor"
2. "life form" — e.g. tree, bird, grass and fish. These are usually primary lexemes (basic linguistic units) loosely equivalent to a phylum or major biological division.
3. "generic name" — e.g. oak, pine, robin, catfish. This is the most numerous and basic building block of all folk taxonomies, the most frequently referred to, the most important psychologically, and among the first learned by children. These names can usually be associated directly with a second level group. Like life-form names these are primary lexemes.
4. "specific name" — e.g. white fir, post oak. More or less equivalent to species. A secondary lexeme and generally less frequent than generic names.
5. "varietal name" — e.g. baby lima bean, butter lima bean.

In almost all cultures objects are named using one or two words equivalent to 'kind' (genus) and 'particular kind' (species). When made up of two words (a binomial) the name usually consists of a noun (like salt, dog or star) and an adjectival second word that helps describe the first, and therefore makes the name, as a whole, more "specific", for example, lap dog, sea salt, or film star. The meaning of the noun used for a common name may have been lost or forgotten (whelk, elm, lion, shark, pig) but when the common name is extended to two or more words much more is conveyed about the organism's use, appearance or other special properties (sting ray, poison apple, giant stinking hogweed, hammerhead shark). These noun-adjective binomials are just like our own names with a family or surname like Simpson and another adjectival Christian or forename name that specifies which Simpson, say Homer Simpson. It seems reasonable to assume that the form of scientific names we call binomial nomenclature is derived from this simple and practical way of constructing common names—but with the use of Latin as a universal language.

In keeping with the utilitarian view other authors maintain that ethnotaxonomies resemble more a "complex web of resemblances" than a neat hierarchy. Likewise, a recent study has suggested that some folk taxonomies display more than six ethnobiological categories. Others go further and even doubt the reality of such categories, especially those above the generic name level.

== Names and nouns ==
A name is a label for any noun: names can identify a class or category of things; or a single thing, either uniquely or within a given context. Names are given, for example, to humans or any other organisms, places, products—as in brand names—and even to ideas or concepts. It is names as nouns that are the building blocks of nomenclature.

The word name is possibly derived from the Proto-Indo-European language hypothesised word nomn. The distinction between names and nouns, if made at all, is extremely subtle, although clearly noun refers to names as lexical categories and their function within the context of language, rather that as "labels" for objects and properties.

=== Personal names ===
Human personal names, also referred to as prosoponyms, are presented, used and categorised in many ways depending on the language and culture. In most cultures (Indonesia is one exception) it is customary for individuals to be given at least two names. In Western culture, the first name is given at birth or shortly thereafter and is referred to as the given name, the forename, the baptismal name (if given then), or simply the first name. In England prior to the Norman invasion of 1066, small communities of Celts, Anglo-Saxons and Scandinavians generally used single names: each person was identified by a single name as either a personal name or nickname. As the population increased, it gradually became necessary to identify people further—giving rise to names like John the butcher, Henry from Sutton, and Roger son of Richard...which naturally evolved into John Butcher, Henry Sutton, and Roger Richardson. We now know this additional name variously as the second name, last name, family name, surname or occasionally the byname, and this natural tendency was accelerated by the Norman tradition of using surnames that were fixed and hereditary within individual families. In combination these two names are now known as the personal name or, simply, the name. There are many exceptions to this general rule: Westerners often insert a third or more names between the given and surnames; Chinese and Hungarian names have the family name preceding the given name; females now often retain their maiden names (their family surname) or combine, using a hyphen, their maiden name and the surname of their husband; some East Slavic nations insert the patronym (a name derived from the given name of the father) between the given and the family name; in Iceland the given name is used with the patronym, or matronym (a name derived from the given name of the mother), and surnames are rarely used. Nicknames (sometimes called hypocoristic names) are informal names used mostly between friends.

=== Common names and proper names ===
The distinction between proper names and common names is that proper names denote a unique entity e.g. London Bridge, while common names are used in a more general sense in reference to a class of objects e.g. bridge. Many proper names are obscure in meaning as they lack any apparent meaning in the way that ordinary words mean, probably for the practical reason that when they consist of Collective nouns, they refer to groups, even when they are inflected for the singular e.g. "committee". Concrete nouns like "cabbage" refer to physical bodies that can be observed by at least one of the senses while abstract nouns, like "love" and "hate" refer to abstract objects. In English, many abstract nouns are formed by adding noun-forming suffixes ('-ness', '-ity', '-tion') to adjectives or verbs e.g. "happiness", "serenity", "concentration." Pronouns like "he", "it", "which", and "those" stand in place of nouns in noun phrases.

The capitalization of nouns varies with language and even the particular context: journals often have their own house styles for common names.

=== -onym nouns ===
Distinctions may be made between particular kinds of names simply by using the suffix -onym, from the Greek ónoma (ὄνομα, 'name'). So we have, for example, hydronyms name bodies of water, synonyms are names with the same meaning, and so on. The entire field could be described as chrematonymy—the names of things.

=== Toponyms ===
Toponyms are proper names given to various geographical features (geonyms), and also to cosmic features (cosmonyms). This could include names of mountains, rivers, seas, villages, towns, cities, countries, planets, stars etc. Toponymy can be further divided into specialist branches, like: choronymy, the study of proper names of regions and countries; econymy, the study of proper names of villages, towns and cities; hodonymy, the study of proper names of streets and roads; hydronymy, the study of proper names of water bodies; oronymy, the study of proper names of mountains and hills, etc.

Toponymy has popular appeal because of its socio-cultural and historical interest and significance for cartography. However, work on the etymology of toponyms has found that many place names are descriptive, honorific or commemorative but frequently they have no meaning, or the meaning is obscure or lost. Also, the many categories of names are frequently interrelated. For example, many place-names are derived from personal names (Victoria), many names of planets and stars are derived from the names of mythological characters (Venus, Neptune), and many personal names are derived from place-names, names of nations and the like (Wood, Bridge).

== Scientific nomenclature ==
=== Nomenclature, classification, identification ===
In a strictly scientific sense, nomenclature is regarded as a part of taxonomy (though distinct from it). Moreover, the precision demanded by science in the accurate naming of objects in the natural world has resulted in a variety of codes of nomenclature (worldwide-accepted sets of rules on biological classification).

Taxonomy can be defined as the study of classification including its principles, procedures and rules, while classification itself is the ordering of taxa (the objects of classification) into groups based on similarities or differences. Doing taxonomy entails identifying, describing, and naming taxa; therefore, in the scientific sense, nomenclature is the branch of taxonomy concerned with the application of scientific names to taxa, based on a particular classification scheme, in accordance with agreed international rules and conventions.

Identification determines whether a particular organism matches a taxon that has already been classified and named – so classification must precede identification. This procedure is sometimes referred to as determination.

=== Biology ===
Although Linnaeus' system of binomial nomenclature was rapidly adopted after the publication of his Species Plantarum and Systema Naturae in 1753 and 1758 respectively, it was a long time before there was international consensus concerning the more general rules governing biological nomenclature. The first botanical code was produced in 1905, the zoological code in 1889 and cultivated plant code in 1953. Agreement on the nomenclature and symbols for genes emerged in 1979.

- International Code of Nomenclature for algae, fungi, and plants
- International Code of Nomenclature of Prokaryotes
- International Code of Nomenclature for Cultivated Plants
- International Code of Zoological Nomenclature
- Virus nomenclature – used in Virus classification
- Enzyme nomenclature
- PhyloCode (the International Code of Phylogenetic Nomenclature) – a recent code of biological nomenclature that took effect in 2020 (see also Phylogenetic nomenclature).
- Terminologia Anatomica – international standard on human anatomic terminology
- Gene nomenclature
- Red Cell Nomenclature
- Global Medical Device Nomenclature (GMDN) – used in medical devices.

=== Astronomy ===
Over the last few hundred years, the number of identified astronomical objects has risen from hundreds to over a billion, and more are discovered every year. Astronomers need universal systematic designations to unambiguously identify all of these objects using astronomical naming conventions, while assigning names to the most interesting objects and, where relevant, naming important or interesting features of those objects.

- Planetary nomenclature
- Meteorite nomenclature
- International Astronomical Union

=== Chemistry ===
The IUPAC nomenclature is a system of naming chemical compounds and for describing the science of chemistry in general. It is maintained by the International Union of Pure and Applied Chemistry.

- the Blue Book and the Red Book: the two publications containing the rules for naming organic and inorganic compounds.
- the Green Book, contains recommendations for the use of symbols for physical quantities (in association with the IUPAP)
- the Gold Book, defines a large number of technical terms used in chemistry.

Similar compendia exist for biochemistry (in association with the IUBMB), analytical chemistry and macromolecular chemistry. These books are supplemented by shorter recommendations for specific circumstances which are published from time to time in the journal Pure and Applied Chemistry. These systems can be accessed through the International Union of Pure and Applied Chemistry (IUPAC).

=== Other sciences ===
- Metallurgy: the classic English translation of De re metallica includes an appendix (Appendix C) detailing problems of nomenclature in weights and measures.
- Physics: symbols, units and nomenclature.
- Archaeology: typology and archaeological record

== See also ==
- International Union of Biochemistry and Molecular Biology
- British Approved Name
- Controlled vocabulary
- Metadata
- Naming convention
- Terminology
- Nomenklatura

== Sources ==
- Keats-Rohan, Katharine, ed. (2007). Prosopography Approaches and Applications: A Handbook. Oxford: Unit for Prosopographical Research. ISBN 9781900934121.
- Room, Adrian (1996). An Alphabetical Guide to the Language of Name Studies. Lanham and London: The Scarecrow Press. ISBN 9780810831698.
