= Glottonym =

Name for an individual language or family of languages

A glottonym (from Attic Greek γλῶττα glôtta ‘language’, and the suffix -onym, from Aeolic and Doric Greek ὄνυμα ónuma ‘name’), also called a glossonym (using Ionic Greek γλῶσσα glôssa ‘language’) or less commonly a linguonym (using Latin lingua ‘language’), is a proper name designating an individual language or a language family. The study of language names is known as glottonymy (glossonymy, linguonymy) or glottonymics (glossonymics, linguonymics). (Note: Glottonym and glottonymy will be used in this article where possible to avoid burdensome repetition.)

As a distinctive linguistic discipline, glottonymic studies are closely related to some other onomastic disciplines, particularly those that are focused on the study of ethnonyms (names of ethnic groups) and choronyms (names of regions and countries). In that context, the field is related to ethnolinguistic and sociolinguistic studies. Various questions related to the study of formation and use of language names are also relevant for several other disciplines within social sciences and humanities. The field of glottonymic studies is still considered to be in its formative stages.

== Terminology and early history ==
The term linguonym was the first term coined, in 1973. However, in the following decade, it would meet with some objections from classicists, who criticized its formation as a “mixing of Latin and Greek”. In 1976, glottonym was introduced and would begin to displace linguonym. (Note: For example, David L. Gold used linguonym and linguonymy in a 1977 paper – apparently coining the terms independently and unaware that linguonym had already been introduced by Duliĉenko – before switching to glottonym and glottonymy in 1980.) Further attempts to define the field were made in 1979. By the late 1980s, three synonymous terms (glottonym, glossonym, linguonym) had come into use, primarily among linguists and other scholars. Glottonym is the most used term in English nowadays, followed by glossonym and linguonym.

== Typology ==
Language names can be classified by several criteria. According to origin, they can be divided into two groups:

- endonymic language names (known as endoglottonyms/autoglottonyms) (Note: Also endoglossonyms/autoglossonyms or endolinguonyms/autolinguonyms.) meaning language names of endonymic (native) origin, created and used by native speakers as designations for their languages; for example, the term Deutsch is an endolinguonym (native name) for the language that is called German in English;
- exonymic language names (known as exoglottonyms/alloglottonyms) (Note: Also exoglossonyms/alloglossonyms or exolinguonyms.) meaning language names of exonymic (foreign) origin, created and used by those who are not native speakers of the referred languages; for example, the term German is an exolinguonym (foreign name), used in English language as a designation for the language that is called Deutsch by its native speakers.

== Related terms ==
In recent years, some authors have proposed the term "logonym" as an alternative designation for the onomastic class that includes the names of languages, thus avoiding the use of already accepted terms (linguonym, glossonym, glottonym). Critics replied that the proposed term (logonym) has several meanings, spanning different fields of study. As of 2015 the term had not gained wide acceptance.

Searching for appropriate onomastic terms for some other classes of proper names, several researchers have tried to use term linguonym (glossonym, glottonym) as a designation not for the names of languages, but for a specific class of anthroponyms (proper names of humans, individual and collective) that are given to the groups of speakers of any particular language. Some of those attempts were made as a result of misunderstanding, by referencing to official UNESCO documents, that used those terms in their proper meaning, as designations for language names, thus revealing the lack of bases for the proposed alternative uses. Other attempts were made without any referencing, or addressing the issue of the proper meanings and uses of the terms.

In the same time, the question of defining an appropriate anthroponomastic term for the specific class of proper names that are given to groups of speakers of any particular language (names such as: Anglophones / speakers of English, or Francophones / speakers of French), remained opened and focused on several available solutions that would combine classical terms for speakers or speaking (based on Latin verb loquor, loqui, locutus) with standard suffix -onym, thus producing the term loquonym. Such issues, related to proper formation and use of onomastic terms, have gained importance in scholarly circles, since international surveys among experts revealed the existence of several challenging issues related to the process of terminological standardization within the field.

== See also ==
- List of language names

== Sources ==
- Back, Otto (1988). "Glottonyme und Ethnonyme". Die Slawischen Sprachen. 14: 5–9.
- Coupland, Nikolas; Jaworski, Adam, eds. (2009). Sociolinguistics: The Sociolinguistics of Multilingualism. Vol. 4. London: Routledge. ISBN 9780415408547.
- Dubois, Alain (2000). "Synonymies and related lists in zoology: General proposals, with examples in herpetology". Dumerilia. 14 (2): 33–98.
- Duliĉenko, Aleksandro D. (1973). "La lingvonimiko — ĝiaj esenco kaj problemoj". Scienca Revuo. 24 (2–3): 83–90.
- Дуличенко, Александр Д. (2020). "Лингвонимика" (PDF). Ученые записки Петрозаводского государственного университета. 42 (7): 13–16.
- Goebl, Hans (1979). "Glottonymie, Glottotomie und Schizoglossie: Drei sprachpolitisch bedeutsame Begriffe" (PDF). Ladinia. 3: 7–38. doi:10.54218/ladinia.03.7-38. S2CID 239136530.
- Gold, David L. (1977). "Dzhudezmo". Language Sciences. 4: 14–16.
- Gold, David L. (1980). "The Spanish, Portuguese and Hebrew Names for Yiddish and the Yiddish Names for Hebrew". International Journal of the Sociology of Language (24): 29–42. ISBN 9789027930286.
- Gold, David L. (1983). "Planning Glottonyms for Jewish Languages (With Emphasis on Judezmo and Yahudic)". Jewish Language Review. 3: 71–95.
- Good, Jeff; Cysouw, Michael (2013). "Languoid, Doculect, and Glossonym: Formalizing the Notion Language" (PDF). Language Documentation & Conservation. 7: 331–359.
- Harvalík, Milan; Caffarelli, Enzo, eds. (2007). "Onomastic Terminology: An International Survey" (PDF). Rivista Italiana di Onomastica. 13 (1): 181–220.
- Kahane, Henry; Kahane, Renée (1976). "Lingua Franca: The Story of a Term". Romance Philology. JSTOR 44941693.
- Kamusella, Tomasz (2015). Creating Languages in Central Europe During the Last Millennium. Basingstoke: Palgrave Macmillan. ISBN 9781137507846.
- Kikvidze, Zaal (2013). "Lost and Acquired in Translation: Shades of Meaning in Language Names". General and Specialist Translation/Interpretation: Theory, Methods, Practice. Vol. 6. Kyiv. pp. 194–198.
- Klamer, Marian (2010). A Grammar of Teiwa. Berlin-New York: Walter de Gruyter. ISBN 9783110226072.
- Léglise, Isabelle; Migge, Bettina (2006). "Language-Naming Practices, Ideologies, and Linguistic Practices: Toward a Comprehensive Description of Language Varieties". Language in Society. 35 (3): 313–339. doi:10.1017/S0047404506060155. hdl:10197/5810. JSTOR 4169502. S2CID 145616987.
- Martí, Fèlix (2005). Words and Worlds: World Languages Review. Clevedon: Multilingual Matters. ISBN 9781853598272.
- Peetermans, Andy (2016). "Glottonymy as a could-be subfield of onomastics: Terminological considerations and historiographical applications". Annual Colloquium of the Henry Sweet Society. Cambridge: Pembroke College.
- Picone, Michael D. (2015). "French Dialects of Louisiana: A Revised Typology". New Perspectives on Language Variety in the South: Historical and Contemporary Approaches. Tuscaloosa: University of Alabama Press. pp. 267–287. ISBN 9780817318154.
- Reisigl, Martin; Wodak, Ruth (2001). Discourse and Discrimination: Rhetorics of Racism and Antisemitism. London-New York: Routledge. ISBN 9781134579570.
- Room, Adrian (1996). An Alphabetical Guide to the Language of Name Studies. Lanham and London: The Scarecrow Press. ISBN 9780810831698.
- Skutnabb-Kangas, Tove (2000). Linguistic Genocide in Education - or Worldwide Diversity and Human Rights?. Mahwah: Erlbaum Associates. ISBN 1135662363.
- Wicklander, Dale R. (1978). Ethical Survey of Culture Media: Narration and Worksheets. Winston-Salem: Hunter. ISBN 9780894590412.
- Wodak, Ruth (2001). "Politikwissenschaft und Diskursanalyse: Diskurs in/der Politik". Demokratie: Mudus und Telos: Beïtrage für Anton Pelinka. Wien: Böhlau Verlag. pp. 75–99. ISBN 9783205993421.
