= Heteronym =

Heteronym may refer to:

- Heteronym (linguistics), one of a group of words with identical spellings but different meanings and pronunciations
- Heteronym (literature), imaginary characters created by a poet

== See also ==
- -onym
- Homonym
- Capitonym
- Homograph
- Polysemy
- Mondegreen
