= Autonym =

Autonym may refer to:

- Autonym (semantics), the name used by a person to refer to themselves or their language
- Autonym (botany), an automatically created infrageneric or infraspecific name

== See also ==
- Nominotypical subspecies, in zoology, a similar concept to autonym in botany
- Xenonym
- -onym
