= Folk taxonomy =

Vernacular, as opposed to scientific, naming system

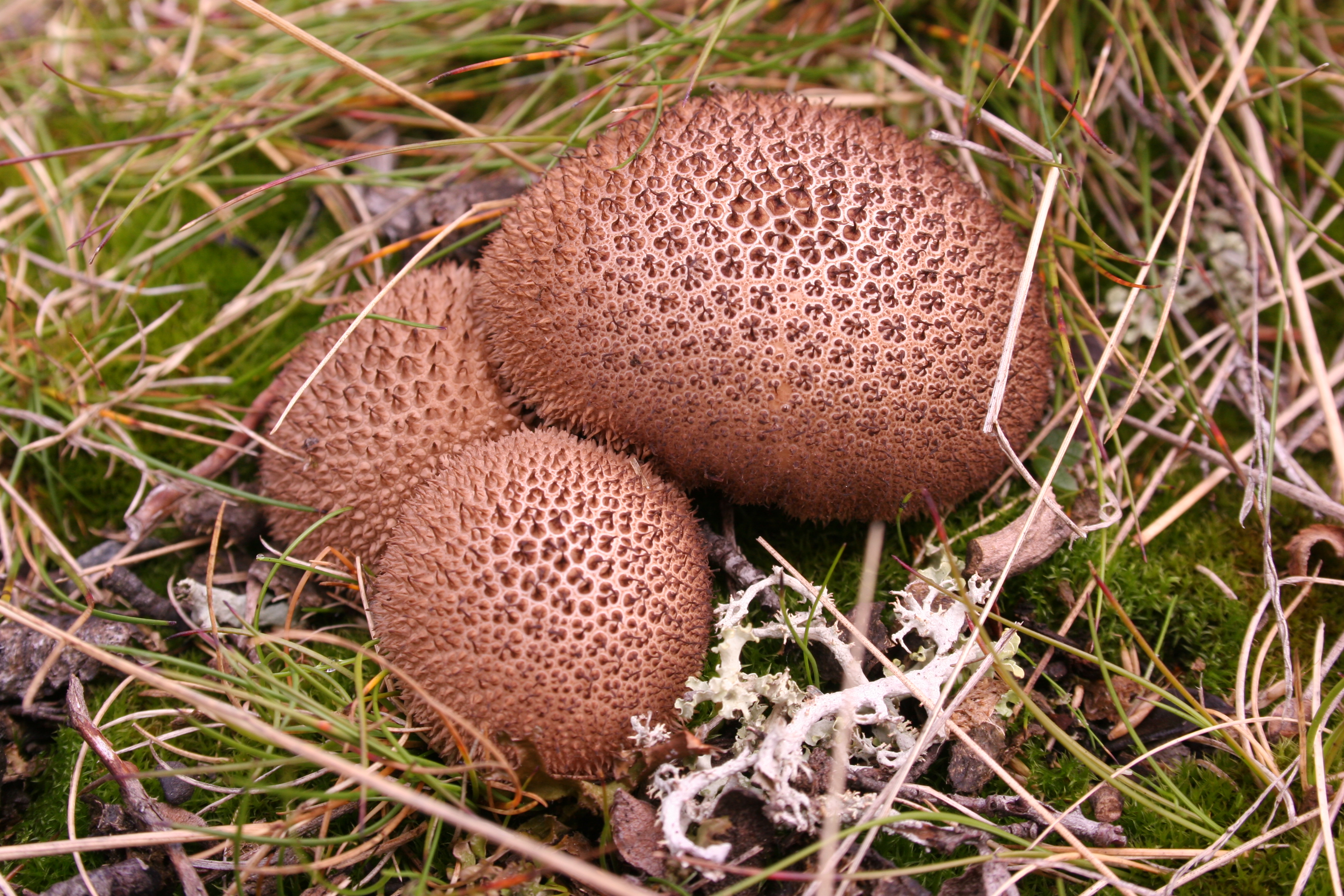
Lycoperdon umbrinum is known as the umber-brown puffball. The folk taxonomic term puffball has no direct scientific equivalent, and does not slot precisely into scientific taxonomy.

A folk taxonomy is a vernacular naming system, as distinct from scientific taxonomy. Folk biological classification is the way people traditionally describe and organize the world around them, typically making generous use of form taxa such as "shrubs", "bugs", "ducks", "fish", "algae", "vegetables", or of economic criteria such as "game animals", "pack animals", "weeds" and other like terms.

Folk taxonomies are generated from social knowledge and are used in everyday speech. They are distinguished from scientific taxonomies that claim to be disembedded from social relations and thus more objective and universal. Folk taxonomies exist to allow popular identification of classes of objects, and apply to all subsections of human activity. All parts of the world have their own systems of naming local plants and animals. These naming systems are a vital aid to survival and include information such as the fruiting patterns of trees and the habits of large mammals. These localised naming systems are folk taxonomies. The ancient naturalist Theophrastus recorded evidence of a Greek folk taxonomy for plants, but later formalized botanical taxonomies were laid out in the 18th century by Carl Linnaeus.

Anthropologists have observed that taxonomies are generally embedded in local cultural and social systems, and serve various social functions. One of the best-known and most influential studies of folk taxonomies is Émile Durkheim's The Elementary Forms of Religious Life. Scientists generally recognize that folk taxonomies conflict at times with Linnaean taxonomy or current interpretations of evolutionary relationships, and can tend to refer to generalized rather than quantitatively informative traits in an organism. Some anthropologists say race is a folk taxonomy.

== Linnaeus, Theophrastus, and folk taxonomy ==
Linnaean Taxonomy, which is also more properly called rank-based nomenclature, is a scientifically ranked based nomenclatural system for the classification of living organisms. Developed by Carl Linnaeus, this nomenclatural system allocates taxa (groups of biological organisms recognised by systematists) into categories (absolute ranks). Rank-based nomenclature developed long after Folk Taxonomy and the more scientific classifications developed by Aristotle and Theophrastus. This method of hierarchically ranking taxa was developed before the theory of evolution, and it can be applied to everyday phenomena.

Some cultures use folk taxonomies more or less specific, or in direct correlation with modern Linnaean Taxonomy in reference to biological taxa. In areas that the direct biological distinction of plants are more important, such as crops used for food or firewood, some cultures will have a one to one ratio of plants to their Linnaeus counterpart. The use of each group of taxa (species: words) from 2:1 to 1:1 to 1: many, define the cultural significance of each species and the level of specificity they use is their form of a culturally influenced folk taxonomy. Native Tzeltal speakers in the Mayan region of Mexico were found to have developed such divisions towards the crops they most frequently use in everyday life. The cultural significance determined the number of words that the Tzeltal group had for each crop, such as the leguminose legume (Phaseolus vulgaris L. at its most specific Linnaean taxa) was differentiated in Tzeltal into five specific words. This legume is a large farm crop that is extremely present in day-to-day life in this region.

Folk taxonomy precedes the Linnaean taxonomy chronologically. For instance, glottochronological evidence suggests that the names of five plants of great societal importance in Mesoamerica are more than 7000 years old. The 9/10 remaining volumes of Historia Plantarum, written by Theophrastus, early philosopher, botanist, and student of Aristotle, describe an initial vernacular naming system of plants. This taxonomy has been developed, but its principal of division was widely accepted until biological theories of evolution evolved. The books list around 500 species of plant native and present in ancient Greece. Theophrastus used sources such as Diocles for herbal information and a naming system similar to Aristotle's classification of animals. The books divide all plants into specific taxa that were used as early folk taxonomies to describe everyday plants in Greece and explain the anatomy of the following groups of taxa: Trees, Wild Trees, Shrubs, Pot-Herbs, Cereals, Legumes, and Herbals (medicinally used plants) as well as the unknown subject of a 10th Volume.

These taxa were used in everyday life as a man-made vernacular naming system for local taxa. Though biologically revolutionary at the time, these taxa were also linguistically revolutionary by defining plants in groups larger than themselves. Theophrastus was influenced by preceding local folk taxonomy in his naming system, but also added biological features to the names of many plants such as phylla(leaves), karpoi (fruits), and poai (seasonal herbs). Terms like phylla are still used in Linnaean and modern naming systems for trees today.

== Level of specificity ==
According to some authors, folk taxonomy includes several absolute levels that have been compared (very broadly) with Linnaean categories. Typically, five such ranks are recognized. The first one, the unique beginner, is extremely broad and has categories like plant or animal. Next is the life form level; life form taxa typically have names composed of a single word. The generic level is known to be the most important level of biological folk taxonomy. It's the most widely used and the first level to be learned by children. Classifications like maple tree, blue jay or tulip are made at this level. It's a very important stepping stone for all folk taxonomies. Specific and varietal are the final two levels. The categories get far more distinct and at least two words are necessary to describe them. However, the existence of these folk taxonomic ranks (or levels) has been questioned by a number of authors from different fields for more than 20 years. The facts that folk taxonomies are not as neatly hierarchical as previously thought, with taxa of intermediate levels often missing, that no folk taxonomic ranks have been recognized in Aristotle's zoological classification, and that antique Roman folk taxonomy requires at least eight levels (rather than the iconic five), also raise doubts about the objective reality of folk taxonomic ranks.

The number of depth levels and systems for classification can vary for nonbiological folk taxonomy. The first time a folk taxonomy hierarchy was published which did not feature plants or animals was in 1961 by Charles Frake in disease diagnosis of Mindanao in the Philippines. Frake's classification had four levels. The number of levels is often anywhere between three and five.

An example of how these levels of specificity work in day-to-day life can easily be seen when talking about a car. On the broadest level, it is a vehicle. On the next, it's a car. Even more distinctly, it's called a Toyota or a Toyota Highlander. All these words were used describe about the same thing, the wording just became more and more specific through the various folk taxonomy levels.

== Human taxonomy ==
In the 18th century, a botanist by the name of Carl Linnaeus proposed what we now know as human taxonomy, the idea that like within botany, human beings could too be classified taxonomically. Linnaeus distinguished groups of human beings upon the basis of their apparent race in addition to several outliers such as wild children (Homo sapiens ferus). However, as anthropology has developed Linnaeus' classifications have proven incompatible with the reality of human differentiation stemming from a cultural basis. Humans tend to be distinguishable, and distinguish themselves, according to their cultural norms, principally language, dress, aesthetics, and social attitudes.

== See also ==
- Baraminology (Creation science) – Supposed original forms of life created by God
- Cladistics – Method of biological systematics in evolutionary biology
- Common name – Name generally used for a taxon, group of taxa, or organism(s)
- Contrast set – Collection of related items in a schema or ontology
- Corporate taxonomy – Organization of a company's functions or data into categories
- Ethnotaxonomy
- Evolutionary taxonomy – Form of biological classification
- Family resemblance – Philosophical idea popularized by Ludwig Wittgenstein
- Folksonomy – Classification based on users' tags
- Incertae sedis – Term to indicate an uncertain taxonomic position
- Linnaean taxonomy – Rank based classification system for organisms
- Natural kind – Concept in the philosophy of science
- Parataxonomy
- Phylogenetics – Study of evolutionary relationships between organisms
- Prototype theory – Theory of categorization in psychology
- Wastebasket taxon – Classification of organisms that do not fit in other classifications

== Bibliography ==
- Bailenson, J.N., M.S. Shum, S. Atran, D.L. Medin, & J.D. Coley (2002) "A bird's eye view: biological categorization and reasoning within and across cultures". Cognition 84:1–53
- Berlin, Brent (1972) "Speculations on the growth of ethnobotanical nomenclature", Language in Society, 1, 51–86.
- Berlin, Brent & Dennis E. Breedlove & Peter H. Raven (1966) "Folk taxonomies and biological classification", Science, 154, 273–275.
- Berlin, Brent & Dennis E. Breedlove & Peter H. Raven (1973) "General principles of classification and nomenclature in folk biology", American Anthropologist, 75, 214–242.
- Brown, Cecil H. (1974) "Unique beginners and covert categories in folk biological taxonomies", American Anthropologist, 76, 325–327.
- Brown, Cecil H. & John Kolar & Barbara J. Torrey & Tipawan Truoong-Quang & Phillip Volkman. (1976) "Some general principles of biological and non-biological folk classification", American Ethnologist, 3, 1, 73–85.
- Brown, Cecil H. (1986) "The growth of ethnobiological nomenclature", Current Anthropology, 27, 1, 1–19.
