= Name =

One or more words used to refer to something

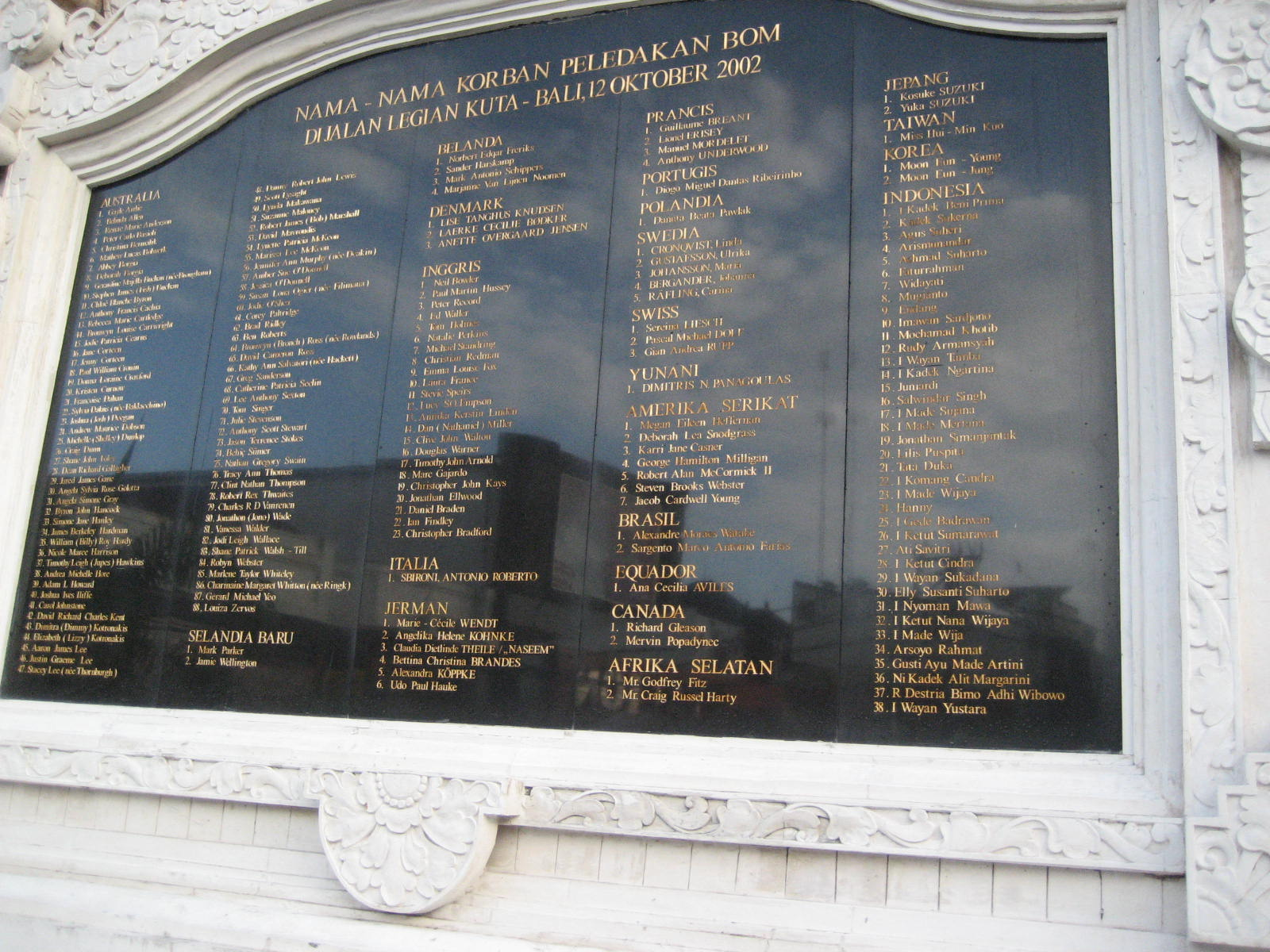
Names of the 2002 Bali bombings victims in Indonesia

A name is a term used for identification by an external observer. A name can identify a class or category of things, or a single thing, either uniquely, or within a given context. The entity identified by a name is called its referent. A personal name identifies, not necessarily uniquely, a specific individual human. The name of a specific entity is sometimes called a proper name (although that term has a philosophical meaning as well) and is, when consisting of only one word, a proper noun. Other nouns are sometimes called "common names" or (obsolete) "general names". A name can be given to a person, place, or thing; for example, parents can give their child a name or a scientist can give an element a name.

== Etymology ==
The word name comes from Old English nama; cognate with Old High German (OHG) namo, Sanskrit नामन् (nāman), Latin nomen, Greek ὄνομα (onoma), and Persian نام (nâm), from the Proto-Indo-European (PIE) *h₁nómn̥. Outside Indo-European, it can be connected to Proto-Uralic *nime.

== Naming conventions ==
A naming convention is a set of agreed, stipulated, or generally accepted standards, norms, social norms, or criteria for naming things.

Parents may follow a naming convention when selecting names for their children. Some have chosen alphabetical names by birth order. In some East Asian cultures it is common for one syllable in a two-syllable given name to be a generation name which is the same for immediate siblings. In many cultures it is common for the son to be named after the father or a grandfather. In certain African cultures, such as in Cameroon, the eldest son gets the family name for his given name. In other cultures, the name may include the place of residence, or the place of birth.

Major naming conventions include:

- In astronomy, astronomical naming conventions
- In biology, binomial nomenclature
- In chemistry, chemical nomenclature
- In classics, Roman naming conventions
- In computer programming, identifier naming conventions
- In computer networking, computer naming schemes
- In planetary science, planetary nomenclature
- In sciences generally, systematic names for a variety of things

Products may follow a naming convention. Automobiles typically have a binomial name, a "make" (manufacturer) and a "model", in addition to a model year, such as a 2007 Chevrolet Corvette. Sometimes there is a name for the car's "decoration level" or "trim line" as well: e.g., Cadillac Escalade EXT Platinum, after the precious metal. Computers often have increasing numbers in their names to signify the next generation.

Courses at schools typically follow a naming convention: an abbreviation for the subject area and then a number ordered by increasing level of difficulty.

Many numbers (e.g., bank accounts, government IDs, credit cards, etc.) are not random but have an internal structure and convention. Virtually all organizations that assign names or numbers will follow some convention in generating these identifiers. Airline flight numbers, Space Shuttle flight numbers, even phone numbers all have an internal convention.

== Personal name ==
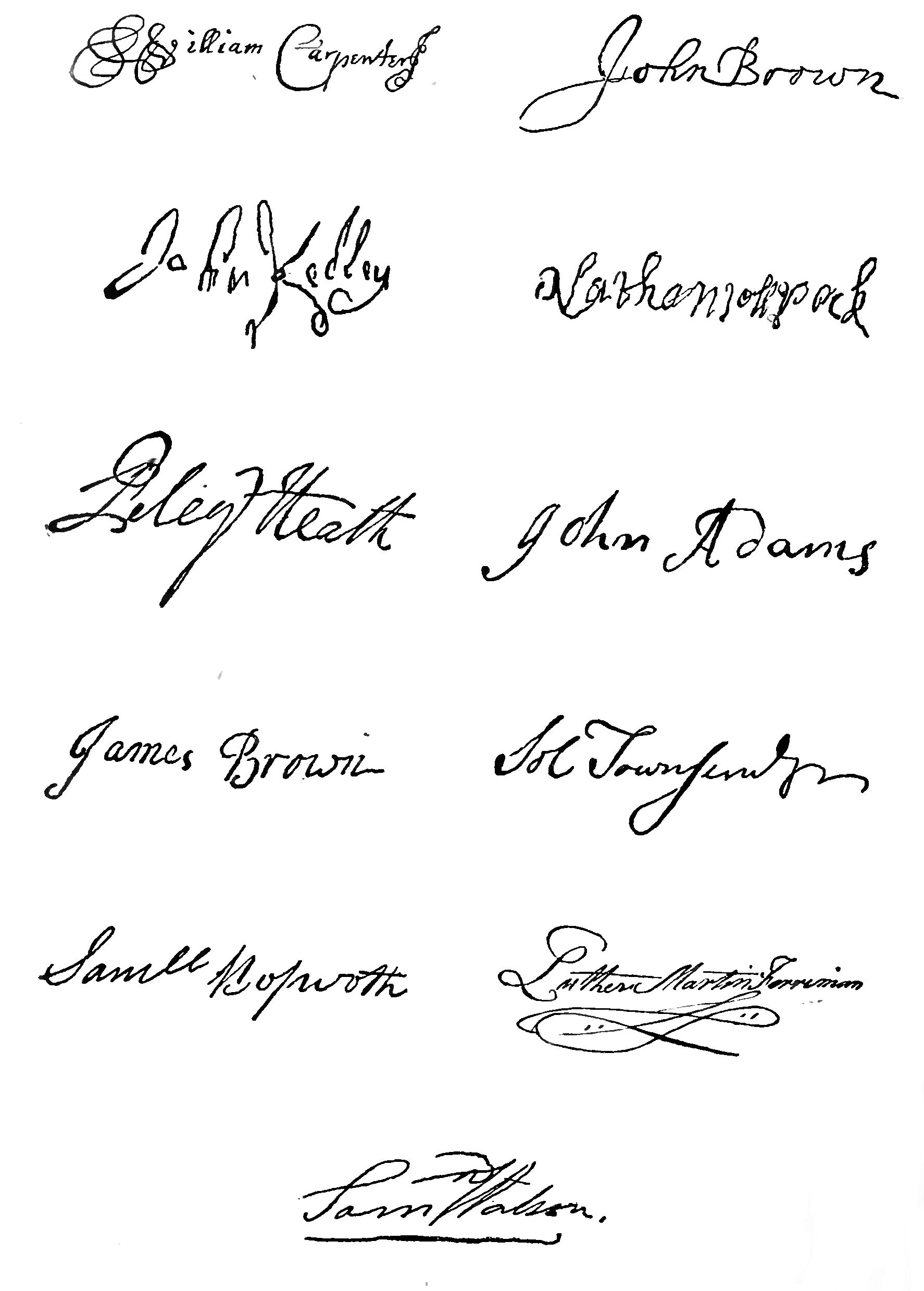
A signature is a person's own handwritten name

A personal name is an identifying word or words by which an individual is intimately known or designated. In many countries, it is traditional for individuals to have a personal name (also called a given name or first name) and a surname (also called a last name or family name because it is shared by members of the same family). Some people have two surnames, one inherited from each parent. In most of Europe and the Americas, the given name typically comes before the surname, whereas in parts of Asia and Hungary the surname comes before the given name (Eastern name order). In some cultures it is traditional for a woman to take her husband's surname when she gets married.

A common practice in many countries is patronym which means that a component of a personal name is based on the given name of one's father. A less common practice in countries is matronym which means that a component of a personal name is based on the given name of one's mother. In some East Asian cultures, it is traditional for given names to include a generation name, a syllable shared between siblings and cousins of the same generation.

Middle names are also used by many people as a third identifier, and can be chosen for personal reasons including signifying relationships, preserving pre-marital/maiden names (a popular practice in the United States), and to perpetuate family names. The practice of using middle names dates back to ancient Rome, where it was common for members of the elite to have a praenomen (a personal name), a nomen (a family name, not exactly used the way middle names are used today), and a cognomen (a name representing an individual attribute or the specific branch of a person's family). Middle names eventually fell out of use, but regained popularity in Europe during the nineteenth century.

Besides first, middle, and last names, individuals may also have nicknames, aliases, or titles. Nicknames are informal names used by friends or family to refer to a person ("Chris" may be used as a short form of the personal name "Christopher"). A person may choose to use an alias, or a fake name, instead of their real name, possibly to protect or obscure their identity. People may also have titles designating their role in an institution or profession (members of royal families may use various terms such as king, queen, duke, or duchess to signify their positions of authority or their relation to the throne).

== Names of names ==
In onomastic terminology, personal names of men are called andronyms (from Ancient Greek ἀνήρ / man, and ὄνομα / name), while personal names of women are called gynonyms (from Ancient Greek γυνή / woman, and ὄνομα / name).

Names of humans (anthroponyms)
Name of ...	Name of name
Full name of a person	Personal name
First name of a person	Given name
Birth name of a person	Birth name
Birth name of a transgender person	Deadname
Family name	Surname
Residents of a locality	Demonym
Ethnic group	Ethnonym
False or assumed name	Pseudonym
Pseudonym of an author	Pen name
Pseudonym of a performer	Stage name
Other names	-onym-suffixed words

Names of non-human entities
Name of a...	Name of name
Any geographical object	Toponym
Body of water	Hydronym
Mountain or hill	Oronym
Region or country	Choronym
Any inhabited locality	Econym
Village	Comonym
Town or city	Astionym
Cosmic object	Cosmonym
Star	Astronym
Other names	-onym-suffixed words

== Brand names ==
Developing a name for a brand or product is heavily influenced by marketing research and strategy to be appealing and marketable. The brand name is often a neologism or pseudoword, such as Kodak or Sony.

== Religious names ==
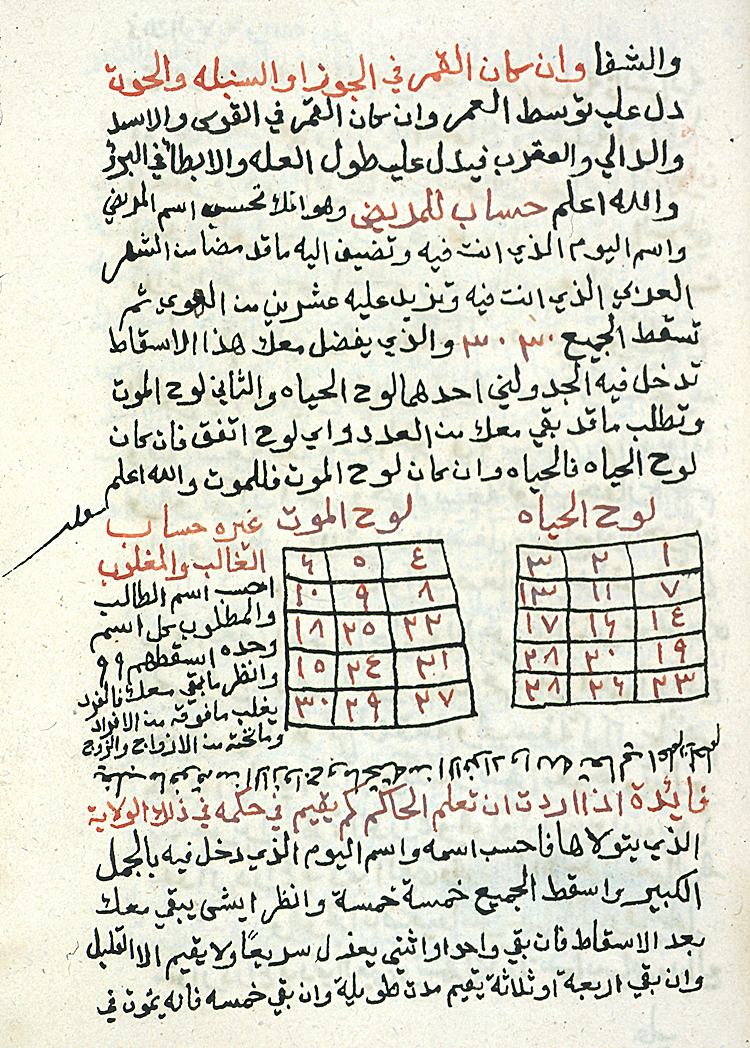
Two charts from an Arabic copy of the Secretum Secretorum for determining whether a person will live or die based on the numerical value of the patient's name.

In the ancient world, particularly in the ancient near-east (Israel, Mesopotamia, Egypt, Persia) names were thought to be extremely powerful and act, in some ways, as a separate manifestation of a person or deity. This viewpoint is responsible both for the reluctance to use the proper name of God in Hebrew writing or speech, as well as the common understanding in ancient magic that magical rituals had to be carried out "in [someone's] name". By invoking a god or spirit by name, one was thought to be able to summon that spirit's power for some kind of miracle or magic.

=== Biblical names ===
In the Old Testament, the names of individuals are meaningful, and a change of name indicates a change of status. For example, the patriarch Abram and his wife Sarai were renamed "Abraham" and "Sarah" at the institution of the Abrahamic covenant (Genesis 17:4, 17:15). Simon was renamed Peter when he was given the Keys to Heaven.

Throughout the Bible, characters are given names at birth that reflect something of significance or describe the course of their lives. For example: Solomon meant peace, and the king with that name was the first whose reign was without war. Likewise, Joseph named his firstborn son Manasseh (Hebrew: "causing to forget")(Genesis 41:51); when Joseph also said, "God has made me forget all my troubles and everyone in my father's family." Biblical Jewish people did not have surnames which were passed from generation to generation. However, they were typically known as the child of their father. For example: דוד בן ישי (David ben Yishay) meaning, David, son of Jesse (1 Samuel 17:12,58). Today, this style of name is still used in Jewish religious rites.

=== Indian name ===
Indian names are based on a variety of systems and naming conventions, which vary from region to region. Names are also influenced by religion and caste and may come from epics. India's population speaks a wide variety of languages and nearly every major religion in the world has a following in India. This variety makes for differences in names and naming styles. Due to historical Indian cultural influences, several names across South and Southeast Asia are influenced by or adapted from Indian names or words.

For some Indians, their birth name is different from their official name; the birth name starts with a randomly selected name from the person's horoscope (based on the nakshatra or lunar mansion corresponding to the person's birth).

Many children are given three names, sometimes as a part of religious teaching.

=== Quranic names ===
Most names in the Quran are Arabic, such as Allah, Muhammad, Khwaja, Ismail, Mehboob, Suhelahmed, Shoheb Ameena, Aaisha, Sameena, Rumana, and Swaleha.

== Name use by animals and plants ==
The use of personal names is not unique to humans. Dolphins and green-rumped parrotlets also use symbolic names to address contact calls to specific individuals. Individual dolphins have distinctive signature whistles, to which they will respond even when there is no other information to clarify which dolphin is being referred to.

== Named entities ==
In information extraction, a named entity is a real-world object, such as a person, location, organization, product, etc., that can be denoted with a proper name. It can be abstract or have a physical existence. Examples of named entities include Barack Obama, New York City, Volkswagen Golf, or anything else that can be named. Named entities can simply be viewed as entity instances (e.g., New York City is an instance of a city).

From a historical perspective, the term Named Entity was coined during the MUC-6 evaluation campaign and contained ENAMEX (entity name expressions e.g. persons, locations and organizations) and NUMEX (numerical expression).

A more formal definition can be derived from the rigid designator by Saul Kripke. In the expression "Named Entity", the word "Named" aims to restrict the possible set of entities to only those for which one or many rigid designators stands for the referent. A designator is rigid when it designates the same thing in every possible world. On the contrary, flaccid designators may designate different things in different possible worlds.

As an example, consider the sentence, "Biden is the president of the United States". Both "Biden" and the "United States" are named entities since they refer to specific objects (Joe Biden and United States). However, "president" is not a named entity since it can be used to refer to many different objects in different worlds (in different presidential periods referring to different persons, or even in different countries or organizations referring to different people). Rigid designators usually include proper names as well as certain natural terms like biological species and substances.

There is also a general agreement in the Named Entity Recognition community to consider temporal and numerical expressions as named entities, such as amounts of money and other types of units, which may violate the rigid designator perspective.

The task of recognizing named entities in text is Named Entity Recognition while the task of determining the identity of the named entities mentioned in text is called Named Entity Disambiguation. Both tasks require dedicated algorithms and resources to be addressed.

== See also ==
- Endonym and exonym - native and non-native names
- Human names
- Identifier
- List of adjectival forms of place names
- Name calling – a form of verbal abuse
- Name change
- Names of God
- Numeral (linguistics)
- Onomastics – the study of proper names
- Popular cat names
- Title (publishing)

== Sources ==
- Barolini, Teodolinda, ed. (2005). Medieval Constructions in Gender And Identity: Essays in Honor of Joan M. Ferrante. Tempe: Arizona Center for Medieval and Renaissance Studies. ISBN 9780866983372.
- Bruck, Gabriele vom; Bodenhorn, Barbara, eds. (2009) [2006]. An Anthropology of Names and Naming (2nd ed.). Cambridge: Cambridge University Press.
- Fraser, Peter M. (2000). "Ethnics as Personal Names". Greek Personal Names: Their Value as Evidence (PDF). Oxford: Oxford University Press. pp. 149–157. Archived from the original (PDF) on 18 October 2019.
- Roberts, Michael (2017). "The Semantics of Demonyms in English". The Semantics of Nouns. Oxford: Oxford University Press. pp. 205–220. ISBN 978-0-19-873672-1.
- Room, Adrian (1996). An Alphabetical Guide to the Language of Name Studies. Lanham and London: The Scarecrow Press. ISBN 9780810831698.
