= Religionym and confessionym =

Pair of polysemous onomastic terms

Religionym (from Latin: religio / religion, and Greek: ὄνομα / name) and confessionym (from Latin: confessio / confession, and Greek: ὄνομα / name) are neologisms that have several distinct meanings, generally related (from the semantic point of view) to religious (confessional) terminology, but are (in their specific meanings) defined and used differently among scholars. As a consequence of a wide variety of uses, specific meanings of those terms can be mutually distinct, but also overlapping. Some scholars have used one or the other term as designations for a particular onomastic class that encompasses the proper names of religions and cults (like: Hinduism, Buddhism, Christianity, Islam), while others have used the same terms (one or the other) as names for a particular anthroponymic class, encompassing the proper names that designate religious adherents (like: Hindus, Buddhists, Christians, Muslims). In scholarly literature, both terms (religionym and confessionym) are sometimes also used in much broader meaning, as designations for all terms that are semantically related to religious (confessional) terminology.

In the English-speaking world, lexical corpus that encompasses various words, terms and expressions that are related to the religious sphere of life is most commonly referred to as religious lexis, or religious lexicon. Those linguistic terms cover all of those widest meanings that were occasionally assigned (by some authors) to the terms religionym and confessionym, thus relieving them of such general uses, and consequently allowing the standardization of more specific uses for both of those terms.

In recent years, several scholarly attempts were made in order to differentiate between the existing uses, and thus define the preferred meanings of those terms, but no general agreement has been reached among scholars, and the use of both terms continues to depend on the context given to them by individual authors, in accordance with their preferred terminological traditions.

The problem of linguistic standardization of various neologisms (like religionym and confessionym) is generally related to the wider question of proper formation and use of onomastic terms. Such issues have gained importance in scholarly circles, since international surveys among experts revealed the existence of similar challenging issues, related to the process of terminological standardization within the field.

== See also ==
- Onomastics
- Lexical semantics
- Endonym and exonym
- Ethnonym

== Sources ==
- Adamczak-Krysztofowicz, Sylwia; Szczepaniak-Kozak, Anna (2017). "A disturbing view of intercultural communication: Findings of a study into hate speech in Polish" (PDF). Linguistica Silesiana. 38: 285–310.
- Balkanski, Teodor (2012). "À propos de la grouponymie" (PDF). Studii şi Cercetări de Onomasticăşi Lexicologie. 5 (1–2): 9–16.
- Brechelmacher, Angelika (2002). "Identity by way of demarcation - the discourse on the expansion of the European Union in Austria's leading daily papers". Us and Others: Social Identities Across Languages, Discourses and Cultures. Amsterdam-Philadelphia: John Benjamins Publishing Company. pp. 293–320. ISBN 1588112055.
- Bromley, Yulian V. (1984). Theoretical Ethnography. Moscow: Nauka.
- Chase, Thomas (1988). The English Religious Lexis. Lewiston: EMP. ISBN 9780889468269.
- Harvalík, Milan; Caffarelli, Enzo, eds. (2007). "Onomastic Terminology: An International Survey" (PDF). Rivista Italiana di Onomastica. 13 (1): 181–220.
- Pawlas, Szymon (2019). "Konfesjonimia, czyli o terminologii dotyczącej wyznań" (PDF). Acta Philologica. 55: 35–47.
- Reisigl, Martin; Wodak, Ruth (2001). Discourse and Discrimination: Rhetorics of Racism and Antisemitism. London-New York: Routledge. ISBN 9781134579570.
- Room, Adrian (1996). An Alphabetical Guide to the Language of Name Studies. Lanham and London: The Scarecrow Press. ISBN 9780810831698.
- Seiwert, Wolf-Dieter (1982). "Ethnonyme in der Westsahara: Struktur und Aussage". Ethnographisch-Archäologische Zeitschrift. 23: 121–137.
- Wodak, Ruth (2001). "Politikwissenschaft und Diskursanalyse: Diskurs in/der Politik". Demokratie: Mudus und Telos: Beïtrage für Anton Pelinka. Wien: Böhlau Verlag. pp. 75–99. ISBN 9783205993421.
- Wolf, Markus (2005). Žid - Kritik einer Wortverbannung: Imagologie Israels zwischen staatspolitischem Kalkül und künstlerischer Verfremdung. München: Sagner. ISBN 9783876909059.
- Zaynullin, Gabdulzyamil G.; Khabibullina, Alfiya M. (2017). "Stylistic Features of Comment in Arabic Blogosphere". Journal of History Culture and Art Research. 6 (5): 285–291. doi:10.7596/taksad.v6i5.1290.
