= Īhām =

Poetic literary device

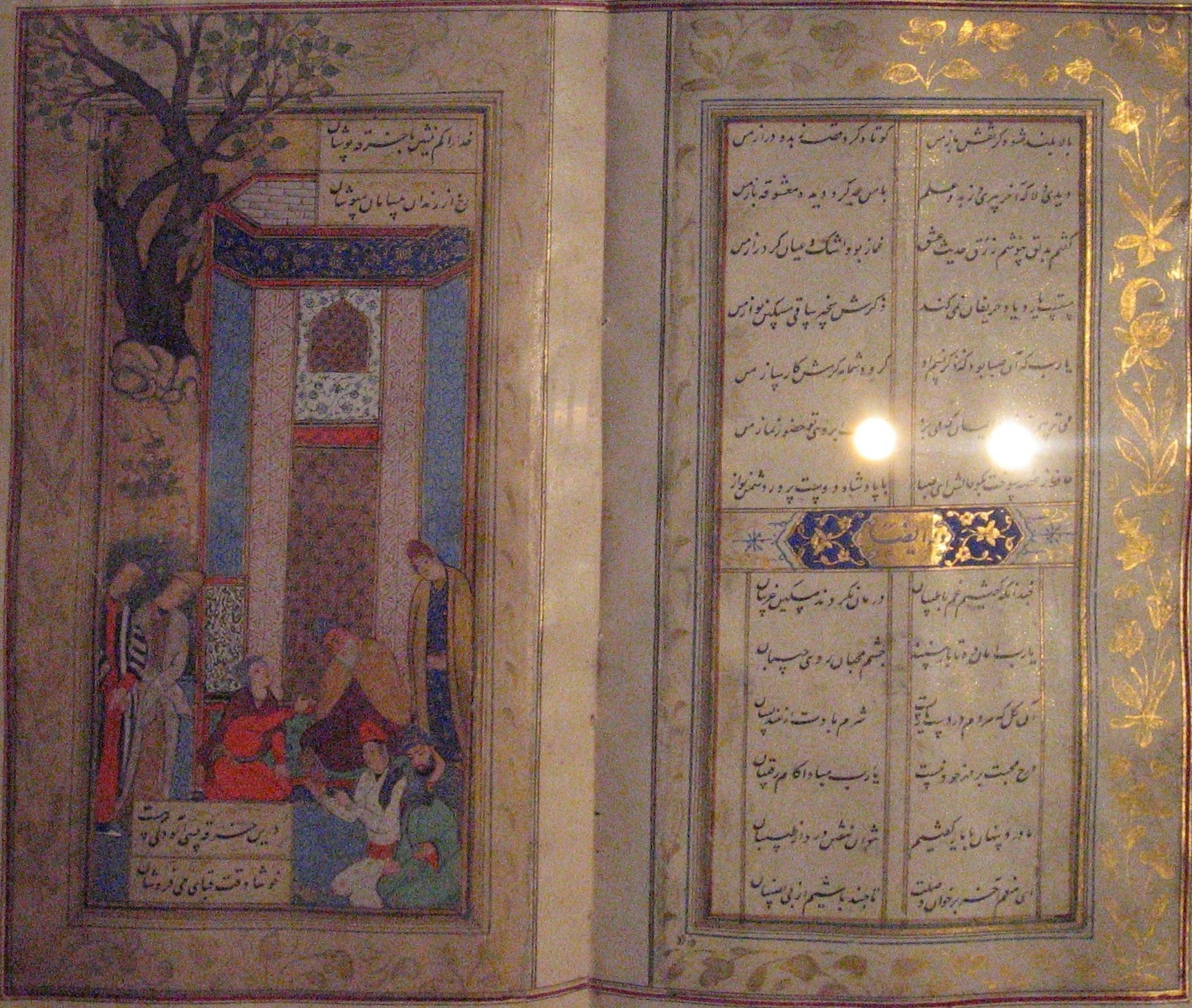
The Divan of Hafez, a master of the art of īhām. National Museum of Iran, Tehran, Persia.

Īhām (ایهام) in Persian, Urdu, Kurdish and Arabic poetry is a literary device in which an author uses a word, or an arrangement of words, that can be read in several ways. Each of the meanings may be logically sound, equally true, and intended.

== Definitions ==
In the 12th century, Rashid al-Din Vatvat defined īhām as follows: "Īhām in Persian means to create doubt. This is a literary device, also called takhyīl [to make one suppose and fancy], whereby a writer (dabīr), in prose, or a poet, in verse, employs a word with two different meanings, one direct and immediate (qarīb) and the other remote and strange (gharīb), in such a manner that the listener, as soon as he hears that word, thinks of its direct meaning while in actuality the remote meaning is intended."

Amir Khusrow (1253–1325 CE) introduced the notion that any of the several meanings of a word, or phrase, might be equally true and intended, creating a multilayered text. Discerning the various layers of meanings would be a challenge to the reader, who has to focus on and keep turning over the passage in his mind, applying his erudition and imagination to perceive alternative meanings.

Another idea associated with īhām is that a verse may function as a mirror of the reader's condition, as expressed by the 14th-century author Shaykh Maneri: "A verse by itself has no fixed meaning. It is the reader/listener who picks up an idea consistent with the subjective condition of his mind." The 15th-century poet Fawhr-e Din Nizami considered īhām an essential element of any good work of poetry: "A poem that doesn't have dual-meaning words, such a poem does not attract anyone at all—a poem without words of two senses."

== English example ==
In 2015, cartoonist Joe Sacco wrote something that comes close to an Īhām:

"When we draw a line, we are often crossing one too, because lines on paper are a weapon, and satire is meant to cut to the bone."

In this example, the reader initially takes "drawing a line" figuratively, as a counterpart of "crossing a line." Upon reflecting, the reader realizes that "drawing a line" here is used figuratively and metonymically, meaning "drawing the first element of a satirical cartoon on paper."

== Role ==
Īhām is an important stylistic device in Sufi literature, perfected by writers such as Hafez (1325/1326–1389/1390 CE). Nalî is an example of another poet who has used īhām widely in his poetry. Applications of this "art of ambiguity" or "amphibology" include texts that can be read as descriptions of earthly or divine love.

Haleh Pourafzal and Roger Montgomery, writing in Haféz: Teachings of the Philosopher of Love (1998), discuss īhām in terms of "biluminosity", simultaneous illumination from two directions, describing it as "a technique of comparison involving wordplay, sound association, and double entendre, keeping the reader in doubt as to the 'right' meaning of the word. Biluminosity removes the burden of choice and invites the reader to enter a more empowering dimension of īhām that embraces the quality of amphibians [...]—beings capable of living equally well in two radically different environments. As a result, the reader is freed from the obsession to find the 'right answer' through speculation and instead can concentrate on enjoying nuances and being awed by how the slightest shift in perception creates a new meaning. [...] From the perspective of Haféz as the composer of poetry, biluminosity allows two different points of view to shed light upon each other."

== See also ==
- Contronym
- Esoteric interpretation of the Quran
