= Logonym =

Neologism in linguistics

Logonym is a polysemic term, and a neologism (coined from Greek: λόγος / word, and Greek: ὄνομα / name). The term has several meanings, spanning across different fields of study. It was primarily defined as a term that designates various types of titles, including titles of literary and other artistic works, and also came to designate titles of business firms and their products, including their acronyms. The term also has a specific meaning in biological classification, and some authors have used the term as an alternative designation for the proper names of languages, but such use could not replace previously established onomastic terms (linguonyms, glossonyms, glottonyms), that are commonly used as designations for the onomastic class of language names.

== See also ==
- Linguonym
- -onym

== Sources ==
- Back, Otto (1988). "Glottonyme und Ethnonyme". Die Slawischen Sprachen. 14: 5–9.
- Goebl, Hans (1979). "Glottonymie, Glottotomie und Schizoglossie: Drei sprachpolitisch bedeutsame Begriffe" (PDF). Ladinia. 3: 7–38. doi:10.54218/ladinia.03.7-38. S2CID 239136530.
- Good, Jeff; Cysouw, Michael (2013). "Languoid, Doculect, and Glossonym: Formalizing the Notion Language" (PDF). Language Documentation & Conservation. 7: 331–359.
- Dubois, Alain (2000). "Synonymies and related lists in zoology: General proposals, with examples in herpetology". Dumerilia. 14 (2): 33–98.
- Kikvidze, Zaal (2013). "Lost and Acquired in Translation: Shades of Meaning in Language Names". General and Specialist Translation/Interpretation: Theory, Methods, Practice. Vol. 6. Kyiv. pp. 194–198.
- Klamer, Marian (2010). A Grammar of Teiwa. Berlin-New York: Walter de Gruyter. ISBN 9783110226072.
- Peetermans, Andy (2016). "Glottonymy as a could-be subfield of onomastics: Terminological considerations and historiographical applications". Annual Colloquium of the Henry Sweet Society. Cambridge: Pembroke College.
- Picone, Michael D. (2015). "French Dialects of Louisiana: A Revised Typology". New Perspectives on Language Variety in the South: Historical and Contemporary Approaches. Tuscaloosa: University of Alabama Press. pp. 267–287. ISBN 9780817318154.
- Room, Adrian (1996). An Alphabetical Guide to the Language of Name Studies. Lanham and London: The Scarecrow Press. ISBN 9780810831698.
- Wicklander, Dale R. (1978). Ethical Survey of Culture Media: Narration and Worksheets. Winston-Salem: Hunter. ISBN 9780894590412.
