= Homonym =

Words spelled or pronounced the same with different meanings

In linguistics, homonyms are words that are either homographs, words that mean different things but have the same spelling (regardless of pronunciation); or homophones, words that mean different things but have the same pronunciation (regardless of spelling). Using this definition, the words row (propel with oars), row (a linear arrangement) and row (an argument) are homonyms because they are homographs (though only the first two are homophones). So are the words see (vision) and sea (body of water), because they are homophones (though not homographs).

A more restrictive and technical definition requires that homonyms be simultaneously homographs and homophones—that is, they have identical spelling and pronunciation but different meanings. Examples include the pair stalk (part of a plant) and stalk (follow/harass a person) and the pair left (past tense of leave) and left (opposite of right).

A distinction is sometimes made between true homonyms, which are unrelated in origin, such as skate (glide on ice) and skate (the fish), and polysemous homonyms, or polysemes, which have a shared origin, such as mouth (of a river) and mouth (of an animal).

The relationship between a set of homonyms is called homonymy, and the associated adjective is homonymous, homonymic, or in Latin, equivocal. Additionally, the adjective homonymous can be used wherever two items share the same name, independent of how closely they are related in terms of their meaning or etymology. For example, the English word once (meaning 'one time') is homonymous (homographic) with the term for 'eleven' in Spanish, once.

== Etymology ==
The word homonym comes from the Greek ὁμώνυμος (homonymos), meaning 'having the same name', compounded from ὁμός (homos) 'common, same, similar' and ὄνομα (onoma) 'name'.

== Related terms ==
Term	Meaning	Spelling	Pronunciation
Homonym	Different	Same	Same
Homograph	Different	Same	(No requirement)
Homophone word	Different	(No requirement)	Same
Homophone phrase	Different	Different	Same to varying degree
Heteronym	Different	Same	Different
Heterograph	Different	Different	Same
Homophene	Different	(No requirement)	Same when lipread
Polyseme	Different but related	Same	(No requirement)
Capitonym	Different when capitalized	Same except for capitalization	(No requirement)
Synonym	Same	Different	Different
Antonym	Opposite	Different	Different
Contronym	Opposite	Same	(No requirement)
Synophone	Different	Different	Similar

Euler diagram showing the relationships between homonyms (between blue and green) and related linguistic concepts.

Several similar linguistic concepts are related to homonymy. These include:

- Homographs (literally "same writing") are usually defined as words that share the same spelling, regardless of how they are pronounced. (Note: Some sources restrict the term "homograph" to words that have the same spelling but different pronunciations. See, for example, The Blackwell Encyclopedia of Writing Systems, p. 215 (Wiley-Blackwell, 1999) and The Encyclopædia Britannica (14th Edition) (entry for "homograph").) If they are pronounced the same then they are also homophones (and homonyms) – for example, bark (the sound of a dog) and bark (the skin of a tree). If they are pronounced differently then they are also heteronyms – for example, bow (the front of a ship) and bow (a ranged weapon).
- Homophones (literally "same sound") are usually defined as words that share the same pronunciation, regardless of how they are spelled. (Note: Some sources restrict the term "homophone" to words that have the same pronunciation but different spellings. See, for example, The Blackwell Encyclopedia of Writing Systems, p. 202 (Wiley-Blackwell, 1999) and The Encyclopædia Britannica (14th Edition) (entry for "homograph").) If they are spelled the same then they are also homographs (and homonyms); if they are spelled differently then they are also heterographs (literally "different writing"). Homographic examples include rose (flower) and rose (past tense of rise). Heterographic examples include to, too, two, and there, their, they’re. Due to their similar yet non-identical pronunciation in American English, ladder and latter do not qualify as homophones, but rather synophones or homoiophones.
- Heteronyms (literally "different name") are the subset of homographs (words that share the same spelling) that have different pronunciations (and meanings). (Note: Some sources do not require that heteronyms have different pronunciations. See, for example, the archived Encarta dictionary entry (which states that heteronyms "often" differ in pronunciation) and the "Fun with Words" website (which states that heteronyms "sometimes" have different pronunciations).) Such words include desert (to abandon) and desert (arid region); tear (to rip) and tear (a drop of moisture formed in one eye); row (to argue or an argument) and row (as in to row a boat or a row of seats – a pair of homophones). Heteronyms are also sometimes called heterophones (literally "different sound").
- Homophenes (literally same appearance) are words that have different meanings and pronunciations, but look identical on the lips, rendering them indistinguishable in lipreading.
- Polysemes are words with the same spelling and distinct but related meanings. The distinction between polysemy and homonymy is often subtle and subjective, and not all sources consider polysemous words to be homonyms. Words such as mouth, meaning either the orifice on one's face, or the opening of a cave or river, are polysemous and may or may not be considered homonyms.
- Capitonyms are words that share the same spelling but have different meanings when capitalized (and may or may not have different pronunciations). Such words include polish (make shiny) and Polish (from Poland); march (walk in step) and March (the third month of the year) and the pair: reading (using a book) and Reading (the town in Berkshire, England).

== Further examples ==
A homonym that is both a homophone and a homograph is fluke, meaning:

- A fish, and a flatworm.
- The end parts of an anchor.
- The fins on a whale's tail.
- A stroke of luck.

These meanings represent at least three etymologically separate lexemes, but share the one form, fluke. Fluke is also a capitonym, in that Fluke Corporation (commonly referred to as simply "Fluke") is a manufacturer of industrial testing equipment.

Similarly, a river bank, a savings bank, a bank of switches, and a bank shot in the game of pool share a common spelling and pronunciation, but differ in meaning.

The words bow and bough are examples where there are two meanings associated with a single pronunciation and spelling (the weapon and the knot); two meanings with two different pronunciations (the knot and the act of bending at the waist), and two distinct meanings sharing the same sound but different spellings (bow, the act of bending at the waist, and bough, the branch of a tree). In addition, it has several related but distinct meanings – a bent line is sometimes called a 'bowed' line, reflecting its similarity to the weapon. Even according to the most restrictive definitions, various pairs of sounds and meanings of bow, Bow and bough are homonyms, homographs, homophones, heteronyms, heterographs, capitonyms and are polysemous.

- bow – a long stick with horse hair that is used to play certain string instruments such as the violin
- bow – to bend forward at the waist in respect (e.g. "bow down")
- bow – the front of the ship (e.g. "bow and stern")
- bow – a kind of tied ribbon (e.g. bow on a present, a bowtie)
- bow – to bend outward at the sides (e.g. a "bow-legged" cowboy)
- Bow – a district in London
- bow – a weapon to shoot projectiles with (e.g. a bow and arrow)

A lime can refer to a fruit or a material. A mold (mould) can refer to a fungus or an industrial cast.

The words there, their, and they're are examples of three words that are of a singular pronunciation, have different spellings and vastly different meanings. These three words are commonly misused (or, alternatively, misspelled).

- there – "The bow shot the arrow there," he said as he pointed.
- their – "It was their bow and arrow." the Mother said.
- they're – They're not going to get to shoot the bow again after puncturing the tire (tyre) on my car. (Contraction of They and Are.)

The words metal and meddle are polysemes and homophones, but not homographs.

== Homonyms in historical linguistics ==
Homonymy can lead to communicative conflicts and thus trigger lexical (onomasiological) change. This is known as homonymic conflict. This leads to a species of informal fallacy of thought and argument called by the latin name equivocation.

== See also ==
- False friends, words from different languages that appear similar but differ in meaning
- Synonyms, different words with identical or very similar meanings (conceptual inversion of "homonym")
- Riddle
- Word play
- Cognate
- Homophone
