= Oronym =

Oronym may refer to:

- Oronym (toponymy), a type of toponym, designating a proper name of a mountain or hill
- Same-sounding phrases, phrases that are pronounced similarly due to various homophonic effects

== See also ==
- Choronym
