= Realia (library science) =

Term in library science referring to three-dimensional objects

In library classification systems, realia are three-dimensional objects from real life such as coins, tools, and textiles, that do not fit into the traditional categories of library material. They can be either human-made (artifacts, tools, utensils, etc.) or naturally occurring (specimens, samples, etc.), usually borrowed, purchased, or received as donation by a teacher, library, or museum for use in classroom instruction or in exhibits.

Archival and manuscript collections often receive items of memorabilia such as badges, emblems, insignias, jewelry, leather goods, needlework, etc., in connection with gifts of personal papers. Most government or institutional archives reject gifts of non-documentary objects, unless they have a documentary value. When accepting large bequests of mixed objects, they normally have the donors sign legal documents giving permission to the archive to destroy, exchange, sell, or dispose in any way those objects which, according to the best judgement of the archivist, are not manuscripts (which can include typescripts or printouts) or are not immediately useful for understanding the manuscripts.

Recently, the usage of this term has been criticized by librarians based on the usage of the term realia to refer to artistic and historical artifacts and objects. The noun phrase "real world object" has been suggested as a better term for describing the broader categories of three-dimensional objects in libraries.

== Treatment in libraries ==
Most libraries usually have a well written, legally tight acquisitions policy that rejects beforehand any object which is not some kind of print or text-based document. There are some exceptions. Children's libraries sometimes have a toy collection, whose individual items are lent out after being cataloged as realia, or under a more specific material designation such as toy, or game. Some large libraries have a special mandate to keep objects related to a literary collection.

Some very large libraries have a public relations department, which can find museum objects useful for enhancing or promoting the general collection. Such a library is more likely to prize realia for their associations with writers, subjects, or themes in the library's collections, rather than for their own intrinsic worth, artistic merit, historical significance, or scientific value. Examples might include a feather pen believed to have been owned by John Hancock; lead type from Benjamin Franklin's printing press; or a collection of Vietnam War era canteens, mess kits, uniforms, combat boots, etc. used in a "hands on" exhibit for children to illustrate the war.

Within the restricted domain of cataloging rules in the field of library and information science, the term "realia" is used to describe those mass-produced objects that incorporate documents or significant amounts of text (such as world globes, decks of quiz cards, and board games), but which have a format which makes it hard to incorporate them in the general collection or to describe them easily in the catalog. Special cataloguing rules are available to describe these objects.

Objects of realia, due to their diverse and compound nature, pose unique preservation challenges for libraries and archives. Unlike books and other traditional library materials, the artifactual value of these materials is key. In fact, when such items are unaccompanied by written documentation, as is often the case, the intellectual value sought by most library collections is often uncertain.

“We have a lot of hair,” Saundra Taylor of the Lilly Library told The New York Times, explaining that realia such as locks of hair, toys, and inkwells are often the unsolicited accompaniment to prized acquisitions of personal papers or book collections. Some libraries prize their realia, actively preserving and exhibiting it, while others simply keep it out of light and hope for the best.

Often, realia are seen as a nuisance, difficult not only to catalog, but to care for. Unlike books, which are mostly cellulose (paper, boards, natural fibers) and occasionally leather, realia are often the sum of many parts. One exasperating group of items that might find their way into library collections are textiles and handcrafts: hair, needlework, clothing.

== Textile fibers ==
=== Hair, wool, and silk ===
Little research has been conducted regarding the preservation and conservation of human hair within the context of the archival world. However, much is known of the chemical structure and behavior of human hair, thanks in large part to the cosmetology industry; there is certainly a great deal of scholarship surrounding the care of other protein-based fibers, silk, and wool.

Loose, braided, tied lovingly in silk ribbons, hair was memorialized especially by the Victorians. Often, hair would be encased within a glass or woven with metallic threads, paired with a metal setting to be worn as mourning jewelry, a memento of a friend or loved one. Hairwork, an art still practiced today by the Victorian Hairwork Society, was a popular needlework method, often resulting in two-dimensional mourning wreaths and graveyard scenes, worked in hair on a fabric ground. Wool, because of its ability to wick moisture and resist flame, was commonly used in Western textiles throughout history, and might present itself in the form of bed linens, clothing, and needlework.

Hair (both human and animal) mainly consists of a protein, keratin, the fibers of which give the inner core of hair a great deal of strength. Hydrogen bonds and disulfide bonds link the chained amino acids that make up hair. Hydrogen bonds break and re-form easily on exposure to water, but disulfide bonds (responsible for curl, among other properties), can be broken only via chemical means. Under examination with a microspectrophotometer, scientists have discovered that high heat, UV exposure, and even artificial lighting can be quite damaging to human hair.

Wool, too, suffers in the sun—the fleece of sheep allowed to spend too much time in the sun before shearing accepts little dye when sheared from their backs, compared to their underbellies, as a result of disulfide bonds broken by UV light. Heat and a wide variety of insects, too, are deleterious to woolen textiles. Wool has a high resistance, however, to fungi and bacteria, provided it is free from sizing and soaps; further, wool can absorb three times its volume in water and requires a bit of humidity to remain viable.

Silk, another protein-rich fiber, is the most problematic of textiles. Often “weighted” with metallic salts to produce a nicer drape in clothing, silks (especially black silks and silks used in trimmings) rarely hold up to washing and repeated handling. Unlike other proteins, silk is not flame retardant. It quickly becomes brittle when kept in hot, dry conditions, and is highly susceptible to rot when in warm, humid climes.

=== Compound textiles ===
Cellulose fibers, like cotton, linen, and hemp, behave differently from protein-based fibers. Linen and cotton, for instance, comprised most papers for many centuries. Clothing and handcrafts were often made with linen or cotton. Needlework was often done with silk, wool, or hair on a linen or cotton ground. Hairwork, silk embroidery, and wool embroidery pose special problems, due to the makeup of their parts. In diffused light, all fibers deteriorate rapidly, compared to those stored in the dark. However, cotton and linen resist temperature well. Cotton can be stored in temperatures well above 100 degrees and still remain chemically and physically stable. With these varying degrees of chemical and physical degradation, textiles woven from a blend of fibers, or art pieces created using a variety of fibers, deteriorate unevenly. Storage of wool and silk, for example in the ideal condition for one, might have a negative effect on the other.

=== Preservation of textiles ===
All textiles react negatively to air pollution, light, extremes of temperature, and humidity. Rapid changes in the environment can cause undue stress for these natural fibers, causing them to expand and contract as they take on moisture if kept in humid conditions, to dry out in high heat. Chemical bonds are broken by the machinations of UV light and chemicals in polluted air. As with other, more traditional, library materials, temperature and humidity should be kept within a steady range if at all possible: 70 (± 5 degrees) degrees Fahrenheit and 50% (± 5%) relative humidity is suggested by most sources. Pre-conditioned silica gel used for the purpose of humidity control should never come into direct contact with textiles.

Textiles should be stored in darkness, and exhibited in dim light with UV filtration. To avoid acid-migration, textiles should not come into contact with wood or cardboard. Acid-free tissue or muslin are often used to shield textiles from harmful lignins.

Storage options for textiles are manifold. Small items, such as locks of hair, fragments of cloth, or lace can be stored flat, sandwiched between sheets of tissue or encapsulated in mylar. Larger items tend to deteriorate at points of stress, due to folding or gravity pulling the fibers from one another. Finch and Putnam recommend rolling on plastic tubing or covered cardboard, or shaping over dummies. Clothing is often stored or shaped around specially created forms that support the textile fully while it is displayed or even hanged.
