= Ergonym =

An ergonym is a proper name or title of an organization, that reflects its function (for example, business associations, learned institutions, industrial companies, agencies, banks, shops, cultural institutions, sports complexes and stadia). An ergonym is a unit of the linguistic space of a city.

An ergonym may be an important marker of sociocultural processes, and is one of the mirrors in which history and everyday life are reflected. To study the ergonyms of a place is to paint its linguistic portrait, describing the typical and individual aspects of its onomastic space, and making a snapshot of its everyday life.

== Etymology ==
The term ergonym was first used in 1978 by the Russian linguist N. V. Podolskaya.

The term is derived from Ancient Greek ergo 'work, trade' and nym 'name, title'. However, ergon can also be translated as 'work' or 'action'.

== Definitions ==
There are different understandings of the term "ergonym". Some Latvian linguists consider it a proper noun, meaning an association of people (such as an organization, a company, or educational institution) created for a specific purpose.

In Russia, which has a long tradition of studying ergonyms, the term is defined in a similar way, as a proper noun denoting an association of people united by a specific direction and type of activity. Russian linguists define ergonyms as names that indicate the functional sphere of the association formed for the purpose of a certain action.

In German linguistics, the term is used to refer not only to the associations or unions of individuals, but also to names of goods and services (e.g., groceries, clothes and cars), names of works of art, publications, broadcast items, children's toys, and the names of retail outlets such as cafés, shops, and hairdressers.

In Finland, researchers rarely use the term, and prefer "company name", "name in public space" or "commercial name". But for others, the concept of ergonym may be somewhat broader than that of merely a trading name or trademark. In their view, "ergonym" also describes the names of institutions such as schools, theatres, churches, and bureaucratic organizations.

== Examples ==
Type	Examples
hotel	Hotel Carlton, Auberge de Soleil, Mandarin Oriental
corporation	General Motors, Giant Bicycles, Samsung Electronics
flag carrier	British Airways, Brussels Airlines, EgyptAir
organization	the Common Market, United Nations, International Committee of the Red Cross
agency	the Federal Bureau of Investigation, Global Travel International, Best Day Tour
shop	CentralWorld, Missguided, Pretty Little Thing
school	Burgess Hill Girls, CATS Canterbury, Woodcote House School
hospital	Great Ormond Street Hospital, Ronald Reagan UCLA Medical Center, Johns Hopkins Hospital
cinema	The Screen On The Green, Greenwich Picturehouse, CinemaPark
café	Le Dome Cafe, Grand Cafe, Café Central
beauty salon	Thompson & Co, Salon Next, Fashion Look Studio
library	New York Public Library, State Library of Victoria, Trinity College Library
theatre	Grauman's Chinese Theater, Boston Opera House, Palau de la Música Catalana
stadium	Wembley Stadium, Santiago Bernabeu Stadium, Old Trafford Stadium
fitness centres	Metroflex Gym, Original Temple Gym, Firehouse Fitness
banks	C. Hoare & Co., Barclays Bank, Weglin & Co.

== Formation ==
Ergonyms can be formed in different ways. Some linguists propose a classification of formation. This classification includes:

1. Affixation, for example, "Интермебель, Супертрубы" ("Intermebel Super Pipes").
2. Compounding, where an ergonym is formed by a combination of two or more word stems. For example, "KinoRooms", "MissAmor".
3. Abbreviation, for example "DHL", "DNS", "V&L".
4. Ergonyms can be created with the help of a numerical component such as "Boutique No. 7, est. 1910".
5. Ergonyms that have unknown meaning or origin, such as "Bershka", "Oodji", "Kari".

Other linguists propose a different classification that includes:

1. Ergonyms formed from adjectives, verbs, participles, numerals, adverbs, particles, interjections. For example, "Rendez-vous", "Déjà vu", "Respect".
2. Ergonyms in the form of phrases and sentences. Names of two or more words are more informative and semantically expanded. For example, "Petit cafe", "C'est la Vie", "Shaping Queen".
3. Plays on words. These form the largest class. For example, Любовь-морковь, Кроваткино.
4. Ergonyms formed from anthroponyms ("Cleopatra"), toponyms ("Olympus"), mythonyms, the names of living things, These may be explained by their being easily recognized by many people, by their having many different meanings, and by the implication that their characteristics are transferred to the ergonomical entity.
5. Ergonyms formed from obsolete words, jargon or slang. For example, "Очкарик, Ёшкин Кот"
6. Loanwords. For example, "Angel", "Nota Bene", "Бонжур".

== Function ==
An ergonym may have functions beside being a proper name. It might also be:

1. Informative (the name acts as an extremely informative unit in the speech of each communicant)
2. Advertising (the name is intended to attract interest, to encourage the response of a potential client)
3. Aesthetic (the name usually evokes a positive association, “sounds beautiful”)
4. Memorial (the names often reflect the names of the founders, the names of popular music groups, films, etc.)
5. Denoting property protection such as a trademark.
