= Real world object =

Non-text-based items in library science

Real world objects in the context of library science include library non-text-based equipment, tools, devices, and other three-dimensional objects that the user handles, manipulates, or may observe tactilely, and that allow him or her to gain experience and knowledge about the device, learn about how the real world functions, or access digital tools and content. Real world objects originated as a phrase used in computer science in the artificial intelligence community, but has slowly been gaining traction in library science. These items have also been called or associated with names such as non-bibliographic materials, “realia”, non-book materials, non-library materials, three-dimensional objects, and other terms.

The use of "real-world objects" as a phrase in library science has come about partially as a result of the ongoing connection between computer technologies and communities with librarians. Additionally, realia has come to mean historical and artistic artifacts, often kept in museums and archives, and have a prevailing paradigm that sanctions against touch and has been inextricably linked with the Whitworth Art Gallery's Tactile project rather than based on bibliographic based architectures such as BIBFRAME.

== See also ==
- Realia (library science)
