= Experience (disambiguation) =

Experience is the process through which conscious organisms perceive the world around them.

Experience may also refer to:

== Arts and entertainment ==
=== Music ===
- The Jimi Hendrix Experience (1966–69), a rock band, led by guitarist Jimi Hendrix, sometimes known as "The Experience".
- Experience (Jimi Hendrix album) (1971)
- Experience (Lincoln Thompson album) (1979)
- Experience (The Prodigy album) (1992)
- Experience (Jodie Christian album) (1992)
- The Experience (Yolanda Adams album), 2001
- Experience: Jill Scott 826+ (2001), a live double album by American R&B-soul singer–songwriter Jill Scott
- Experience (York album) (2001), by German electronic act York
- Experience (2001), by DJ Project
- Experience (World Saxophone Quartet album) (2004)
- The Experience (gospel concert), a gospel music concert in Nigeria
- "Experience" (Diana Ross song), 1985
- "Experience" (Victoria Monét, Khalid and SG Lewis song)
- "Experience", a song by Gentle Giant on their 1973 album In a Glass House
- "Experience", a song by Ludovico Einaudi on his 2013 album In a Time Lapse

=== Other ===
- "Experience" (essay), an 1844 essay by Ralph Waldo Emerson
- Experience (book), a 2000 book of memoirs by Martin Amis
- Experience (1921 film), a lost drama film starring Leslie Banks
- The Experience (film), a 1973 Iranian short feature film directed by Abbas Kiarostami
- Michael Jackson: The Experience, a 2010 music video game based on Michael Jackson's music
- Experience points in role playing games
- "Experiences", the official name for Roblox games
- Experience, a magazine published by Northeastern University

== People ==
- Experience Estabrook (1813–1894), an American attorney and legal administrator
- Experience Mayhew (1673–1758), a New England missionary
- Martin Expérience (born 1999), a French-born footballer
- The Experience (professional wrestling), a wrestling tag team

== Other uses ==
- Conscious experience, see Consciousness
- Customer experience, a marketing concept
- Samsung Experience, a software overlay by Samsung
- User experience, reactions to using a particular product, system or service
- Work experience, experience that a person gains while working in a specific field, and especially voluntary activity where young people - often students - can get a feel for a professional working environment
- A memorable event sold as a product in the experience economy

== See also ==
- Experienced (album), a 2011 live CD and DVD by Boom Boom Satellites
- Experiences (album), an album by X Marks the Pedwalk
- Process philosophy
- Thee Experience, a Hollywood night club in 1969
- X-Perience, a German Eurodance group
