= Contronym =

Word that has two opposing meanings

A contronym is a word with two opposite meanings. For example, the word weather can mean to "withstand", or to "wear away". Since a contronym has at least two meanings, it is by definition polysemic.

== Linguistics ==
=== Etymology ===
The word combines the prefix contr(a)- (from the Latin contrā) and the suffix -onym (from international scientific vocabulary).

It was coined in 1962 by Jack Herring. The vowel of a suffix generally supersedes the vowel of a prefix, hence it being written as contronym instead of contranym.

=== Nomenclature ===
A contronym is alternatively called an autantonym, autoantonymy, auto-antonym, antagonym, antilogy, contranym, enantiodrome (enantio- means "opposite"), enantionym, enantioseme, Janus word (after the Roman god Janus, who is usually depicted with two faces), or self-antonym.

== Examples ==
=== English ===
- Cleave can mean "to cling" or "to split apart".
- Clip can mean "attach" or "cut off".
- Drop can mean "release or make available" (e.g. a music record) or "abandon or discontinue".
- Dust can mean "to remove dust" (e.g. to clean a house) or "to add dust" (e.g. to dust a cake with powdered sugar). This contradiction features in the children's book Amelia Bedelia.
- Fast can mean "without moving; fixed in place", (holding fast, fastened, also as in "steadfast"), or "moving quickly".
- Obbligato in music traditionally means a passage is "obligatory" but has also been used to mean "optional".
- Overlook and oversight can mean making an accidental omission or error, but they can also be used to mean a close scrutiny or control.
- Peruse can mean to "consider with attention and in detail" or "look over or through in a casual or cursory manner".
- Ravel can mean "to separate" (e.g. threads in cloth) or "to entangle".
- Sanction can mean "to give approval" or "to impose a penalty upon".
- Table can mean "to discuss a topic at a meeting" (British English) or "to postpone discussion of a topic" (American English). Canadian English uses both meanings of the word.

Denotations and connotations of words can drift or branch over centuries. An apocryphal story relates how Charles II (or sometimes Queen Anne) described St Paul's Cathedral (using contemporaneous English) as "amusing, awful, and artificial", with the meaning (rendered in modern English) of "amazing, awe-inspiring, and artistic".

=== Other languages ===
==== Verbs ====
- The Romanian verb a închiria, the French verb louer, the Afrikaans verb huur, the Finnish verb vuokrata and the Spanish alquilar and arrendar mean "to rent" (as the lessee does) as well as "to let" (as the lessor does). The English verb rent can also describe either the lessee's or the lessor's role.
- In Spanish dar (basic meaning "to give"), when applied to lessons or subjects, can mean "to teach", "to take classes" or "to recite", depending on the context. Similarly with the French verb apprendre, which usually means "to learn" but may refer to the action of teaching someone. Dutch leren and Afrikaans leer can mean "to teach" or "to learn".
- In Hebrew the root נכר can mean "to recognize" or "to be a stranger [to not be recognized]" (Marcus Jastrow, A Dictionary of the Targumim, the Talmud Babli and Yerushalmi, and the Midrashic Literature. New York: Pardes, 1950, vol. II,911-912). The root appears 4 times in Genesis 42:7-8 (Jonathan Sacks, The Koren Shalem Humash with Rashi and Onkelos. Jerusalem: Koren Publishers, 2025, 305).
- In Greek some verbs that begin with the prefix "από-" (apo-) can have a contranym meaning. A prominent example is the verb "αποφράζω" means "to plug something, to fill a hole", and is usually used as a medical term, based on the original ancient Greek meaning. The more modern Greek meaning is "to unplug something, remove a blockage". Similar verbs are "απογεμίζω", that can both mean "to fill up to a brim" and "to empty completely" and "απομαθαίνω", that can both mean "to learn something very well" and "to forget something I learned". The meaning that negates the main action, is usually a more modern Greek one. The prefix "apo-" sometimes enhances an action and sometimes negates it.
- There are two Latin verbs deformo, one meaning "to bring into shape", the other meaning "to bring out of shape".
- Arabic: صَوَّبَ, romanized: ṣawwaba can mean "to deem [something] wrong and set it right; to correct" and "to deem something correct".

==== Adverbs ====
- Icelandic: fram eftir can mean "toward the sea" or "away from the sea" depending on dialect.
- Irish: ar ball can mean "a while ago" or "in a little bit/later on"

==== Adjectives ====
- The Latin sinister lit. 'left' meant both "auspicious" and "inauspicious", within the respective Roman and Greek traditions of augury. The negative meaning was carried on into French and ultimately English.
- Latin nimius means "excessive, too much". It maintained this meaning in Spanish nimio, but it was also misinterpreted as "insignificant, without importance".
- In Korean, 연패 (yeonpae) means either "consecutive losses" (the Sino-Korean word 連敗) or "consecutive wins" (orthographic borrowing of Japanese 連覇).
- In Vietnamese, minh means among other things "bright, clear" (from Sino-Vietnamese 明) and "dead, gloomy" (from 冥). Because of this, the name of the dwarf planet Pluto is not adapted from 冥王星 as in Chinese, Japanese and Korean.
- In Japanese, 適当 (tekitou) can mean both "suitable, proper" and "sloppy, careless".
- Spanish dichoso meant originally "blissful, fortunate" as in tierra dichosa, "fortunate land". However it developed an ironic and colloquial meaning "bothersome, unlucky", as in ¡Dichosas moscas!, "Damned flies!".

==== Nouns ====
- Arabic mawlā means both master and slave.

==== In translation ====
Seeming contronyms can arise from translation. In Hawaiian, for example, aloha is translated both as "hello" and as "goodbye", but the essential meaning of the word is "love", whether used as a greeting or farewell. Similarly, 안녕 (annyeong) in Korean and שלום (shalom) in Hebrew can mean both "hello" and "goodbye" but the central meaning is "peace". The Italian greeting ciao is translated as "hello" or "goodbye" depending on the context; the original meaning was "at your service" (literally "(I'm your) slave"). In Hungarian, "szervusz" serves a similar double role.

== See also ==
- X mark, which can either be synonymous or antonymous with a check mark in various contexts
- Īhām, ambiguity used as a literary device in Middle Eastern poetry
- -onym, suffix denoting a class of names
- Oxymoron, contradiction used as a figure of speech
- Semantics
- Skunked term, a term that becomes difficult to use because it is evolving from one meaning to another, or is otherwise controversial
