= Ethnonym =

Identifier or designation referring to ethnicity

An ethnonym (from Ancient Greek ἔθνος (éthnos) 'nation' and ὄνομα (ónoma) 'name') is a name applied to a given ethnic group. Ethnonyms can be divided into two categories: exonyms (whose name of the ethnic group has been created by another group of people) and autonyms, or endonyms (whose name is created and used by the ethnic group itself).

For example, the dominant ethnic group of Germany is the Germans. The ethnonym Germans is a Latin-derived exonym used in the English language, but the Germans call themselves Deutsche, an endonym. The German people are identified by a variety of exonyms across Europe, such as Allemands (French), tedeschi (Italian), tyskar (Swedish), and Niemcy (Polish).

As a sub-field of anthroponymy, the study of ethnonyms is called ethnonymy or ethnonymics.

== Variations ==
Numerous ethnonyms can apply to the same ethnic or racial group, with various levels of recognition, acceptance and use. The State Library of South Australia contemplated this issue when considering Library of Congress headings for literature pertaining to Aboriginal and Torres Strait Islander people. Some 20 different ethnonyms were considered as potential Library of Congress headings, but it was recommended that only a fraction of them be employed for the purposes of cataloguing.

== Change over time ==
Ethnonyms can change in character over time; while originally socially acceptable, they may come to be considered offensive, or become ethnic slurs. For instance, the term gypsy has been used to refer to the Romani. Other examples include Vandal, Bushman, Barbarian, and Philistine.

The ethnonyms applied to African Americans have demonstrated a greater evolution; older terms such as colored carried negative connotations and have been replaced by modern-day equivalents such as Black or African American. Other ethnonyms such as Negro have a different status. The term was considered acceptable in its use by activists such as Martin Luther King Jr. in the 1960s, but other activists took a different perspective. In discussing an address in 1960 by Elijah Muhammad, it was stated "to the Muslims, terms like Negro and colored are labels created by white people to negate the past greatness of the black race".

Four decades later, a similar difference of opinion remains. In 2006, one commentator suggested that the term Negro is outdated or offensive in many quarters; similarly, the word "colored" still appears in the name of the NAACP, or National Association for the Advancement of Colored People.

In such contexts, ethnonyms are susceptible to the phenomenon of the euphemism treadmill.

== Morphology and typology ==
In English, ethnonyms are generally formulated through suffixation; most ethnonyms for toponyms ending in -a are formed by adding -n: Bulgaria, Bulgarian; Estonia, Estonian. In English, in many cases, the name for the dominant language of a group is identical to their English-language ethnonym; the French speak French, the Germans speak German. This is sometimes erroneously overgeneralized; it may be assumed that people from India speak "Indian", despite there being no language in India which is called by that name.

Generally, any group of people may have numerous ethnonyms, associated with the political affiliation with a state or a province, with geographical landmark, with the language, or another distinct feature. Ethnonym may be a compound word related to origin or usage.

A polito-ethnonym indicates that name originated from the political affiliation, like when the polysemic term Austrians is sometimes used more specifically for native, German speaking inhabitants of Austria, who have their own endonyms.

A topo-ethnonym refers to the ethnonym derived from a toponym (name of a geographical locality, placename), like when the polysemic term Montenegrins, which was originally used for the inhabitants of the geographical area of the Black Mountain (Montenegro), acquired an additional ethnonymic use, designating modern ethnic Montenegrins, who have their own distinct endonyms. Classical geographers frequently used topo-ethnonyms (ethnonyms formed from toponyms) as substitute for ethnonyms in general descriptions, or for unknown endonyms.

Compound terminology is widely used in professional literature to discriminate semantics of the terms.

== Related terms ==
In onomastic studies, there are several terms that are related to ethnonyms, like the term ethnotoponym, that designates a specific toponym (placename) that is formed from an ethnonym. Many names of regions and countries are ethnotoponyms.

== See also ==
- -onym
- Demonym
- Diaspora studies
- Ethnonymic surname
- Hyphenated American
- Onomastics
- Confessionym
- Ethnic slur

== Sources ==
- Coates, Richard (2021). "Some thoughts on the theoretical status of ethnonyms and demonyms". Onomastica. 65 (2): 5–19. doi:10.17651/ONOMAST.65.2.1.
- Roberts, Michael (2017). "The semantics of demonyms in English: Germans, Queenslanders, and Londoners". In Zhengdao Ye (ed.). The Semantics of Nouns. Oxford: Oxford University Press. pp. 205–220. ISBN 978-0-19-873672-1.
- Room, Adrian (1996). An Alphabetical Guide to the Language of Name Studies. Lanham and London: The Scarecrow Press. ISBN 0-8108-3169-4.
- Tuite, Kevin (1995). "The declension of ethnonyms in English". Proceedings of the Berkeley Linguistics Society. 21: 491–502. doi:10.3765/bls.v21i1.1420.
