= Ethnotaxonomy =

The term ethnotaxonomy refers either to that subdiscipline within ethnology which studies the taxonomic systems defined and used by individual ethnic groups, or to the operative individual taxonomy itself, which is the object of the ethnologist's immediate study.

For example, in many West African languages, the perceptual world of color is classified into the principal categories "Red," "White," and "Black" (finer gradations being secondary). The range of wavelengths that an English-speaker calls blue would be a subcategory of "Black." (See also Blue–green distinction in language)

The set of categories of familial relationships evinced by the ethnic group's kinship system is another ethnotaxonomy. An example of this might be the Hawaiian kinship system, where all members of a generation of the same sex are referred to by a single term. Both the relationships termed mother and aunt in English fall into the same taxon "Mother-Aunt". This does not mean that the users of this taxonomy are confused about the concept "Birth-Mother," only that it is a subcategory.

Conversely, an ethnotaxonomy such as the Sudanese kinship system or that used in ancient Rome, where no two relationships have the same denotation, may show much more granularity than the English system. Thus the relationship called aunt in English is not fundamental in Latin, but either amita "Father's Sister" or matertera "Mother's Sister" must be chosen. Latin and Sudanese are called a "descriptive systems," and Hawaiian is called a "classificatory" system, but this terminology is English-centered (see Lewis H. Morgan), the difference being one of degree, rather than kind.

Categories of plants, "Useful" and "Harmful," etc., are yet another well-known example. Indeed, in recent years there has been a vogue usage of the term ethnotaxonomy limiting it to ethnobotany and ethnopharmacology, because of the "rediscovery" of the medicinal and commercial value of plants disclosed by examining the botanical ethnotaxonomies of lesser-known cultures.

Animal folk taxonomy in the Kalam language of Papua New Guinea has been extensively studied by Ralph Bulmer and others.

Starting in the 1970s, several folk taxonomists suggested that folk taxa (and their names) displayed characteristics that suggested that they belonged to cryptic taxonomic ranks, and some recent ethnozoological studies still support the existence of such ranks. However, the existence of such ranks has been contested by systematists, including some specialists of biological (taxonomic) nomenclature.

== See also ==
- Folk taxonomy
