= Capitonym =

Word that changes meaning when capitalized

A capitonym is a word that changes its meaning (and sometimes pronunciation) when it is capitalized; the capitalization usually applies due to one form being a proper noun or eponym. It is a portmanteau of the word capital with the suffix -onym. A capitonym is a form of homograph and – when the two forms are pronounced differently – is also a form of heteronym. In situations where both words should be capitalized (such as the beginning of a sentence), there will be nothing to distinguish between them except the context in which they are used.

Although some pairs, such as march and March, are completely unrelated, in other cases, such as august and catholic, the capitalized form is a name that is etymologically related to the uncapitalized form. For example, August derives from the name of Imperator Augustus, who named himself after the word augustus, whence English august came. Likewise, both Catholic and catholic derive from a Greek adjective meaning "universal".

Capital letters may be used to differentiate between a set of objects and a particular example of that object. For instance in astronomical terminology a distinction may be drawn between a moon, any natural satellite, and the Moon, the natural satellite of Earth.

== In English ==
=== Philosophical, religious, and political terms ===
A particular example of where capitonyms are prominent is in terminology relating to philosophy, religion, and politics. Capitalized words are often used to differentiate a philosophical concept from how the concept is referred to in everyday life, or to demonstrate respect for an entity or institution.

Words for transcendent ideas in the Platonic sense are often capitalized, especially when used in a religious context. Examples include "Good", "Beauty", "Truth" or "the One".

The word "god" is capitalized to "God" when referring to the single deity of monotheistic religions such as Christianity, Judaism, or Islam, and common to capitalize pronouns related to God (He, Him, His, etc.) as well; this practice is followed by many versions of the Bible, such as the NKJV. In this tradition, possessive pronouns are also capitalized if one is quoting God; "My" and "Mine" are capitalized, which should not be done when a human speaks. The pronouns "You", "Your", and "Yours" are also sometimes capitalized in reference to God. Other distinctions sometimes made include church (meaning a building) and Church (meaning an organization or group of people), and the liturgical Mass, versus the physical mass.

As political parties are often named after philosophies or ideologies, a capital letter is used to differentiate between a supporter of the philosophy, and a supporter of the party, for instance Liberal, a supporter of any Liberal Party, and liberal, a supporter of the philosophy of liberalism. Terms such as "small-l liberal" may be used to indicate the concept that an individual supports. Similar examples are conservative/Conservative, democrat/Democrat, libertarian/Libertarian, republican/Republican, socialist/Socialist, communist/Communist, and a supporter of labour/Labour.

=== List of capitonyms in English ===
The following list includes only "dictionary words" or lemma. Personal names (Mark/mark, Will/will), place-names (China/china, Turkey/turkey), company names (Fiat/fiat), names of publications (Time/time) etc. are all excluded as too numerous to list. Adjectives distinct from placenames (e.g. Polish/polish) are allowed. Pairs in which one word is simply a secondary meaning of the other – e.g. Masonry (secret society), which is in essence a peculiar use of the word masonry (wall building) – are omitted.

Capitalised word	Lowercase word	Notes
Arabic: of or relating to the Arabic language or Arabic literature	arabic: gum arabic, also called gum acacia, a food ingredient	
Ares (/ˈɛəriːz/): god of war	ares (/ˈɑːrz/ or /ˈɛərz/): plural of are, a metric unit of area	Different pronunciations
August (/ˈɔːɡəst/): the eighth month of the year	august (/ɔːˈɡʌst/): majestic or venerable	Different pronunciations
Bohemian: Relating to Bohemia	bohemian: Socially unconventional	
Cancer: a constellation and astrological sign, or a genus of crab	cancer: a class of diseases	
Catholic: Of the Western Christian Catholic Church, as differentiated from e.g. the Eastern Orthodox Church	catholic: Universal; all-encompassing.	
Celt (/kɛlt/, /sɛlt/): A member of one of the Celtic peoples who speak Celtic languages.	celt (/sɛlt/): A prehistoric chisel-bladed tool.	Often different pronunciations
Cuban: from Cuba	cuban: relating to cubes, as in cuban prime (rare technical use)	
Divine: relating to God	divine: to discover by intuition or insight; to locate water, minerals, etc.; a theologian	In lower case, the word can take either meaning
French: from France	french: to engage in French kissing or to prepare food by cutting it into strips	The definitions come from the stereotypes of the French being passionate lovers and French cuisine being sophisticated respectively.
Gallic: relating to France or to the ancient territory of Gaul	gallic: relating to galls (abnormal plant growths) or gallic acid	
Hamlet: A play by William Shakespeare, or the play's protagonist	hamlet: a small town	
Ionic: relating to Ionia or to a style of classical architecture	ionic: relating to (chemical) ions	
Job (/dʒoʊb/): biblical figure in the Book of Job	job (/dʒɒb/): a paid position of regular employment	Different pronunciations
Lent: the period between Ash Wednesday and Easter	lent: past tense and participle of to lend	
Mandarin: a Sinitic language spoken in northern and western China, especially in and around Beijing	mandarin: a member of an elite or powerful group or class, as in intellectual or cultural milieus; also, a type of citrus fruit	
March: the third month of the year	march: to walk briskly and rhythmically	
May: the fifth month of the year	may: modal verb	
Mobile (/moʊˈbiːl/): A city in Alabama	mobile (/ˈmoʊbəl/ or /ˈmoʊbaɪl/): capable of being moved	The city comes from the name of a native American tribe
Mosaic: Relating to Moses	mosaic: a kind of decoration	
Muse: One of the nine Greek goddesses involved with the arts, music, poetry, etc.	muse: A person who serves as inspiration for artistic endeavours; also, to ponder reflectively over.	
Pole: a Polish person	pole: a long, thin cylindrical object; various other meanings	Pole is not etymologically related to pole: The Old English word for "pole" was spelled pal with a short a (compare ModE stone and OE stan).
Polish (/ˈpoʊlɪʃ/): from Poland	polish (/ˈpɒlɪʃ/): to create a shiny surface by rubbing; a compound used in that process	Different pronunciations
Reformed: of the Protestant Christianity typically associated with John Calvin	reformed: past tense and participle of to reform; corrected or amended	
Scot: a native of Scotland	scot: a payment, charge, assessment, or tax	
Scotch: from or relating to Scotland, or a form of whisky	scotch: to put an end to something (especially rumours); also the form of whisky	
Swede: a person from Sweden or of Swedish descent	swede: the yellow root of Brassica napus	
Welsh: from or relating to Wales	welsh: to renege (on an agreement)	The verb welsh (also spelled welch) is of unknown etymology but is often described as deriving from the adjective Welsh and consequently perceived as insulting to people from Wales.

=== Example in poetry ===
The poem "Job's Job" from Richard Lederer's The Word Circus is an example of the use of capitonyms:

In August, an august patriarch
Was reading an ad in Reading, Mass.
Long-suffering Job secured a job
To polish piles of Polish brass.

== Other languages ==
In other languages there are more, or fewer, of these pairs depending on that language's capitalization rules. For example, in German, where all nouns are capitalized, there are many pairs such as Laut 'sound' ~ laut 'loud' or Morgen 'morning' ~ morgen 'tomorrow'. In contrast, in Italian, as well as Spanish, very few words (except proper names) are capitalized, so there are extremely few, if any, such pairs. An example in Spanish is Lima (city) ~ lima 'file (tool)' or 'lime (fruit)'. In Portuguese, an example is Peru (country) ~ peru 'turkey' (bird).
