= Choronym =

Toponyms (place names) for regions or countries

Choronym (from Greek: χώρα 'region' or 'country' and Greek: ὄνομα 'name') is a linguistic term that designates a proper name of an individual region or a country. The study of regional and country names is known as choronymy, or choronymics. Since choronyms are a subclass of toponyms, choronymic studies represent a distinctive subfield of toponymic studies and belong to the wider field of onomastic studies.

Choronymic studies are primarily focused on questions related to the origin (etymology) and meanings (semantics) of choronyms. Since names of regions and countries have great historical, cultural, political and social significance, the field of choronymic studies is closely related to sociolinguistic and ethnolinguistic studies.

The term choronym was introduced to linguistic terminology in the second half of the 20th century.

== Typology ==
Choronyms can be classified by several criteria, primarily related to their origin (etymology) or meaning (semantics).

According to their origin (etymology), choronyms are divided in two basic groups:

- Endonymic choronyms, known as endochoronyms, represent regional or country names of endonymic (native) origin, created and used by native populations of those territories. For example, term Deutschland is an endochoronym (native name) for a country that is called Germany in English.
- Exonymic choronyms, known as exochoronyms, represent regional or country names of exonymic (foreign) origin that are created and used by those who do not belong to the native population of a referred territory. For example, the term Germany is an exochoronym (foreign name) used in English as a designation for a country that is called Deutschland by its native population.

According to their meanings (semantics), choronyms can also be divided into:

- Natural, or geographical choronyms: proper names of natural (geographical) regions, spanning from names of local geographical areas, to regional names of global significance (Scandinavia, Amazon, Sahel, Siberia, Africa)
- Political, or administrative choronyms: proper names of political (administrative) regions (counties, provinces, states, state unions).

== See also ==
- List of country-name etymologies
- List of country names in their native languages
- List of ISO 3166 country codes

== Sources ==
- Dorion, Henri (1975). "New Perspectives in Choronymic Research". Canoma: News and Views on Canadian Toponymy. 1 (1): 4–12.
- Dorion, Henri; Hamelin, Louis-Edmond (1966). "De la toponymie traditionnelle à une choronymie totale" (PDF). Cahiers de géographie du Québec. 10 (20): 195–211. doi:10.7202/020624ar.
- Dorion, Henri; Hamelin, Louis-Edmond (1976). "From the Traditional Toponymy to a Comprehensive Choronymy". Canoma: News and Views on Canadian Toponymy. 2 (1): 6–13.
- Harvalík, Milan; Caffarelli, Enzo, eds. (2007). "Onomastic Terminology: An International Survey" (PDF). Rivista Italiana di Onomastica. 13 (1): 181–220.
- Jeník, Jan (2002). "Choronyms in the Bavarian-Bohemian-Upper Austrian Borderland: Contribution towards their Standardization" (PDF). Silva Gabreta. 8: 5–18.
- Kapfhammer, Günther (1989). "Choronym - die zukünftige wissenschaftliche Bezeichnung für Landschaftsname?". Blätter für oberdeutsche Namenforschung. 26: 32–34.
- Kozlovskaya, Valeriya, ed. (2017). The Northern Black Sea in Antiquity: Networks, Connectivity, and Cultural Interactions. Cambridge, UK: Cambridge University Press. ISBN 978-1-107-01951-5.
- Munteanu, Eugen (2009). "Das Choronymische Mikrosystem des Rumänischen: Eine Historische Darstellung". Names in Multi Lingual, Multi Cultural and Multi Ethnic Contact. Proceedings of the 23rd International Congress of Onomastic Sciences. Toronto: York University. pp. 740–750.
- Room, Adrian (1996). An Alphabetical Guide to the Language of Name Studies. Lanham and London: The Scarecrow Press. ISBN 978-0-8108-3169-8.
