= Anthroponymy =

Study of the names of human beings

Anthroponymy (also anthroponymics or anthroponomastics, from Ancient Greek ἄνθρωπος anthrōpos, 'human', and ὄνομα onoma, 'name') is the study of anthroponyms, the proper names of human beings, both individual and collective. Anthroponymy is a branch of onomastics.

Researchers in the field of anthroponymy are called anthroponymists. Since the study of anthroponyms is relevant for several other disciplines within social sciences and humanities, experts from those disciplines engage in anthroponymic studies, including researchers from the fields of anthropology, history, human geography, sociology, prosopography, and genealogy.

Anthroponymists follow certain principles, rules and criteria when researching anthroponyms. The methods used for research are divided into two major categories: the collecting of anthroponymic information and the analysis and interpretation of anthroponyms. The collection of anthroponymic information includes: inscriptions, documents, onomastics-tax records, dictionaries, phone books, monographs, and websites, which are used afterward for mapping purposes. The analysis and interpretation of anthroponyms take into account the processing of the collection of the information gathered, which consists of linguistic analysis, comparative-historical method, geographical method, and statistical method.

== Anthroponymy of individual and family names ==
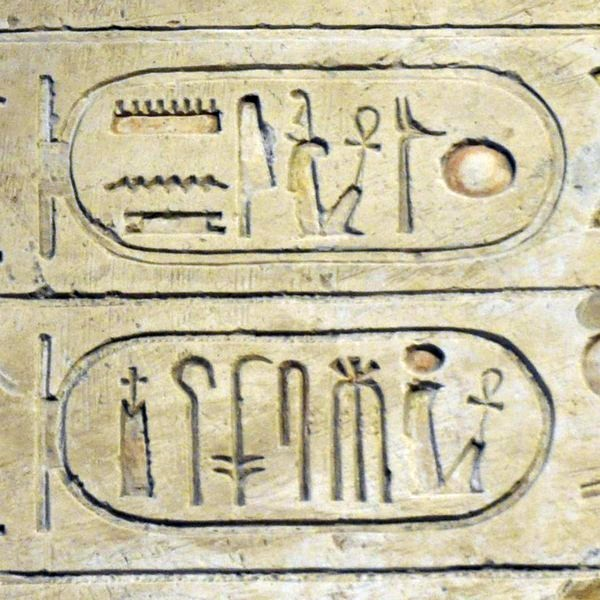
Name of pharaoh Ramesses III, written in hieroglyphs

Anthroponymy of individual and family names, and their mutual correlations, includes the study of:

- Personal names
- Given names
- Surnames
- Nicknames
- Pseudonyms
- Mononyms
- Matronyms
- Patronyms
- Eponyms
- Teknonyms

Anthroponyms of individuals can also be classified according to gender. Names of human males are called andronyms (from Ancient Greek ἀνήρ / man, and ὄνομα / name), while names of human females are called gynonyms (from Ancient Greek γυνή / woman, and ὄνομα / name).

== Anthroponymy of group and population names ==
Anthroponymy of group and population names includes the study of demonyms (names of localized populations), ethnonyms (names of ethnic groups), as well as tribal names and clan names.

== Anthroponymy and culture ==
Anthroponymy is a socio-cultural tool that can be used to find out about an individual's culture. Through the name of a person, their nationality, as well as their history, can be traced. Anthroponyms have both a national and cultural significance as they guarantee the preservation of linguistics, cultural, and historical information.

== Related terms and processes ==
There are several specific terms and processes related to anthroponymy, like:

- anthroponymization, a process when an anthroponym is formed from an apellative, like when a surname is created from the name of ones occupation, thus forming an occupational surname. Such surnames are common in most languages, including English: Smith (from smith), Miller (from miller), Thatcher (from thatcher), Shepherd (from shepherd), or Potter (from potter).
- deanthroponymization, a process when an anthroponym becomes an apellative, like when the surname of the inventor Louis Braille was used to create a name for the writing system for visually impaired persons (braille).
- transonymization of anthroponyms into toponyms, a process when a human proper name is used to form a toponym (proper name of a locality; place name), thus creating an anthropotoponym, like when the name of Alexander the Great was used to create several astionyms (city names), including for the newly created city of Alexandria in ancient Hellenistic Egypt, or when the surname of Christopher Columbus was used to create several choronyms (region names), including names for the South American country of Colombia, and the Canadian province of British Columbia.
- transonymization of toponyms into anthroponyms, a process when toponyms (place names) are used to form human names (anthroponyms), thus creating various topoanthroponyms. Many surnames are created in this way, and they are known as toponymic surnames. Most demonyms (names for localized populations) are topoanthroponyms by formation, since they are usually created from toponyms, and also some ethnonyms are topoanthroponyms too (those that are formed from toponyms, and thus referred to as topoethnonyms). For example, geographic designations for the region of Black Mountain (Montenegro) and frontier region of Ukraina (Ukraine) were used to create not only demonyms for general populations for those regions, but also ethnonyms for modern ethnic Montenegrins and ethnic Ukrainians.

== See also ==
- Birth name
- Middle name
- Legal name
- Double surname
- Toponymic surname
- Ancient Greek personal names
- Bilingual tautological anthroponyms
- Endonym and exonym
- Nominative determinism
- Posthumous name
- Necronym
- Suffix onym

== Sources ==
- Barolini, Teodolinda, ed. (2005). Medieval Constructions in Gender And Identity: Essays in Honor of Joan M. Ferrante. Tempe: Arizona Center for Medieval and Renaissance Studies. ISBN 9780866983372.
- Bourin, Monique; Martínez Sopena, Pascual, eds. (2010). Anthroponymie et migrations dans la chrétienté médiévale [Anthroponymy and Migrations in Medieval Christianity]. Madrid: Casa de Velázquez. ISBN 9788496820333.
- Bruck, Gabriele vom; Bodenhorn, Barbara, eds. (2009) [2006]. An Anthropology of Names and Naming (2nd ed.). Cambridge: Cambridge University Press.
- Danver, Steven L., ed. (2015). Native Peoples of the World: An Encyclopedia of Groups, Cultures and Contemporary Issues. London and New York: Routledge. ISBN 9781317464006.
- Fossier, Robert (2010). The Axe and the Oath: Ordinary Life in the Middle Ages. Princeton, NJ: Princeton University Press. ISBN 9781400836147.
- Fraser, Peter M. (2000). "Ethnics as Personal Names". Greek Personal Names: Their Value as Evidence (PDF). Oxford: Oxford University Press. pp. 149–157. Archived from the original (PDF) on 2019-10-18.
- Reis, Levilson C. (2013). "The medieval forms and meanings of Francois: The political and cultural vicissitudes of an ethnonym". French Studies Bulletin. 34 (3): 58–61. doi:10.1093/frebul/ktt019.
- Roberts, Michael (2017). "The Semantics of Demonyms in English". The Semantics of Nouns. Oxford: Oxford University Press. pp. 205–220. ISBN 978-0-19-873672-1.
- Room, Adrian (1996). An Alphabetical Guide to the Language of Name Studies. Lanham and London: The Scarecrow Press. ISBN 9780810831698.
- Ziolkowska, Magdalena (2011). "Anthroponomy as an Element Identifying National Minority". Eesti ja Soome-Ugri Keeleteaduse Ajakiri. Journal of Estonian and Finno-Ugric Linguistics. 2 (1): 383–398. doi:10.12697/jeful.2011.2.1.25.
