= Eliot Slater =

British psychiatrist (1904–1983)

Eliot Trevor Oakeshott Slater (28 August 1904 – 15 May 1983) was a British psychiatrist who was a pioneer in the field of the genetics of mental disorders. He held senior posts at the National Hospital for Nervous Diseases, Queen Square, London, and the Institute of Psychiatry at the Maudsley Hospital. He was the author of some 150 scientific papers and the co-author of several books on psychiatric topics, notably on disputed 'physical methods'. From the mid-50s to his death, he co-edited Clinical Psychiatry, the leading textbook for psychiatric trainees.

== Early life and medical education ==
Eliot Slater was born in Plumstead, London, on 28 August 1904. His father was Gilbert Slater, an economic historian who became Professor of Indian Economics at the University of Madras and later principal of Ruskin College, Oxford. His mother, Violet Oakeshott, a Quaker and pacifist, was instrumental in sending him to Leighton Park School, Reading, from where he won an exhibition to St John's College, Cambridge, to study natural sciences, in which he gained a third class degree. He went on to St George's Hospital, London, and qualified as a doctor in 1928. In 1931 he was appointed medical officer at the Maudsley Hospital, London, where he was encouraged by his chiefs Aubrey Lewis and Edward Mapother to apply statistical methods to the empirical study of mental illness.

== Germany 1934-5 and 1937/39; the Second World War ==
In 1934 Slater was awarded a Rockefeller Foundation travelling fellowship, which he used to study psychiatric genetics under Bruno Schulz at the Forschungsanstalt für Psychiatrie (Psychiatric Research Institute) in Munich (which he would visit again in 1937). He also made visits to other psychiatric institutes in Germany and in Denmark, Sweden and Austria. By this time Nazi persecution of Jewish professionals was well under way, and on Mapother's initiative the Rockefeller Foundation started providing funds enabling the Maudsley to receive prominent psychiatrists expelled from their posts in Germany. Among them was Willi Mayer-Gross, with whom Slater subsequently collaborated both in research and in the writing of a celebrated textbook.

Slater would later describe Schulz as a man of utmost scientific integrity and an uncompromising opponent of the Nazi regime; in fact Schulz supported its early racial hygiene measures and forced sterilization, publishing in 1934 in a journal edited by senior Nazis such as Heinrich Himmler. The director of the Munich Institute and head of its genetics department was Ernst Rudin, the predominant architect and rationaliser of Hitler's eugenic sterilization policies and implicated in Action T4.

Meanwhile, at the Munich institute, Slater met his future wife Lydia Pasternak, a chemist and daughter of the Russian artist Leonid Pasternak and sister of the poet Boris Pasternak. He returned to his post at the Maudsley Hospital, accompanied by Lydia Pasternak. As he wrote, "It was a source of peculiar satisfaction to me to be showing what I thought of Nazi Rassenhygiene by marrying a Jewess, a member of an inferior race by their standards, a lady of the highest genetical aristocracy by mine." Her elderly parents followed from Berlin, and soon her cousin brought his family (being her sister and their two children) to England.

Slater would later refer to the Nazis as 'unspeakable men' and 'devils' with a 'detestable ideology', and noted the Nazification of the Munich institute when he left in 1935, claiming to have never seen much of Rudin and to only recall once interacting socially with him at a ceremonial dinner at his home. However, in a lecture delivered in 1936, two thirds of Slater's references were to members of the Munich institute. In an article published in 1936 he surveyed the German forced sterilization practices but did not disagree in principle; in fact he suggested they would undoubtedly succeed to some degree but questioned the technical implementation and whether force was the most efficient strategy. While the article caused some professional irritation to Rudin, it did not stop Slater gaining Rudin's support for publishing two lengthy articles in German journals, and contributing to an academic celebration in Munich in 1939 for Rudin's 65th birthday, publishing an article in German in the festschrift in his honour.

With the outbreak of war in 1939 the Maudsley was evacuated, and Slater became clinical director of the Sutton Emergency Hospital, where he had responsibility for the treatment of some 20,000 psychiatric casualties. This experience led to the influential book An Introduction to Physical Methods of Treatment in Psychiatry (with William Sargant, 1944).

== Post-war years ==
Eliot Slater's first marriage was dissolved in 1946 and he married Jean Fyfe Foster in the same year. In an article published in a eugenics journal in 1947, Slater tentatively suggested that group differences between Jews and Christians might disappear (along, therefore, with antisemitism) due to inter-breeding.

Also in 1946, he was appointed Physician in psychological medicine at the National Hospital for Nervous Diseases, Queen Square, London, where he worked for eighteen years. He resigned in 1964 in protest at the hospital's rejection of the offer of a benefaction from the Mental Health Research Fund to establish a chair in psychiatry, writing in his resignation letter that the collective views of his colleagues had "…turned increasingly counter to everything for which I have stood", and that they had failed to appreciate the need for academic research in psychiatry.

In 1949 he was appointed a member of the Royal Commission on Capital Punishment (1949–1953). He was strongly opposed to capital punishment, not only as a barbarity, but also because statistical studies indicated that it was ineffective. He was delighted when capital punishment was finally abolished in 1969.

Meanwhile, he continued his own research as senior lecturer at the Institute of Psychiatry, notably on the prevalence of psychiatric disorders in twins (with James Shields). In 1959 he helped establish the Medical Research Council Psychiatric Genetics Unit at the Maudsley Medical School/Institute of Psychiatry, which he directed until 1969. His work here culminated in The Genetics of Mental Disorders (with Valerie Cowie, 1971).

Slater was known for advocating from 1958 a 'monogenic' theory of schizophrenia, by which it was alleged to be caused by a single (partially dominant) gene.

Among his numerous other publications, one to be singled out is Clinical Psychiatry (with Willi Mayer-Gross and Martin Roth, 1954), which became a standard textbook for doctors and students, and remained so for many years (third edition 1969 by Slater and Roth; revised 1977). He gave the Litchfield (1959), Galton (1960) and Mapother (1960) lectures. In his Maudsley (1961) lecture and later writings he questioned the concept of 'hysteria' as a valid diagnosis, showing that serious physical illness subsequently emerged in many patients initially labelled 'hysterical' and arguing that the physical illness could often account for their allegedly psychological symptoms; in this respect he disputed the Washington University in St. Louis school, primarily Samuel Guze.

He was editor of the British Journal of Psychiatry from 1961 to 1972, and transformed it into a leading European journal. In 1966 he was appointed CBE. He held honorary fellowships of several British, German and American medical and psychiatric societies. He was vice chair of the Eugenics Society from 1963 to 1966, having been a Fellow from 1957 to 1977. He received an honorary degree from the University of Dundee in 1971.

Slater, along with his close associate William Sargant, was an "evangelical" proponent of the crude brain surgery known as the lobotomy, even into the 1970s. They long advocated for a range of other 'physical' treatments, including insulin coma therapy, even well after clinical trials cast doubt on its efficacy.

It has been noted that originally (1944) they wrote that their judgements of efficacy – in the absence of any known theoretical basis for it – were on purely empirical (research) grounds, but later (e.g. 1963) they justified them as the insights of the careful and attentive observer. They repeatedly emphasised benefits over psychotherapy in terms of speed and 'convenience' in dealing with large numbers of mental patients, and in 'certainty' of improvements; however the claims of curative or transformative powers proved hollow, and they were sometimes used to make patients easier to manage.

Slater died at his home in Barnes, London, on 15 May 1983, being survived by his first and second wives and by the four children of his first marriage – a mathematician, a haematologist, a psychiatrist and an English don.

King's College London, under whose umbrella the Institute of Psychiatry now operates, has continued to memorialise his psychiatric work by holding an annual 'Eliot Slater prize in psychiatry' since 1983.

== Outside interests ==
He had wide interests outside his work. They included chess (he published a statistical investigation of chess openings), music (studying and publishing on the pathography of Schumann and other composers), poetry (he published a book of his own, often rather dark, poems, The Ebbless Sea), euthanasia (he joined the Euthanasia Society after his retirement), painting (an exhibition of his paintings was held in 1977), and the statistical study of literature (he was awarded a PhD from London University at the age of 77 for a statistical word study of the play Edward III, which provided evidence that the play was by Shakespeare). In an essay of 1969 (now in ETOS; see below), he also applied his professional expertise to the authorship question with particular reference to the Sonnets. He found the psychological difficulties raised by the orthodox view of William Shakespeare of Stratford-upon-Avon's authorship "most insuperable" but resolutely stuck to a principle of open-mindedness without pitching for any other candidate.

== Bibliography (books only) ==
- An Introduction to Physical Methods of Treatment in Psychiatry (with William Sargant) (Edinburgh: Livingstone, 1944; 2nd ed. 1948; 3rd ed. 1954; 4th ed. 1963)
- Patterns of Marriage: a study of marriage relationships in the urban working classes (London: Cassell, 1951)
- Psychotic and Neurotic Illnesses in Twins (London: HMSO, 1953)
- Clinical Psychiatry (with W. Mayer-Gross and M. Roth) (London: Baillière, Tyndall and Cassell 1954; 2nd ed. 1960; 3rd ed. 1969; reissued 1970, 1972, 1974 and 1977)
- Delinquency in Girls (with J. Cowie and V. Cowie) (London: Heinemann, 1968)
- The Ebbless Sea: Poems (1922–1962), (Walton on Thames: Outposts, 1968)
- Man, Mind and Heredity: selected papers of Eliot Slater on psychiatry and genetics (ed. J. Shields and I. I. Gottesman) (Baltimore and London: Johns Hopkins Press, 1971)
- The Genetics of Mental Disorders (with V. Cowie) (Oxford: Oxford University Press, 1971)
- Psychiatry, Genetics and Pathography: a tribute to Eliot Slater (ed. M Roth and V Cowie) (London: Gaskell Press, 1979).
- The problem of 'The Reign of King Edward III', a statistical approach (Cambridge: Cambridge University Press, 1988)
