= William Sargant =

British psychiatrist (1907–1988)

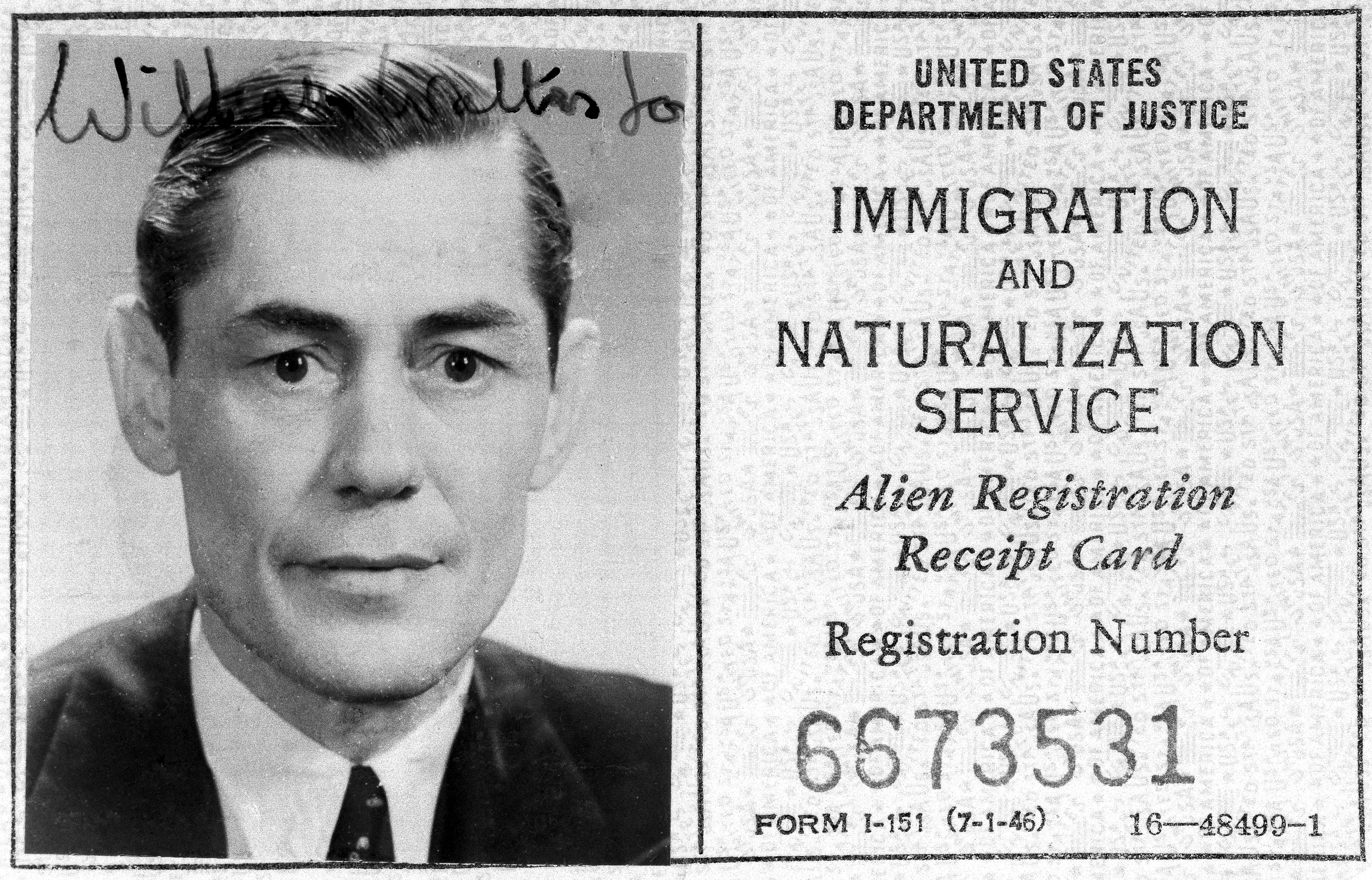
- 1947 US ID card of Sargant
- Born: 24 April 1907; Highgate, London, England
- Died: 27 August 1988 (aged 81)
- Education: Leys School; St John's College, Cambridge; St Mary's Hospital, London
- Occupation: Doctor
- Medical career
- Institutions: Maudsley Hospital (1935–1938); Sutton Emergency Hospital (c. 1939–1945); St. Thomas' Hospital (1948–1972); Harley Street (private practice)
- Sub-specialties: Psychiatrist

William Walters Sargant (24 April 1907 – 27 August 1988) was a British psychiatrist who is remembered for the zeal with which he promoted treatments such as psychosurgery, deep sleep treatment, electroconvulsive therapy and insulin shock therapy.

Sargant studied medicine at St John's College, Cambridge, and qualified as a doctor at St Mary's Hospital, London. His ambition to be a physician was thwarted by a nervous breakdown, after which he turned his attention to psychiatry. Having trained under Edward Mapother at the Maudsley Hospital, in South London, he worked at the Sutton Emergency Medical Service during the Second World War.

In 1948 he was appointed director of the department of psychological medicine at St Thomas' Hospital, London, and remained there until (and after) his retirement in 1972, whilst also treating patients at other hospitals, building up a lucrative private practice in Harley Street, and working as a media psychiatrist.

Sargant co-authored a textbook on physical treatment in psychiatry that ran to five editions. He wrote numerous articles in the medical and lay press, an autobiography, The Unquiet Mind, and a book titled Battle for the Mind in which he discusses the nature of the process by which our minds are subject to influence by others. Although remembered as a major force in British psychiatry in the post-war years, his enthusiasm for discredited treatments such as insulin shock therapy and deep sleep treatment, his distaste for all forms of psychotherapy, and his reliance on dogma rather than clinical evidence have confirmed his reputation as a controversial figure whose work is seldom cited in modern psychiatric texts.

== Early life and medical career ==
Sargant was born into a large and wealthy Methodist family in Highgate, London. His father was a City broker, his mother, Alice Walters, was the daughter of a Methodist minister from a family of wealthy Welsh brewers. Five of his uncles were preachers. He had two brothers—human rights campaigner Thomas Sargant and Bishop of Mysore, Norman C. Sargant, and five sisters. Sargant went to the Leys School in Cambridge and then studied medicine at St John's College, Cambridge. He did not excel academically but played rugby for St John's College, was president of Cambridge University Medical Society and collected autographs of famous medical men. Sargant obtained a rugby scholarship to complete his medical education at St Mary's Hospital. His father lost most of his money in the depression in the late 1920s and the scholarship allowed Sargant to continue his medical education. After qualifying as a doctor he worked as a house-surgeon and house-physician at St Mary's and looked set for a successful career as a physician. But in 1934—four years after qualifying as a doctor—a nervous breakdown and spell in a mental hospital cancelled his plans. Sargant would later attribute this period of depression to undiagnosed tuberculosis, although research which he conducted on the use of iron, in very high doses, for the treatment of pernicious anaemia was not well received and this disappointment may have contributed to his breakdown.

After his recovery, Sargant worked as a locum at Hanwell Hospital, and then for a while helped his brother-in-law at his Nottingham general practice, before deciding on a career in psychiatry. In 1935 he was offered a post by Edward Mapother at the Maudsley Hospital. In his autobiography Sargant describes how Mapother's views coincided with his own: 'the future of psychiatric treatment lay in the discovery of simple physiological treatments which could be as widely applied as in general medicine'. Soon after he arrived at the Maudsley, Sargant was involved in testing amphetamine as a new treatment for depression and took it himself while studying for the diploma in psychological medicine. Sargant would take a variety of drugs to treat his depression throughout his life. Another treatment introduced at the Maudsley while Sargant was there was insulin shock therapy.

In 1938 Sargant was awarded a Rockefeller Fellowship to spend a year at Harvard Medical School in Boston, Massachusetts, under Professor Stanley Cobb. Whilst there he did some experiments on over-breathing and developed a theory that the difference between normal and neurotic people is that the latter have lost their suggestibility. On a visit to Washington he arranged to meet Walter Freeman and see three of his patients who had undergone psychosurgical operations. Although the results were not altogether successful, Sargant resolved to introduce the operation into Britain.

== Second World War ==
At the outbreak of war in September 1939 Sargant returned to Britain to find that the Maudsley had been evacuated and divided into two—one half going to Mill Hill School in North London and the other half setting up a hospital in the old Belmont Workhouse near Sutton, Surrey. Sargant was sent, along with H.J. Shorvon, clinical director Eliot Slater, and medical superintendent Louis Minski to Belmont workhouse—renamed the Sutton Emergency Medical Service (in 1953 the name of the hospital would revert to Belmont). The hospital, which took both civilian and military patients, was jointly controlled by the Ministry of Health and London County Council. Sargant described his frustration when London County Council medical advisors tried to curb his experimentation with new treatments such as electroconvulsive therapy and psychosurgery (also called leucotomy) but, as he said "we generally got our own way in the end". They were, for example, only allowed to carry out individual psychosurgical operations with the approval of the Council advisors. When the doctors advised against operation, Sargant got round this by sending patients to be operated on by Wylie McKissock at St George's Hospital, (where Eliot Slater was temporarily in charge of the psychiatric department). It was, he said, "doing good by stealth". But critics saw him as someone of extreme views who was cruel and irresponsible and refused to listen to advice; some suggested that he was motivated by repressed anger rather than a desire to help people.

Sargant selected neurotic patients, especially those with obsessional ruminations, for operation, which carried with it a significant risk of death, personality deterioration, epileptic seizures, and incontinence. After the Dunkirk evacuation the Sutton Emergency Medical Service received large numbers of military psychiatric casualties and Sargant developed abreaction techniques – patients would relive traumatic experiences under the influence of barbiturates. He also used modified insulin treatment, electroconvulsive treatment and sedation in the treatment of military patients. During the war Sargant wrote, together with Eliot Slater, a textbook, An introduction to physical methods of treatment in psychiatry; five editions were published, and it was translated into several languages. In 1940 he married Peggy Glen, who he had met at the Laboratory at Belmont, where Peggy worked as a volunteer. The couple had no children.

== St Thomas' Hospital ==
After the war, Sargant found it difficult to settle at the re-united Maudsley Hospital and applied – unsuccessfully – for positions elsewhere. In 1947 he was invited to spend a year as a visiting professor of psychiatry at Duke University. He returned to Britain in August 1948 having been offered the position of head of the department of psychological medicine at St Thomas’, a teaching hospital in London. At that time the new department consisted of a basement with no in-patient beds, and no requirement on students to attend lectures on psychiatry. Sargant was to stay at St Thomas's for the rest of his career, and he built the department up into an "active treatment, teaching and research unit". The basement was refurbished to use as an out-patient department (for electroconvulsive therapy, modified insulin treatment, methedrine injections, etc.), while the amalgamation of St Thomas’ and nearby Royal Waterloo Hospital provided Sargant with a 22-bed ward for his in-patients (this was to become his ward for continuous narcosis or deep sleep treatment). Sargant's work at St Thomas' was funded by the NHS with support from the endowment funds of St Thomas' Hospital and gifts from private individuals.

Both at Belmont Hospital and at St Thomas', Sargant subjected patients to up to three months' combined electroconvulsive therapy, continuous narcosis, insulin coma therapy and drugs. He said in a talk delivered in Leeds: "For several years past we have been treating severe resistant depression with long periods of sleep treatment. We can now keep patients asleep or very drowsy for up to 3 months if necessary. During sleep treatment we also give them ECT and anti-depressant drugs". Sargant used narcosis (sleep treatment) to overcome a patient's refusal of electroconvulsive therapy, or even deliver it without their knowledge. He wrote in his standard textbook An introduction to physical methods of treatment in psychiatry: "Many patients unable to tolerate a long course of ECT, can do so when anxiety is relieved by narcosis ... What is so valuable is that they generally have no memory about the actual length of the treatment or the numbers of ECT used ... After 3 or 4 treatments they may ask for ECT to be discontinued because of an increasing dread of further treatments. Combining sleep with ECT avoids this ...". Sargant also advocated increasing the frequency of ECT sessions for those he describes as "resistant, obsessional patients" in order to produce "therapeutic confusion" and so remove their power of refusal. In addition he states: "All sorts of treatment can be given while the patient is kept sleeping, including a variety of drugs and ECT [which] together generally induce considerable memory loss for the period under narcosis. As a rule the patient does not know how long he has been asleep, or what treatment, even including ECT, he has been given. Under sleep ... one can now give many kinds of physical treatment, necessary, but often not easily tolerated. We may be seeing here a new exciting beginning in psychiatry and the possibility of a treatment era such as followed the introduction of anaesthesia in surgery".

Sargant's methods inspired Australian doctor Harry Bailey who employed deep sleep treatment at Sydney's Chelmsford Private Hospital, eventually leading to the death of 26 patients. Bailey and Sargant were in close contact and apparently competed to see which of them could keep a patient in the deepest coma. The death rate among Sargant's patients was lower than that among Bailey's, largely thanks to the nursing skills of the 'Nightingales' (St Thomas' nurses). Each sleeping patient was allocated a nurse or student nurse who would monitor their sleep every 15 minutes and wake them every six hours to feed and wash them and take them to the toilet. Some of the nurses disliked working in the narcosis ward, but a former ward sister defended the treatment, recalling patients as 'being pleased to be helped'. There were, however, several deaths.

It was Sargant's firm belief that anyone with psychological problems should be treated early and intensively with all available methods – combined if necessary. He referred to himself as "a physician in psychological medicine". The available methods, which Sargant also referred to as "modern" and "active" treatments, were drugs in large doses (antidepressants, amphetamines, barbiturates, tranquillisers, neuroleptics), electroconvulsive therapy, insulin coma therapy, continuous narcosis and leucotomy. Failures in treatment were put down to the patient's lack of a "good previous personality". (Sargant was fond of saying that you can't make a silk purse out of a pig's ear.) Such failures were sent from St Thomas' to the wards of mental hospitals.

The part-time nature of Sargant's NHS contract at St Thomas' allowed him time to treat patients at other hospitals and establish a private practice on Harley Street (when he died he was worth over £750,000). He also wrote articles for the medical and popular press, appeared in TV programmes, and published an autobiography, The Unquiet Mind, in 1967. He was president of the section of psychiatry at the Royal Society of Medicine in 1956–57, and was a founding member of the World Psychiatric Association. In 1973 he was awarded the Starkey Medal and prize by the Royal Society of Health for work on mental health.

A second bout of tuberculosis and depression in 1954 gave Sargant time to complete his book Battle for the Mind (and also an opportunity for giving up his 30-year heavy smoking habit). He spent his convalescence in Mallorca, and Robert Graves helped him edit the book. Battle for the Mind, published in 1957, was one of the first books on the psychology of brainwashing. While this book is often referred to as a work on 'brainwashing', and indeed it is subtitled a physiology of conversion and brainwashing, Sargant emphasises that his aim is to elucidate the processes involved rather than advocate uses. In the book he refers extensively to religious phenomena and in particular Christian Methodism, emphasising the apparent need for those who would change people's minds to first excite them, as did the founder of Methodism, John Wesley.

Sargant connected Ivan Pavlov's findings to the ways people learned and internalised belief systems. Conditioned behaviour patterns could be changed by stimulated stresses beyond a dog's capacity for response, in essence causing a breakdown. This could also be caused by intense signals, longer than normal waiting periods, rotating positive and negative signals and changing a dog's physical condition, as through illness. Depending on the dog's initial personality, this could possibly cause a new belief system to be held tenaciously. Sargant also connected Pavlov's findings to the mechanisms of brain-washing in religion and politics.

Some of Sargant's former colleagues remember him with admiration. David Owen worked under Sargant at St Thomas' in the 1960s, before embarking on his political career, and recalled him as "a dominating personality with the therapeutic courage of a lion" and as "the sort of person of whom legends are made". But others, who preferred to remain anonymous, described him as "autocratic, a danger, a disaster" and spoke about "the damage he did".

Patients, too, recall their treatment at the hands of Sargant in very different terms. One man who consulted Sargant at his Harley Street private practice for depression in the 1960s later recalled "Will" with affection and respect. Visiting Sargant for a brief consultation every six months, he was given large doses of drugs and had a course of electroconvulsive therapy; he remembered his relief at being told that his depression was caused by chemical and hereditary factors and could not be resisted by an effort of personal will. But a woman who had been admitted to St Thomas' in 1970 with post-natal depression, and was left with memory loss after treatment with narcosis and electroconvulsive therapy, recalled her experience with anger.

British actress Celia Imrie was admitted to St Thomas' Hospital when she was fourteen for the treatment of anorexia under the care of Sargant. She was given insulin. Imrie has written that her eventual cure was nothing to do with Sargant and his bizarre techniques.

== BBC Radio documentary ==
On 1 April 2009, BBC Radio 4 broadcast a programme researched and introduced by James Maw entitled Revealing the Mind Bender General dealing with Sargant's activities and concentrating on his Sleep Room treatments at St Thomas's Hospital. Although Sargant was a consultant at St Thomas’ his sleep room was at the nearby Royal Waterloo Hospital which at that time was part of the St Thomas’ group of hospitals. Among the interviewees were his one-time registrar David Owen, and a number of patients from St Thomas' as well as a survivor of the Porton Down human experimentation, who testified that their lives had been shattered by Sargant's treatments. Among the points that were brought out were the routine violation of patients' rights as regards giving consent for treatment and the fact that Sargant admitted in correspondence with an Australian lawyer that patients had died under his deep sleep regime. Prolonged artificial sleep carried risks such as deep vein thrombosis, pressure sores, infections, and gut paralysis, which could be fatal, and at least five of Sargant’s patients died during narcosis therapy.

== MKULTRA ==
In recent years writer Gordon Thomas has suggested that Sargant's experiments with deep sleep treatment were part of British involvement with the CIA MKULTRA programme into mind control. Donald Ewen Cameron was experimenting along similar lines in Canada, and it later emerged that his work was in part funded by the CIA. Cameron often sought Sargant's advice and on one occasion Sargant sent Cameron a note saying: "Whatever you manage in this field, I thought of it first". Books about Cameron's experiments have commented on links between the two psychiatrists. Although Sargant acted as a consultant for MI5, no evidence has emerged that his work with deep sleep treatment at St Thomas' hospital had any links with intelligence services.

== Quotes ==
"What would have happened if they [new methods of physical and chemical psychiatric treatments] had been available for the last five hundred years?... John Wesley who had years of depressive torment before accepting the idea of salvation by faith rather than good works, might have avoided this, and simply gone back to help his father as curate of Epworth following treatment. Wilberforce, too, might have gone back to being a man about town, and avoided his long fight to abolish slavery and his addiction to laudanum. Loyola and St Francis might also have continued with their military careers. Perhaps, even earlier, Jesus Christ might simply have returned to his carpentry following the use of modern [psychiatric] treatments."

"Though men are not dogs, they should humbly try to remember how much they resemble dogs in their brain functions, and not boast themselves as demigods. They are gifted with religious and social apprehensions, and they are gifted with the power of reason; but all these faculties are physiologically entailed to the brain. Therefore, the brain should not be abused by having forced upon it any religious or political mystique that stunts the reason, or any form of crude rationalism that stunts the religious sense." (p. 274)

== In popular culture ==
British author Jon Stock has written a non-fiction book titled The Sleep Room based on Sargant's experiments. Stock researched this book by contacting survivors of Sargant's experiments and accessing Sargant's papers at the Wellcome Collection, as well as recently released documents at the National Archives in Kew. The book was published in the UK on 4 April 2025, and was scheduled to be published in the US on 22 July 2025. In particular, the book contains the recollections of actress Celia Imrie, who was hospitalised under Sargant's care with severe anorexia and subjected to large doses of chlorpromazine, insulin injections and electroconvulsive therapy.

== Works ==
=== Books ===
- An Introduction to Physical Methods of Treatment in Psychiatry, with Eliot Slater. Edinburgh: E & S Livingstone (1944).
  - 2nd ed. (1948); 3rd ed. (1954); 4th ed. (1963); 5th ed. (1972). ISBN 044300868X.
  - U.S. ed. (1944): An Introduction to Somatic Methods of Treatment in Psychiatry. Baltimore: Williams and Wilkins.
- Battle for the Mind: A Physiology of Conversion and Brainwashing. London: Heinemann; New York: Doubleday (1957); Cambridge, MA: Malor Books (1997). ISBN 1883536065.
- The Unquiet Mind: The Autobiography of a Physician in Psychological Medicine. London: Heinemann (1967).
- The Mind Possessed: A Physiology of Possession, Mysticism, and faith Healing. London: Heinemann (1973).

=== Articles ===
- "A Battle for Our Minds." Sunday Times (Jul. 3, 1960).
- "Psychiatric Treatment: Here and in England." The Atlantic (Jul. 1964), pp. 88–95.
- "Psychiatry and War." The Atlantic (May 1967), pp. 102–109.
- "Should Patients be 'Tortured' in the Name of Progress?" The Times [London], 1788 (1975), p. 10.
