= Mapother =

Mapother /ˈmeɪˌpɒθər/ is an Anglo-Irish surname, associated with County Roscommon in Ireland since the early 17th century. It probably originated as the Irish pronunciation of the English surname Mappowder, after Mappowder in Dorset.

Notable people with the surname include:

- Edward Mapother (1881–1940), Anglo-Irish psychiatrist
- Tom Cruise (born 1962), born Thomas Cruise Mapother IV, American actor and producer
- William Mapother (born 1965), American actor and cousin of Tom Cruise
