= Felix Post =

British psychiatrist (1913–2001)

Felix Post MRCS LRCP MRCP FRCP FRCPsych
- Born: 25 July 1913; Berlin, Germany
- Died: 23 March 2001 (aged 87); Oxford, England
- Monuments: Felix Post Unit, Maudsley Hospital
- Education: St Bartholomew's Hospital
- Occupations: Doctor, psychiatrist
- Employer: Maudsley Hospital
- Known for: Pioneering geriatric psychiatry
- Notable work: The clinical psychiatry of late life (1965)

Felix Post (25 July 1913 – 23 March 2001) was a German-born British doctor, and a leading psychiatrist of the second half of the 20th century. Post was a pioneer of psychogeriatrics and the first chair of the psychogeriatricians in the Royal College of Psychiatrists.

== Life ==
Felix Post was born in Berlin on 25 July 1913. His mother was Jewish, and he arrived in England in 1934 as a refugee from Nazi Europe. There, he completed his medical studies at St Bartholomew's Hospital, qualifying as a doctor in 1939.

Post worked at Hammersmith Hospital (alongside Sir Aubrey Lewis) and at Whipps Cross, taking up psychiatry at the Mill Hill Emergency Hospital (part of Maudsley Hospital during the war). He was interned for a short time as an "enemy alien" on the Isle of Man. In 1942, Post took up a psychiatric role in Edinburgh, working under Professor Sir David Henderson. There, he was encouraged to focus on the elderly people on the wards, leading him to a career emphasis on geriatric psychiatry. Following the war, he was called up to the Royal Army Medical Corps, ending up as a major.

In 1947, Post joined the staff of the joint Bethlem-Maudsley Hospital, where he established a pioneering psychiatric unit for people over 60. He remained at the Hospital until retirement in 1978. His biography for the Royal College of Physicians describes Post as "possibly the best teacher among the large and talented staff" of the Maudsley.

In addition to his practical work, Post was a researcher and writer on geriatric psychiatry, publishing a number of papers, chapters, and monographs. The Significance of Affective Symptoms in Old Age, published in 1962, was a follow-up study of 100 patients admitted to Bethlem with a depressive illness. His 1965 textbook The clinical psychiatry of late life became a standard text. In 1972 his article "The management and nature of depressive illness in late life" was published in the British Journal of Psychiatry, this and his 1962 work being "of cardinal importance for research in old age depression".

Post was the first chairman of the psychogeriatricians in the Royal College of Psychiatrists (later the faculty of psychiatry of old age), and a foundation fellow of the College. Between 1969–1970, he was president of the psychiatry section at the Royal Society of Medicine. Post was awarded the 50th anniversary medal of the British Geriatrics Society "in recognition of outstanding services to geriatric medicine", and was honoured in 1995 by the International Psychogeriatric Association.

== Death and legacy ==
Felix Post died suddenly in March 2001, survived by his second wife, Kathleen, and two children from his first marriage.

The Felix Post Unit at Maudsley Hospital commemorates him. He has been described as "probably the first dedicated old age psychiatrist anywhere in the world". Tom Arie, for the Royal College of Physicians, wrote:

He inspired a generation of pupils in many countries who, stimulated by his clinical teaching and research, built special services for old people.

An oral history interview with Felix Post is held by the Imperial War Museum.

== Selected bibliography ==
- The significance of affective symptoms in old age (London, Oxford University Press, 1962)
- The clinical psychiatry of late life (Oxford, Pergamon Press, 1965)
- Persistent persecutory states of the elderly (Oxford/New York, Pergamon Press,1966)
