= Maud Hospital =

Hospital in Aberdeenshire, Scotland

- NHS Grampian
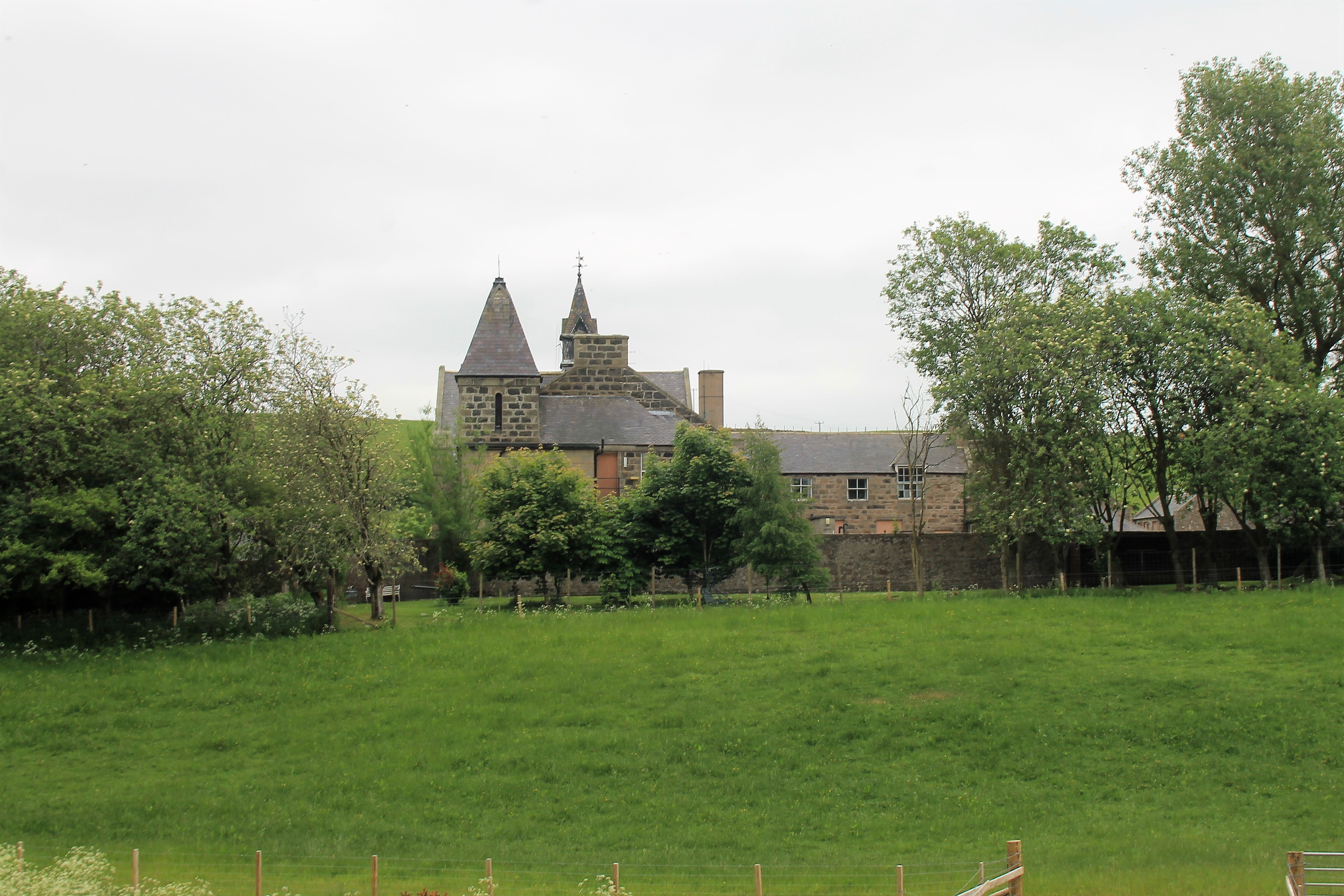
- Maud Hospital

- Shown in Aberdeenshire

Geography
- Location: Maud, Aberdeenshire, Scotland, United Kingdom
- Coordinates: 57°31′7″N 2°7′32″W

Organisation
- Care system: NHS Scotland
- Type: Psychogeriatric

Services
- Emergency department: No Accident & Emergency

History
- Founded: 1867
- Closed: October 2008

Links
- Lists: Hospitals in Scotland

Maud Hospital was a small hospital providing psychogeriatric services in Maud, Aberdeenshire. It was managed by NHS Grampian.

== History ==
The hospital was designed by Alexander Ellis and opened as the Buchan Combination Poorhouse and Maud Home in 1867. It joined the National Health Service in 1948 but after the introduction of Care in the Community in the early 1980s, it went into a period of decline and, following a consultation by Aberdeenshire Community Health Partnership in 2005, it closed in October 2008.
