= Tom Arie =

British old age psychiatrist (1933–2020)

Tom Arie CBE, FRCPsych, FRCP, FFPH
- Born: 9 August 1933; Prague, Czechoslovakia
- Died: 24 May 2020 (aged 86); Norfolk, England
- Education: Reading School; Balliol College, Oxford; Maudsley Hospital; London Hospital
- Occupation: Geriatric Psychiatrist
- Spouse: Eleanor Arie
- Children: 3

Thomas Harry David Arie (9 August 1933 – 24 May 2020) was a British old age psychiatrist, described as "one of the founding fathers of old age psychiatry."

== Career ==
Arie qualified in Oxford then underwent further training in psychiatry at the Maudsley Hospital and in social medicine at the MRC Social Medicine Unit at the London Hospital.

He set up a psychiatric unit for old people at Goodmayes Hospital in 1969. In a 1996 interview, he recalled:

A job was advertised at a place I had never heard of, Goodmayes Hospital, to set up a psychiatric service for old people. I thought, this is really back to what I'm after, going to an un-posh place in the outer East End of London, seeing if one could make a service for old people tick. So that's what I did. Most people thought I had taken leave of my senses. I started work on January 1, 1969. Up the road at Claybury Hospital there was Brice Pitt, who was about two years ahead of me in setting up an old age service – I think his work had given the idea to the Goodmayes people. The people at Goodmayes had been puzzled – who could this chap be who had opted to come out of the teaching hospital to look after old people whom nobody wanted? It somewhat rocked my confidence, everybody being so negative about it.

He was Foundation Professor of Health Care of the Elderly at the University of Nottingham until 1995, becoming emeritus on retirement.

He served as chair of the Old Age Faculty of the Royal College of Psychiatrists, and as chair of the Geriatric Psychiatry Section of the World Psychiatric Association.

He was made a Commander of the Order of the British Empire (CBE) in the 1995 Birthday Honours, for "Services to Medicine".
