= Valerie Cowie =

British consultant psychiatrist (1924–2023)

- Born: 1924; Wanstead, Essex, England
- Died: 7 July 2023 (aged 99)
- Spouse: John Cowie (m. 1947, divorced)
- Children: 3 sons

Academic background
- Education: University of Aberdeen

Academic work
- Discipline: Psychiatry
- Institutions: Maudsley Hospital, London; Bethlem Royal Hospital, London; National Institutes of Health, United States; Ely Hospital, Cardiff; Priory Hospital, Roehampton

Valerie Cowie (1924 – 7 July 2023) was a British consultant psychiatrist, who trained as a registrar in hospitals in London after studying medicine in Aberdeen. She subsequently worked as a researcher at the Medical Research Council Psychiatric Genetics Research Unit and studied for a PhD about the development of babies with Down syndrome. She went on to hold academic posts in the United States and in Wales, published a number of books, including with Eliot Slater, and appeared as an expert witness in several court cases.

== Biography ==
Valerie Cowie was born in 1924 in Wanstead, Essex, but raised in Harpenden, Hertfordshire. She studied medicine at the University of Aberdeen, where she researched dietary treatments for phenylketonuria, being awarded her MD in 1951. Cowie trained as a psychiatry and neurology registrar at the Maudsley Hospital and the Bethlem Royal Hospital in London, and then took up a research position at the Maudsley, where she worked for 11 years at the Medical Research Council Psychiatric Genetics Research Unit, including as its deputy director. She was awarded a PhD for research into the development of babies with Down syndrome at Guy's Hospital. She also worked as an associate professor at the National Institutes of Health in the United States, and established an academic unit for psychiatric genetics at Ely Hospital, Cardiff. She was once described by a colleague as "one of the stars of modern psychiatry". When she was appointed a senior lecturer at the University of Wales in 1982, one of her referees for the job noted that "My only reservation is that the post of senior lecturer does not adequately do justice to her high academic status", arguing that a personal chair would have been more appropriate.

In 1947, she married John Cowie, a fellow psychiatrist. The couple met at Aberdeen Royal Infirmary. The University of Aberdeen's principal and vice-chancellor, William Hamilton Fyfe, wrote of Cowie: "It's fine to find someone going on with medicine and research in spite of a husband". Valerie and John Cowie had three sons together, one of whom died after three days. They were divorced in the 1960s and she had two further, short marriages. After her retirement from the National Health Service, she continued to work as a consultant at the Priory Hospital, Roehampton, into her late seventies, and she saw four or five patients in her home up until the age of 96. Her licence to practice was eventually revoked by the General Medical Council when, being housebound, she could not undertake the required continuing professional development. She died aged 99 on 7 July 2023.

== Expert witness ==
On occasion, Cowie appeared as an expert witness. During a case in 1978, she advised a judge that because children often grow concerned with their biological origins as they age, children of divorced parents should retain the surname of their father. According to an obituary, this "became one of the leading cases in family law textbooks". In 2011, she gave evidence in the trial of Paul White, Baron Hanningfield for parliamentary expenses fraud, telling the judge that Hanningfield "is clinically depressed. When the verdict passed he completely crumpled. He has been in a state of denial and confusion. He has become unwell and has had several falls". He had reportedly told her, "the only thing I can do is to plunge a knife into my dog and then into myself".

== Publications ==
Elizabeth Comack notes that in Delinquency in Girls (1968), Cowie, together with John Cowie and Eliot Slater, "looked for 'constitutional predisposing factors' to explain female delinquency", characterising delinquent girls as "oversized, lumpish, uncouth and graceless". Christine E. Rasche writes that in her 1973 literature review, "The Etiology of Female Crime", Dorie Klein noted that along with their contemporaries, Cowie et al. "were apt to view women as offending or inadequate no matter what they did". Klein writes that, according to Cowie et al., "if they are violent, they are 'masculine' and suffering from chromosomal deficiencies, penis envy, or atavisms. If they conform, they are manipulative, sexually maladjusted and promiscuous". Cowie's other publications included Study of the Early Development of Mongols (1970), The Genetics of Mental Disorders, with Eliot Slater (1971), and Psychiatry, Genetics, and Pathography: A Tribute to Eliot Slater, with Martin Roth (1979).
