= Alec David Young =

British scientist (1913–2005)

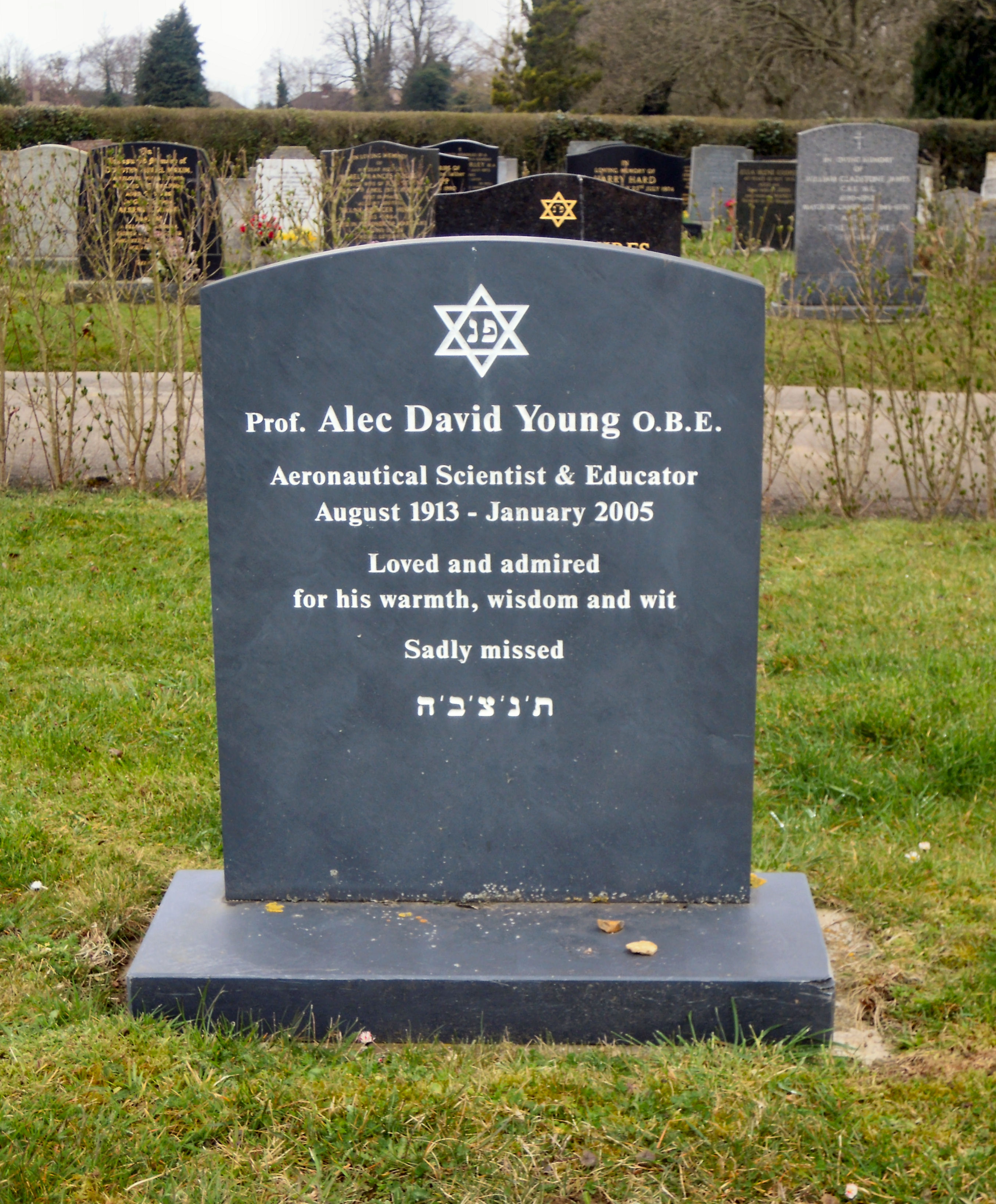
The grave of Alec David Young in Cambridge City Cemetery

Alec David Young (15 August 1913 – 27 January 2005) was a British aeronautical engineer.

Alec Young was the son of refugees from Russia who raised him in Stepney, London. He attended Central Foundation Boys' School for his secondary education. He first noticed his future wife Dora Caplan when they were both studying at a public library.

In December 1931 he sat for examination at Cambridge University and was successful at winning an Exhibition to Gonville and Caius College. In order to achieve matriculation in one of the classical languages, a condition of entry at the time, he was obliged to make an intense study of Latin over a 6 month period and was duly awarded a School Certificate in the subject in June 1932.

Beyond his studies at Cambridge, Alec played tennis, swam, was cox of a rowing eight, and courted Dora. After graduation he continued study with Melvill Jones who had written "The Streamline Aeroplane" for the Royal Aeronautical Society in 1929. Their study aimed to reduce parasitic drag of an aircraft. Alec published his findings with the Aeronautical Research Council.

In 1936 he went to the Aerodynamics Department of the Royal Aircraft Establishment at Farnborough, Hampshire. There he became a member of the Civil Service and was able to marry his sweetheart Dora. They were to have two sons, Robert and Jonathan. Minimization of drag was his focus, even measuring drag of rivet heads, lap joints, gaps and paint. He was able to give corrective instructions for the Hampden bomber and some trainers.

In 1942 he began to work with wind tunnels and William Hawthorne in development of jet engines. The work sought to determine high-speed flow characteristics in inlets, curved and straight ducts, and diffusers. He also worked with Sydney Goldstein of the National Physical Laboratory to extend the Prandtl-Glauert transformation from two to three dimensions.

In July 1946 Alec became Senior Lecturer at the College of Aeronautics, Cranfield. One of Alec's collaborations there was with Abraham Robinson on 3D flows approaching the speed of sound. Another project attempted noise control of jet engines by modification of the efflux nozzle to improve mixing with external flow. He was awarded a patent and collected some royalties.

Daughter Judith arrived in 1949, and the following year Alec became Professor at Cranfield. In 1951 he was elected Fellow of the Royal Aeronautical Society. In 1954 he became Professor of Aeronautical Engineering, Queen Mary College, University of London. In 1962 he was elected Dean of the Faculty of Engineering. A bachelor's degree in avionics was pioneered in collaboration with Marconi Electronic Systems. In 1966 he became Vice-Principal at the College.

The Munich air disaster of 1958 resulted in the deaths of most of the Manchester United football team. Edgar Fay headed an investigation of the crash, and Young consulted. The study concluded that slush on the runway was the key factor, rather than the ice on the wings, that caused the failed takeoff. The pilot of the aircraft was vindicated and the airport authorities were seen to be at fault in giving the go-ahead for take-off.

Dora Young developed a brain tumor in 1968 and died in 1970. The following year daughter Judith married Herman Waldmann. His mother, a widow, then married Alec the widower. He formally retired in 1978 but continued to be very active academically with some collaborations on the research front, with consultancy both in the UK and abroad, guest lectures and the authorship of articles and several books.

He was awarded an OBE in 1964, and elected a Fellow of the Royal Society in 1973. He was awarded the Ludwig-Prandtl-Ring from the Deutsche Gesellschaft für Luft- und Raumfahrt (German Society for Aeronautics and Astronautics) for "outstanding contribution in the field of aerospace engineering" in 1976.

He is buried in the Jewish Section of Cambridge City Cemetery.

== Selected publications ==
- 1952: Principles of the Control and Stability of Aircraft, Cambridge University Press
- 1953: Chapter "Boundary layers" in Howarth: Modern developments in fluid dynamics: high speed flow, Clarendon Press
- 1960: (with W. J. Duncan & A. S. Thom) The Mechanics of Fluids, Edward Arnold
- 1970: (with M. Zamir) "Experimental investigation of the boundary layer in a streamwise corner", Aeronautical Quarterly 21: 313–39, Royal Aeronautical Society
- 1971: (with O. O. Mojola) "An experimental investigation of the turbulent boundary layer along a streamwise corner", AGARD CP 93.
- 1979: (with M. Zamir) "Pressure gradient and leading edge effects on the corner boundary layer", Aeronautical Quarterly 30; 471–84.
- 1984: The Aerodynamics of Controls, AGARD CP 384
- 1989: Boundary Layers, Blackwell Science
