= Hilary Stock =

British photographer (born 1964)

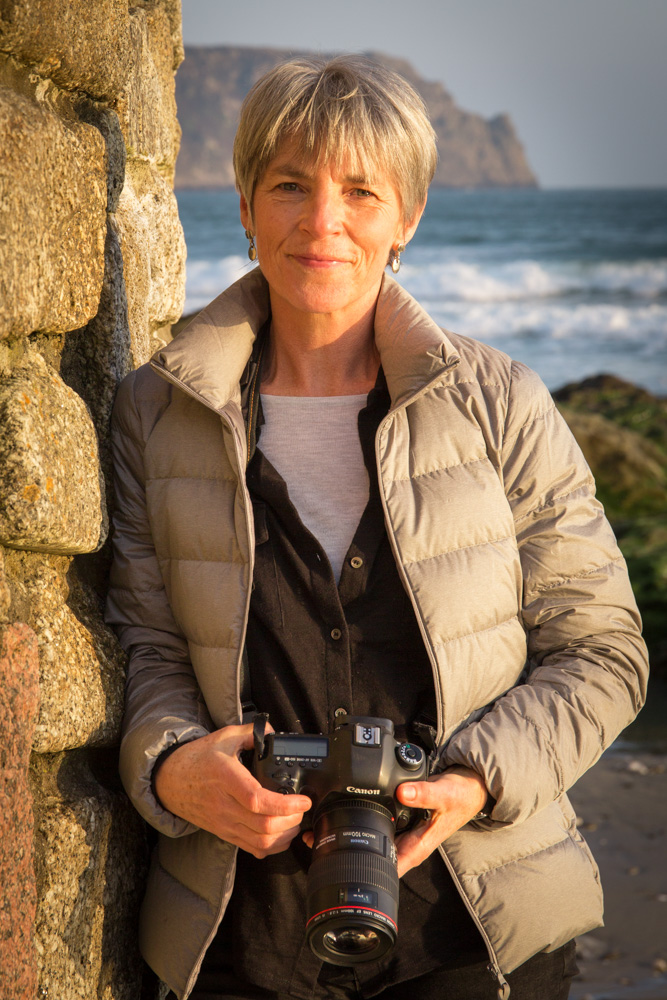
- Born: 8 November 1964 (age 61); England
- Occupation: Photographer
- Spouse: Jon Stock
- Children: 3

Hilary Stock (born 8 November 1964) is a British fine art photographer.

== Early life ==
Stock was educated at Bedales School, Hampshire and at University College London where she read anthropology. She is married to the author Jon Stock and lives in Wiltshire and they have three children. Before becoming a photographer, she was a documentary features producer for BBC Radio 4.

== Art exhibitions ==
Stock's work is exhibited at the Harbour Gallery in Portscatho, Cornwall and also at the Watergate Bay Hotel in Cornwall, where she held an exhibition in 2012 called "When the Boat Comes in". She has also exhibited at the White Horse Gallery in Marlborough, Wiltshire, where she held a solo show, ‘From Wiltshire Woods to the Cornish Coast’, in December 2018. In 2015, she took part in a local Wiltshire art trail, Marlborough Open Studios, in which she exhibited her Cornish work.

In a review of her 2018 solo show in Marlborough with Tower and Town, Gabriella Venus described Stock's collection as "glorious". She added:

"The mix of realism and storytelling is magical. There is always more to see on each viewing".

— Gabriella Venus, "Arts Review" page 11, Tower and Town December 2018

== Lifestyle and travel photography ==
Between 2013 and 2105, Stock's lifestyle photos of the annual WOMAD music festival in Wiltshire were featured on the Telegraph's online culture pages.

Stock's photos have been used to illustrate a number of travel features in The Telegraph, including trips to Chettinad, Ladakh, and Dublin. Her photos have also appeared in Condé Nast Traveller.

== The Gambia ==
In August 2018, Stock accompanied a group of British teenagers to Gunjur in The Gambia, where she helped to develop their confidence through photography. The trip was organised by the UK charity Thriving Through Venture. On her return, Stock organised a touring exhibition of the teenagers' work.
