= Norman Bleehen =

British professor (1930–2008)

Professor Norman Montague Bleehen CBE FRCR FRCP
- Born: 24 February 1930
- Died: 1 February 2008 (aged 77)
- Education: Manchester Grammar School; Haberdashers' Aske's Boys' School; Middlesex Hospital Medical School; University of Oxford (MA, BSc, MB, BCh)
- Spouse: Tirza Bleehen (née Loebe) (m. 14 December 1969)
- Parents: Soloman Bleehen (father); Leana Bleehen (née Shlosberg) (mother)

Norman Montague Bleehen CBE (24 February 1930 – 1 February 2008) was a British oncologist, radiologist and professor.

== Biography ==
=== Early life and education ===
Norman Bleehen was born on 24 February 1930 in Manchester to an Orthodox Jewish family. His father was Soloman Bleehen and his mother was Leana Bleehen (née Shlosberg). He grew up in London and was later educated at Manchester Grammar School and then Haberdashers' Aske's Boys' School (now Haberdashers' Boys' School).

Bleehen studied medicine at Exeter College, Oxford in 1947 and took an extra year to study for a Bachelor of Arts in Biochemistry. During his time at Oxford, he was also President of the Oxford University Jewish Society. He studied the aspects of insulin for which he was awarded the Gotch Memorial Prize. In 1952, he began clinical training at Middlesex Hospital School and qualified in 1955. In 1957, he was made a Member of the Royal College of Physicians.

=== National service ===
In 1957, Bleehen began his national service with the Royal Army Medical Corps. From 1958 to 1959, he worked at Spandau Prison in Allied-occupied Berlin. As Medical Officer there, he was responsible for the Nazi war criminals in the prison. However, as a Jew, he was concerned about taking medical responsibility for the inmates. He consulted his commanding officer about this and was told "This is the army, and that is your job".

=== Scientific career ===
After being demobilised in 1959, Bleehen rejoined Oxford University's department of Regius professor of medicine. He later specialised in radiotherapy at Middlesex Hospital. That same year, he became a Fellow of the Royal College of Radiologists. In 1962, he trained under Sir Brian Windeyer as senior registar at Middlesex Hospital. When Windeyer retired in 1969, Bleehen succeeded him as professor of radiotherapy.

In 1975, he moved to Cambridge as he was invited by the MRC (Medical Research Council) to set up a clinical and research unit at Addenbrooke's Hospital. He was elected the inaugural professor of the newly-created department of clinical oncology at the hospital. Under his direction, the department developed into one of the UK's top academic oncology research units.

Inside his department, he created a "Cancer Trials Office", which was successful and led to the MRC creating an independent Cancer Trials Unit.

From 1977 to 1980, he served as Chairman of the British Association of Cancer Research. In 1987, he became Vice President and was a founding member of the International Association for the Study of Lung Cancer. From 1985 till 1989, he served as President of the International Society of Radiation Oncology.

=== Later life ===
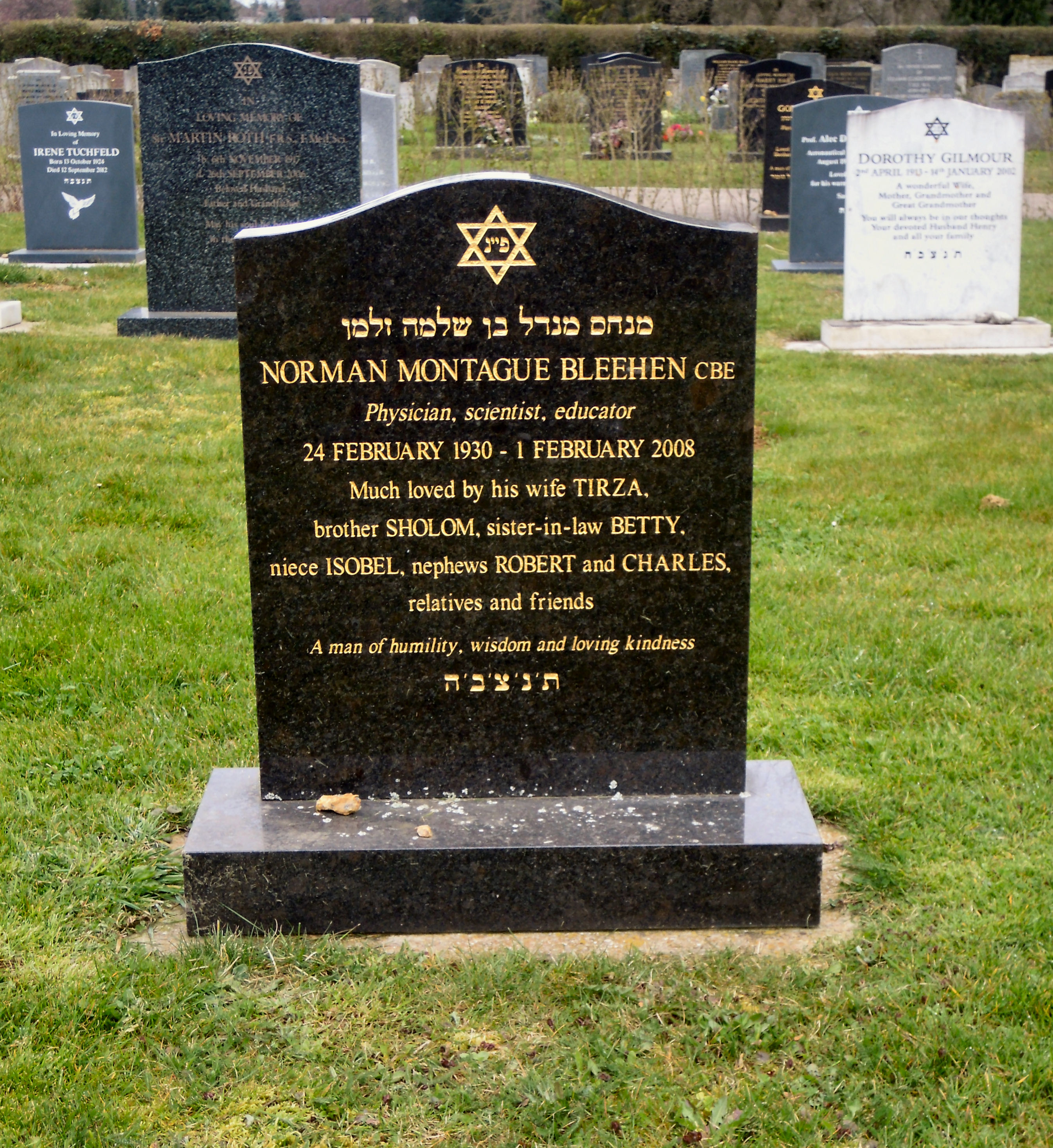
Bleehen's grave in Cambridge City Cemetery in 2015

Bleehen retired in 1995, and developed lung cancer in 2006. He died on 1 February 2008 and was buried in the Cambridge City Cemetery.

== Personal life ==
In the summer of 1969, he met Tirza Loebe, a PhD student, while he was doing his research at Middlesex Hospital, and they got married on 14 December 1969.

== Honours ==
- Gotch Memorial Prize
- Member of the Royal College of Physicians (1957)
- Fellow of the Royal College of Radiologists (FRCR; 1964)
- Fellow of the Royal College of Physicians (FRCP; 1970)
- Honorary Fellow of the American College of Radiologists (1973)
- Fellow of St John's College, Cambridge (1976)
- Emeritus Cancer Research Campaign Professor of Clinical Oncology (1976)
- Honorary Doctorate from the University of Bologna (1990)
- Commander of the British Empire (CBE; 1994)

== Bibliography ==
- Tumours of the Brain (1986)
- Radiology in Radiotherapy (1988)
