= Cambridge City Cemetery =

Cemetery in England

Coordinates: 52.213°N 0.169°E

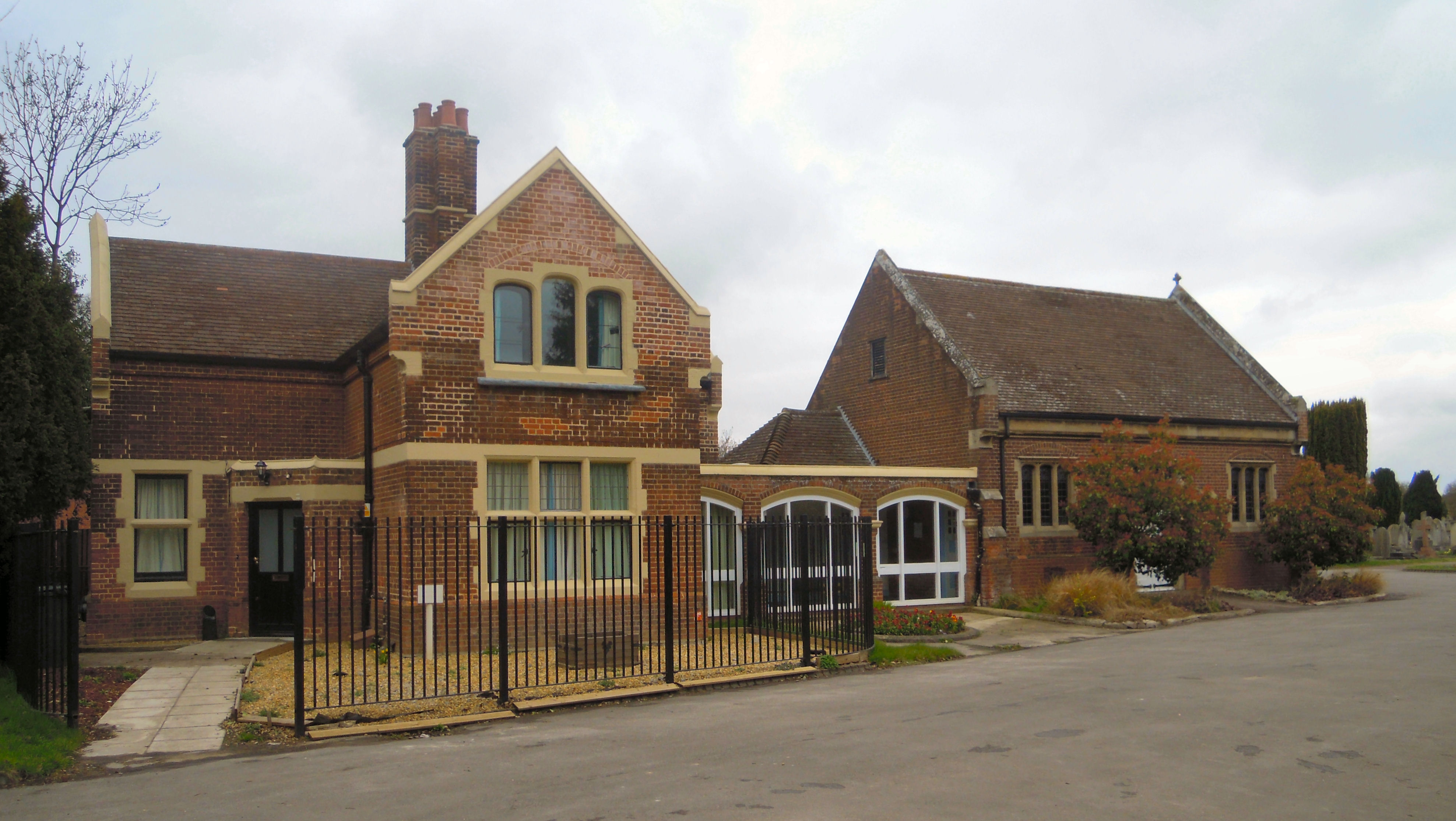
The Lodge and Chapel at Cambridge City Cemetery

Cambridge City Cemetery is the main burial ground for the city of Cambridge in Cambridgeshire. It is to the north of the city, at the junction of Newmarket Road and Ditton Lane, near to Cambridge Airport.

The cemetery held its first burial on 6 June 1903 when it was known as Cambridge Borough Cemetery. This was later changed to The Regional Cemetery before finally becoming The City Cemetery; it occupies eight hectares.

Known locally as Newmarket Road Cemetery, the cemetery has unlimited pedestrian access everyday including Sundays and bank holidays. The facilities include a car park and a memorial chapel.

In addition to the main burial ground, the cemetery also has a Jewish Section, a Muslim Section, a Roman Catholic section, a large Commonwealth War Graves Commission section and the Cantetebrigge Memorial Garden.

== Commonwealth War Graves Commission section ==
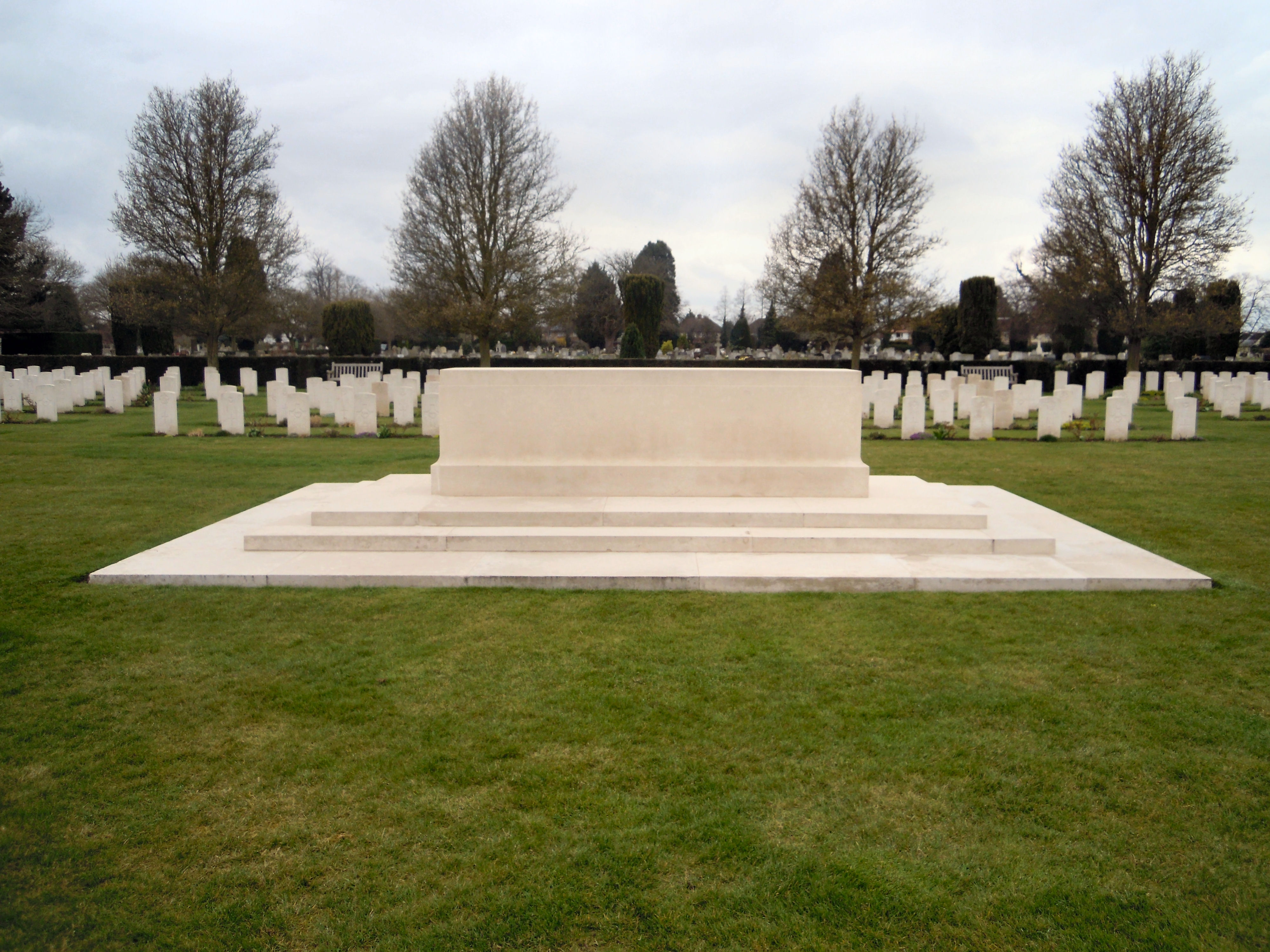
The Stone of Remembrance

The cemetery has a large Commonwealth War Graves Commission section; here are buried 1,008 servicemen and women from both World Wars, and is just one of six cemeteries in the United Kingdom with a large number of war graves. Over 180 of the graves date from World War I when the No.1 Eastern General Hospital was located in Cambridge. There are 829 service burials from World War II; three of the servicemen buried here are unknown. Also there are 10 war graves of other nationalities.

The World War II graves are mainly located in two War Graves Plots. The General Service plot was established in 1940, and the larger Air Force plot in 1942 for the burial of casualties from the Royal Air Force stations set up in the eastern counties during the war, which included Bomber Command bases in Lincolnshire and fighter bases in Norfolk and Suffolk.Nearby is a Cross of Sacrifice

The Stone of Remembrance, reserved for cemeteries with over 1,000 Commonwealth service burials, was unveiled in the Air Force plot by Marshal of the Royal Air Force Lord Tedder in July 1951.

== Notable burials ==
Notable burials at the cemetery include:

- Norman Bleehen, oncologist, radiologist and professor.
- Bertha Lewis, the principal contralto with the D'Oyly Carte Opera Company.
- Alec David Young, a British aero-engineer.
- Philip de Fonblanque, senior British officer who organised the logistics for the British Expeditionary Force in 1939–40.
- Martin Roth, a British psychiatrist.
- Alexis Charles Doxat, English recipient of the Victoria Cross.
- James John McLeod Innes, Scottish recipient of the Victoria Cross.
- Frederick Robertson, British flying ace of the Second World War.
- Barbara Yung, Hong Kong actress during the early 1980s (ashes).
- Sir German Sims Woodhead pathologist
- Choudhry Rahmat Ali, Pakistani nationalist who was one of the earliest proponents of the creation of the state of Pakistan. Famous for proposing the name Pakistan.

== Gallery ==
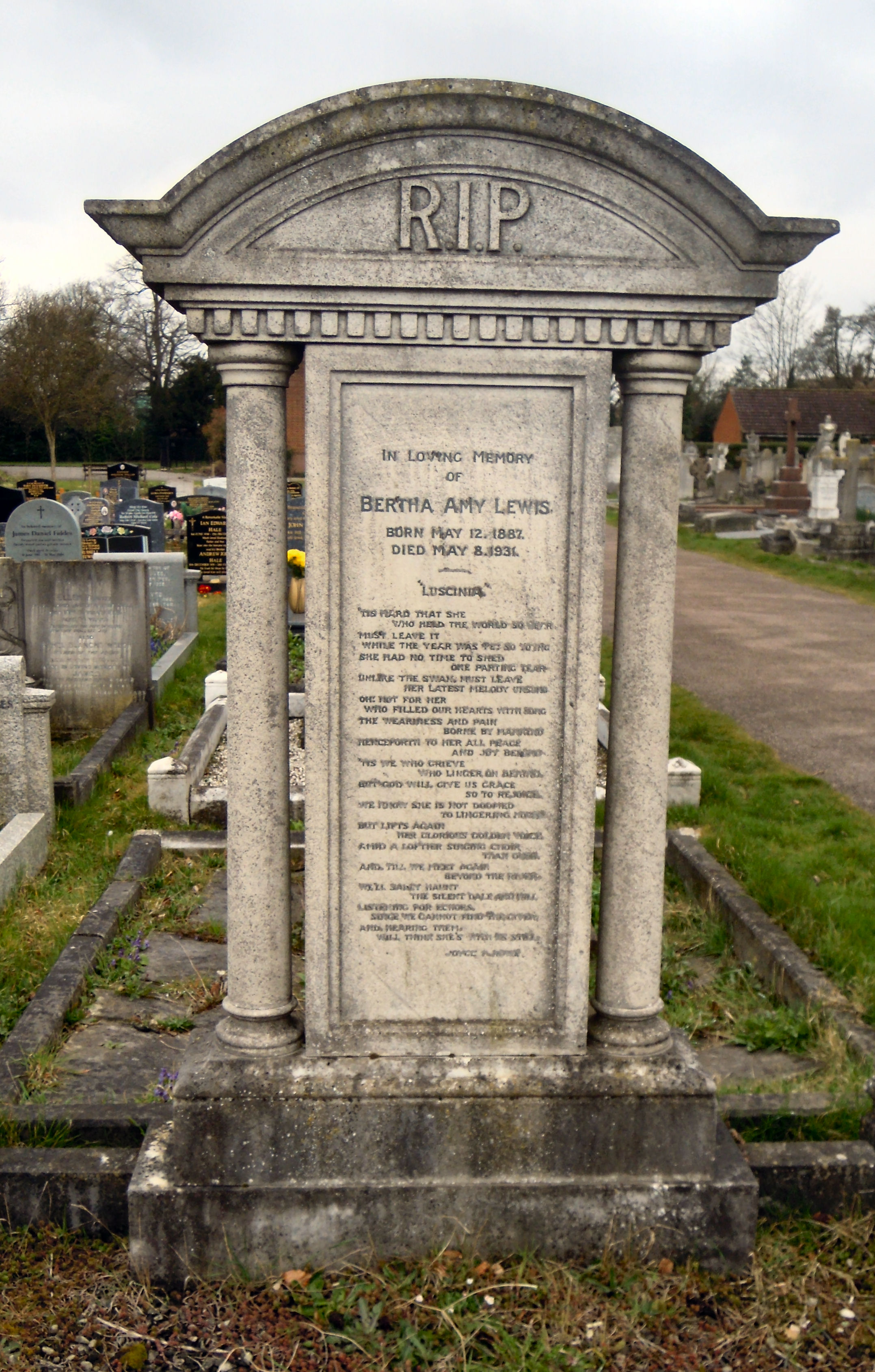
The grave of opera singer Bertha Lewis

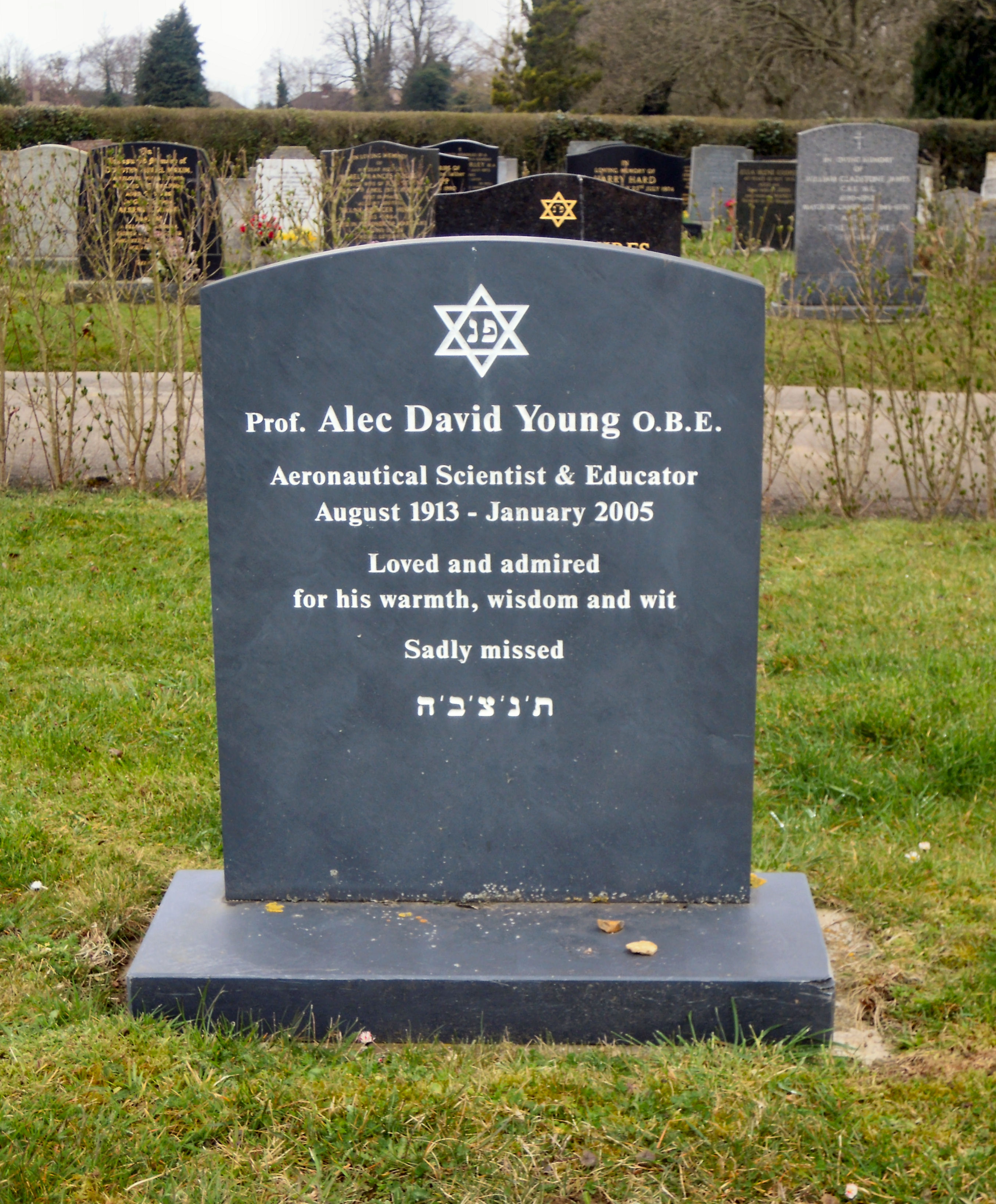
The grave of aero-engineer Alec David Young

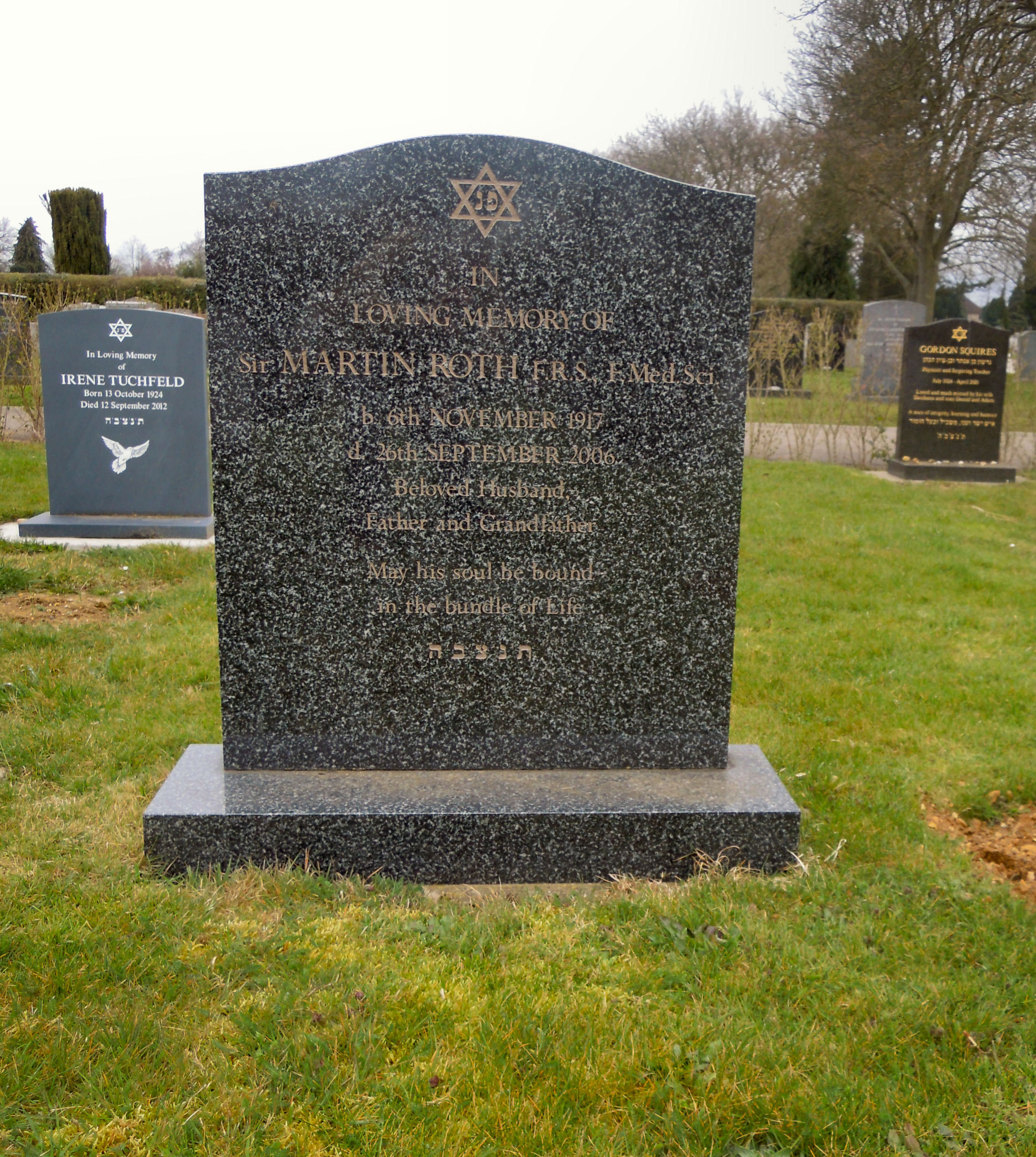
The grave of psychiatrist Sir Martin Roth

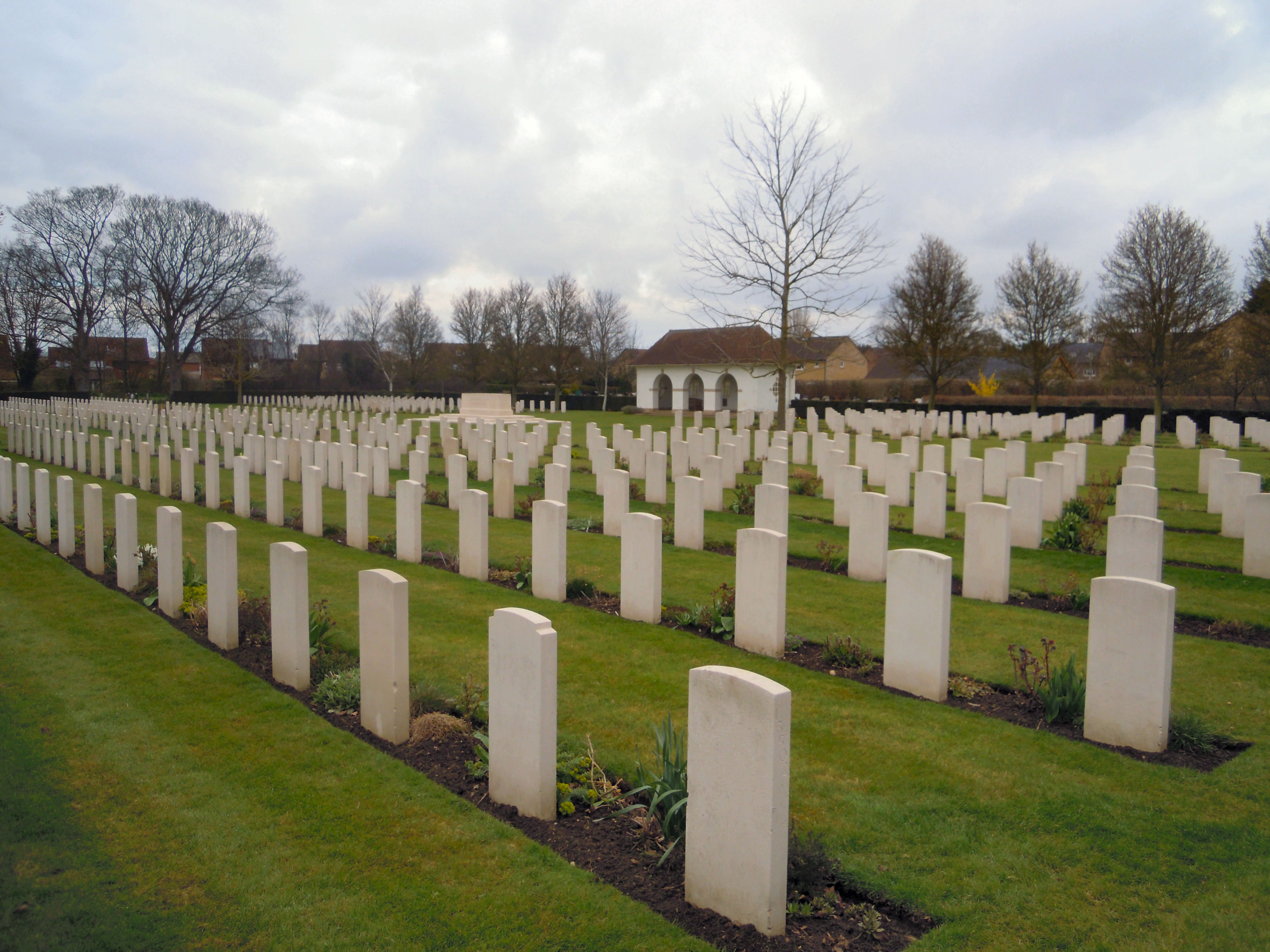
A section of the CWGC burials

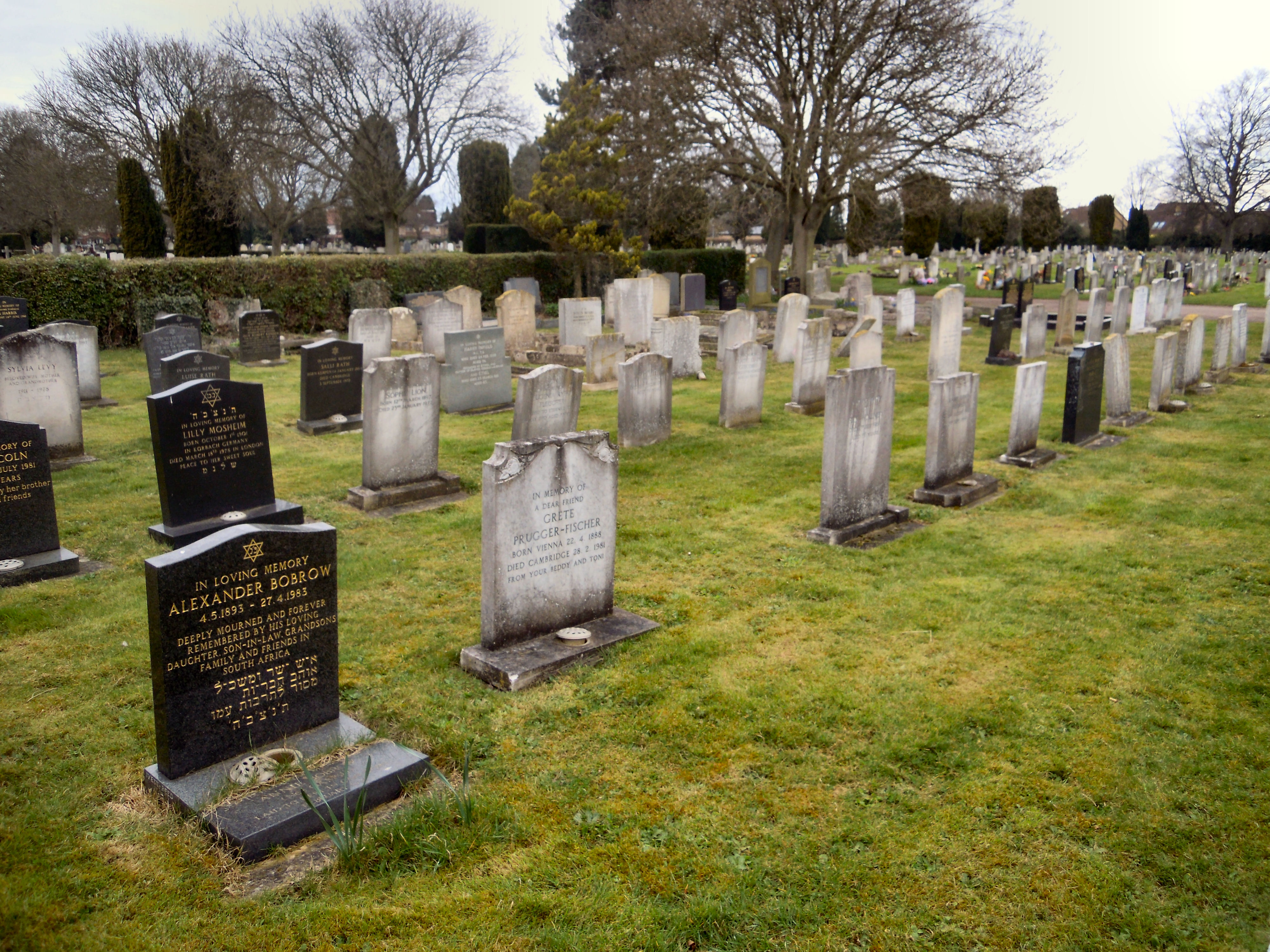
Part of the Jewish Section at the cemetery

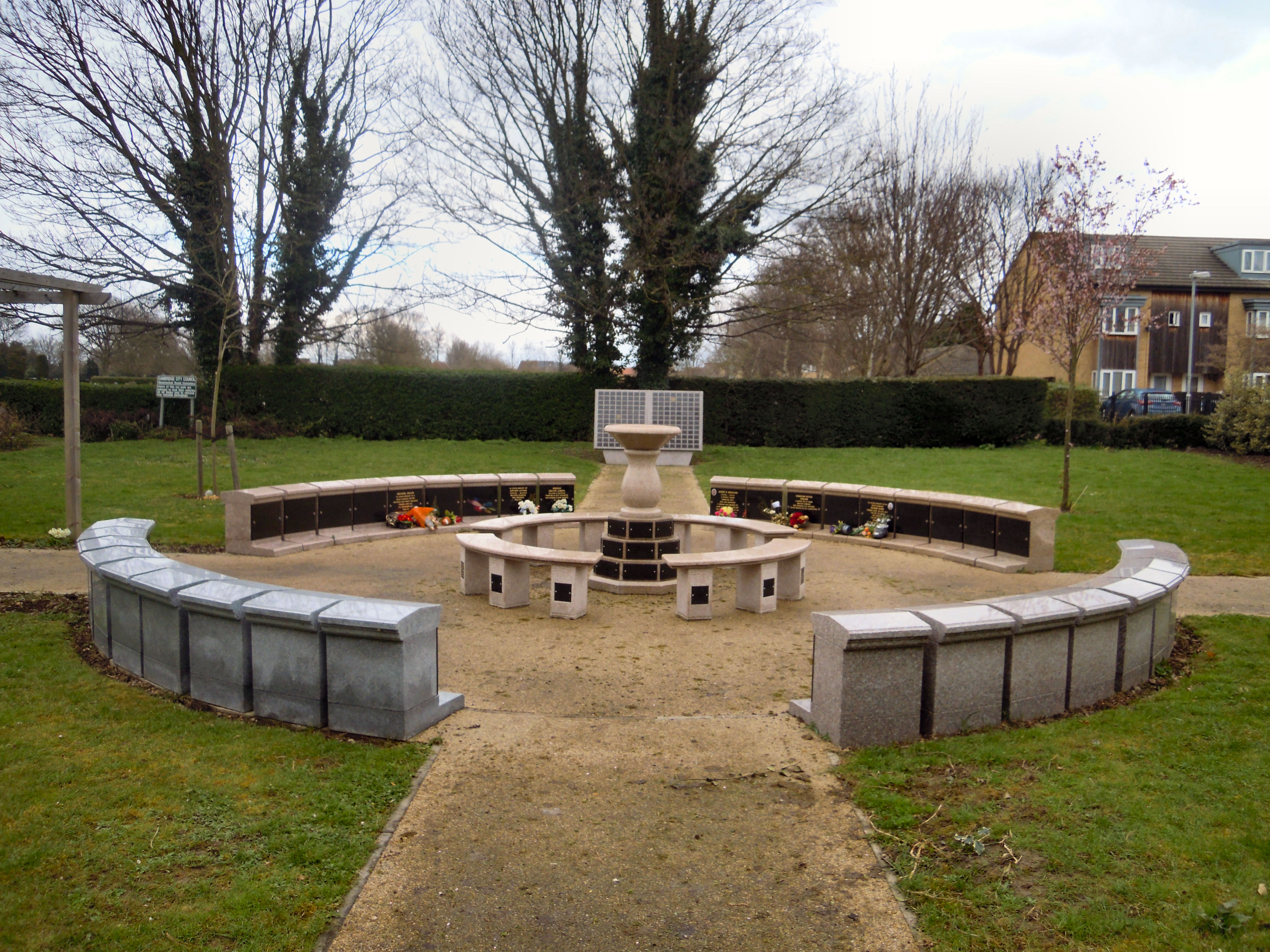
The Cantetebrigge Memorial Garden
