= Jon Stock =

British writer (born 1966)

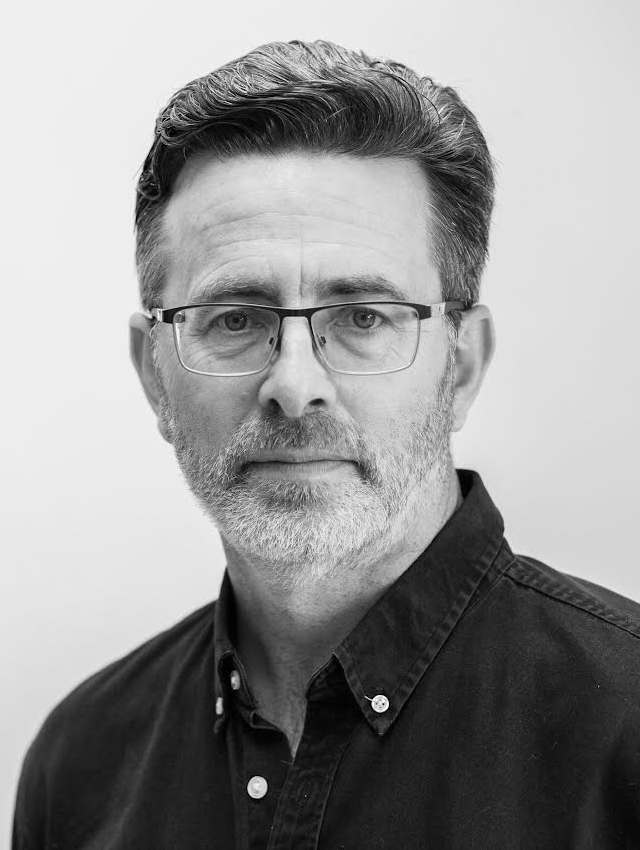
- Born: 12 May 1966 (age 60); England
- Occupations: Author, columnist
- Spouse: Hilary Stock
- Children: 3
- Writing career
- Pen name: J.S. Monroe
- Genre: Spy thriller

Jon Stock (born 12 May 1966 in England) is a British author and journalist. Between 1997 and 2017, he wrote six spy novels under his own name: The Riot Act (1997); The Cardomom Club (2003); Dead Spy Running (2009); Games Traitors Play (2011); Dirty Little Secret; To Snare a Spy. He has also written five psychological thrillers under the pen name J.S. Monroe: Find Me (2017); Forget My Name (2018); The Other You (2020); The Man on Hackpen Hill (2021); No Place to Hide (2023). He has written one work of non-fiction: The Sleep Room: A Very British Medical Scandal (2025).

== Early life and family ==
Stock was educated at Sherborne School in Dorset and at Magdalene College, Cambridge. He lives in Wiltshire with his wife Hilary Stock, a fine art photographer; they have three children. He has three brothers, one of whom is Andrew Stock, a past president of the Society of Wildlife Artists.

== Journalism ==
After working for some years as a freelance journalist in London, Stock moved to India, where he was a columnist for The Week and, from 1998 to 2000, a foreign correspondent for The Daily Telegraph in New Delhi. He also lived in Cochin, Kerala. On his return to England, he worked for The Daily Telegraph and was the editor of the Weekend section of the paper from 2005 till 2010. He left the paper in January 2010 to complete a trilogy of spy thrillers and returned in March 2013 to edit the paper's online books channel, before rejoining the staff as Weekend editor in June 2014. He left the paper in October 2015 to pursue his writing career. From 2020 to 2023 He was the Royal Literary Fund Writing Fellow at Mansfield College, University of Oxford.

== Bibliography ==
The Riot Act (1997) was published by Serpent's Tail and short-listed by the Crime Writers' Association for its best first novel award. It was published in France by Éditions Gallimard in 2002 as Lutte Des Casses as part of its Série Noire imprint.

The Cardamom Club (2003) was published by Blackamber (later part of Arcadia Books) in the UK, and by Penguin Books in India in 2004.

Dead Spy Running (2009), published by Blue Door, was the first book in the Legoland trilogy.

Games Traitors Play (2011), published by Blue Door, was the second book in the Legoland trilogy.

Dirty Little Secret (2012), published by Blue Door, was the concluding book in the Legoland trilogy.

Stock had signed a three-book deal in July 2008 with Blue Door, a HarperCollins imprint, for "a good six-figure sum", according to The Bookseller. The spy novel series, known as the Legoland trilogy, all feature MI6 officer Daniel Marchant. While researching for Dirty Little Secret he came across the Seraj, an Iranian fast attack craft based on the high-performance British speedboat, the Bradstone Challenger. Stock wrote a detailed article in the Daily Telegraph, on how the Iranians plan to use it as a fast attack boat against the United States Navy in any future conflict in the Strait of Hormuz.

To Snare a Spy (2017) was published by The Nare Hotel Co Ltd. It is a spy thriller featuring protagonist Noah, a teenager who learns of a Russian mole in the British government.

Find Me (2017) was written under the pen name J.S. Monroe and published by Head of Zeus. It was published in the UK in February 2017 and by Harlequin MIRA in the US in March 2017. Find Me is a 'high concept' psychological thriller featuring Jar, a young Irish writer, who is convinced that his girlfriend, who committed suicide five years ago at university, might still be alive. Publishers Marketplace has mentioned Find Me as having "notes of Harlan Coben's Tell No One and Ian McEwan's Sweet Tooth". Find Me had been translated into 14 languages by 2017.

Forget My Name (2018) was published by 'Head of Zeus under the pen name J.S. Monroe. This book is about a woman who loses her memory, and only remembers her home address, and has lost all her IDs after her bag is stolen.

The Other You (2020) was published by Head of Zeus under the pen name J.S. Monroe. It is a psychological thriller about a super recogniser called Kate, who suspects that her partner has been replaced by his doppelgänger.

The Man on Hackpen Hill (2021) was published by Head of Zeus under the pen name J.S. Monroe and is the third novel to feature DI Silas Hart, head of Swindon CID. A suspense thriller, it begins with the discovery of a dead body in the middle of a mathematical crop circle in Wiltshire.

No Place to Hide (2023) was published by Head of Zeus under the pen name J.S. Monroe. A psychological thriller, it is about a successful doctor in London whose life and marriage implode when his past as a medical student catches up with him.

The Sleep Room: A Very British Medical Scandal (2025), published by The Bridge Street Press, was Stock's first work of non-fiction. The book is about British psychiatrist William Sargant and his experimental treatment of women in the 60's and 70's at St Thomas' Hospital in London. As well as accessing Sargant's papers at the Wellcome Collection and recently released documents at National Archives in Kew, Stock contacted survivors of Sargant's experiments and the book includes their testimonies.

== Movie deal ==
Warner Bros. acquired the movie rights to the Dead Spy Running franchise in October 2008 to make the first of a proposed three-movie franchise. They signed on Charlie's Angels director McG to direct the movie along with Stephen Gaghan to write the screen play. In September 2012 Warner Brothers announced that they had hired Adam Wingard to direct, and Simon Barrett to rewrite the screenplay of Dead Spy Running. In 2014, McG bought the movie rights with his own company, Wonderland Sound and Vision.
