= Martin Roth (psychiatrist) =

British psychiatrist and academic (1917–2006)

- Born: 6 November 1917; Budapest, Austria-Hungary
- Died: 26 September 2006 (aged 88); Cambridge, Cambridgeshire, England
- Burial place: Cambridge City Cemetery
- Occupations: Academic and research
- Awards: Fellow of the Royal Society

Academic background
- Education: St Mary's Hospital, London; Maida Vale Hospital for Nervous Diseases; Maudsley Hospital

Academic work
- Discipline: Medicine
- Sub-discipline: Psychiatry
- Institutions: Newcastle University; University of Cambridge

Sir Martin Roth FRS (6 November 1917 – 26 September 2006) was a British psychiatrist, academic, and researcher. He was a leading figure in British psychiatry, especially in the study of mental illness and mental disorders of the elderly. He was the co-author of Clinical Psychiatry, an influential textbook that was used in England from 1954 through the 1980s.

== Early life ==
Roth was born in Budapest, Austria-Hungary, on 6 November 1917. He was the son of a synagogue cantor. His family moved to the East End of London, England when he was five years old. He attended the Davenant Foundation School in Loughton, Essex.

Roth trained in medicine at St. Mary's Hospital in Paddington, London, qualifying to practice medicine in 1941. He then trained in neurology under Russell Brain, 1st Baron Brain at Maida Vale Hospital for Nervous Diseases. Next, he went to Maudsley Hospital where he trained in psychiatry.

== Career ==
In 1948, Roth worked with Willy Mayer-Gross at Crichton Royal Hospital in Dumfries. After two years in 1950, he moved to Graylingwell Hospital, psychiatric hospital in Chichester, Sussex, where he was the director of clinical research. In 1954, Roth, Mayer-Gross, and Eliot Slater (a friend from Maudsley Hospital) published Clinical Psychiatry, a textbook that was released in three editions through 1977, was translated into five languages, and used in British medical schools through the 1980s. He became the director of the clinical research unit at Graylingwell Hospital in Chichester where he studied brain and strokes.

Roth was the chair of psychological medicine at Newcastle University from 1956 to 1977, establishing the main psychiatric clinical research center in Britain. At Newcastle, he created units for the study of child psychiatry, neurosis, and psychogeriatrics. He was also influential the field of clinical psychology and in the study of mental illness. Next, he was the first professor of psychiatry at University of Cambridge from 1977 to 1985. There, he was one of the pioneers in developing psychogeriatrics as a subspecialty, with an emphasis on Alzheimer's disease. Roth was a fellow at Trinity College, Cambridge in 1977 and 2006.

Roth authored more than 400 papers that were published in scholarly journals. He was an examiner in medicine at Royal College of Physicians from 1962 to 1964 and 1968 and 1972. He was a member of the council of the Royal College of Physicians from 1968 to 1971. He was the first president of the Royal College of Psychiatrists from 1971 to 1975. Roth was also a trustee of the Schizophrenia Research Fund, a charity founded by Miriam Rothschild

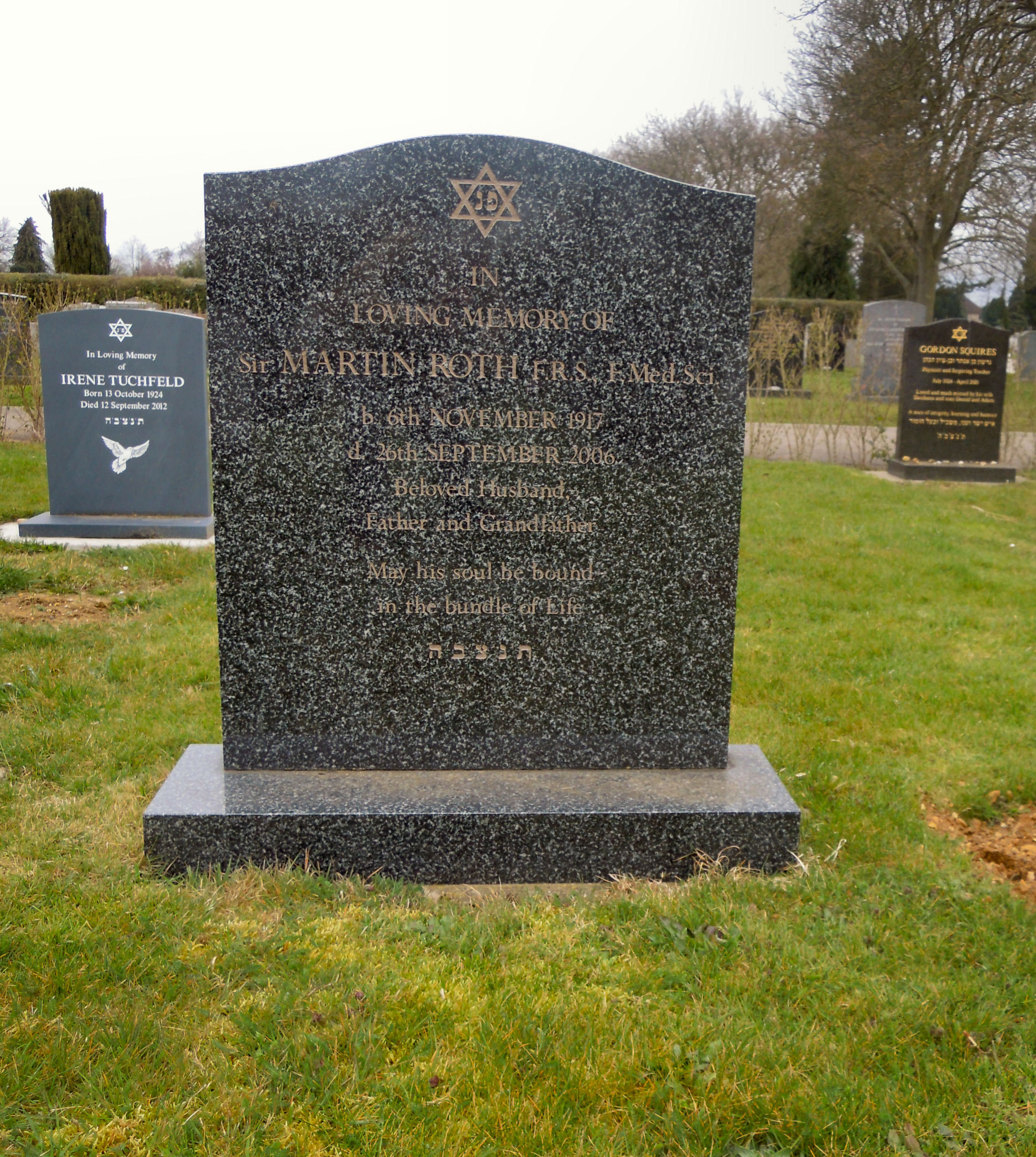
Roth's grave in Cambridge City Cemetery

== Honours ==
Martin Roth was knighted in the 1972 New Year Honours List. He was elected a Fellow of the Royal Society (FRS) in 1996 and of the Academy of Medical Sciences in 2001.

== Personal life ==
Roth married Constance Heller in 1945. The couple had three daughters.

Roth died on 26 September 2006 in Cambridge, Cambridgeshire at the age of 88 years. He was buried in Cambridge City Cemetery.

== Selected publications ==
=== Author ===
- Clinical Psychiatry. with Willy Mayer-Gross and Eliot Slater. London: Cassell, 1954.
- The Reality of Mental Illness. Cambridge: Cambridge University Press, 1986. ISBN 0521321514
- CAMDEX—the Cambridge Examination for Mental Disorders of the Elderly. with Felicia A. Huppert, C. Q. Mountjoy, and Elizabeth Tym. Cambridge: Cambridge University Press, 1988. ISBN 9783929224023
- Ageing and the Aged in Contemporary Society. Indiana University Institute for Advanced Study, 1993.
- Philosophical Foundations of Neurolaw. Lanham: Lexington Books, 2017. ISBN 9781498539678

=== Editor ===
- Psychiatry, Human Rights and the Law. with Robert Bluglass. Cambridge University Press, 1986. ISBN 978-0521261944
- Handbook of Anxiety, vol. 1: Biological, Clinical, and Cultural Perspectives. with Russell Noyes Jr. and Graham D Burrows. Amsterdam: Elsevier, 1988. ISBN 044490476X
- Handbook of Anxiety, vol. 2: Classification, Etiological Factors, and Associated Disturbances. with Russell Noyes Jr. and Graham D Burrows. Amsterdam: Elsevier, 1988. ISBN 9780444904898
- Handbook of Anxiety, vol. 3: The Neurobiology of Anxiety. with Russell Noyes Jr. and Graham D Burrows. Amsterdam: Elsevier, 1990. ISBN 0444812369
- Handbook of Anxiety, vol. 4: The Treatment of Anxiety. with Russell Noyes Jr. and Graham D Burrows. Amsterdam: Elsevier, 1990. ISBN 978-0444904768
- Handbook of Anxiety, vol. 5: Contemporary Issues and Prospects for Research in Anxiety Disorders. with Russell Noyes Jr. and Graham D Burrows. Amsterdam: Elsevier, 1992. ISBN 9780444896025
