= Alexis Charles Doxat =

Recipient of the Victoria Cross

Alexis Charles Doxat VC
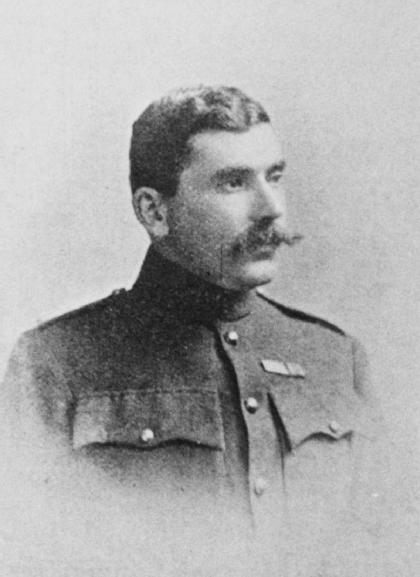
- Born: 9 April 1867; Surbiton, Surrey
- Died: 29 November 1942 (aged 75); Cambridge, England
- Burial place: City Cemetery, Cambridge
- Military career
- Allegiance: United Kingdom
- Branch: British Army
- Rank: Major
- Units: Imperial Yeomanry; King's Royal Rifle Corps
- Conflicts: Second Boer War; World War I
- Awards: Victoria Cross

Major Alexis Charles Doxat, VC (9 April 1867 – 29 November 1942) was an English recipient of the Victoria Cross, the highest and most prestigious award for gallantry in the face of the enemy that can be awarded to British and Commonwealth forces.

== Background ==
Doxat was educated at Norwich School before going on to Philberd's, Maidenhead. He joined the 7th Militia Battalion The Rifle Brigade in 1892.

Following the outbreak of the Second Boer War in 1899, Doxat was commissioned a Lieutenant in the Yorkshire Dragoons within the 3rd Battalion, Imperial Yeomanry on 3 January 1900.

== Details ==
Doxat was 33 years old, and a lieutenant in the 3rd Battalion, Imperial Yeomanry during the Second Boer War when the following deed took place on 20 October 1900 near Zeerust, South Africa, for which he was awarded the VC:

On the 20th October, 1900, near Zeerust, Lieutenant Doxat proceeded with a party of Mounted Infantry to reconnoitre a position held by 100 Boers on a ridge of kopjes. When within 300 yards of the position the enemy opened a heavy fire on Lieutenant Doxat's party, which then retired, leaving one of their number who had lost his horse. Lieutenant Doxat seeing the dangerous position in which the man was placed galloped back under a very heavy fire and brought him on his horse to a place of safety.

He received the Victoria Cross from King Edward VII, in person, during an investiture at St James's Palace 17 December 1901.

His medals are now on display at the Lord Ashcroft Gallery in the Imperial War Museum, London

== Bibliography ==
- Harries, R.; Cattermole, P.; Mackintosh, P. (1991). A History of Norwich School: King Edward VI's Grammar School at Norwich. Norwich: Friends of Norwich School. ISBN 978-0-9518561-1-6.
