= Frederick Robertson (RAF officer) =

British flying ace of WWII

- Born: 25 July 1918; Romsey, England
- Died: 13 August 1943 (aged 25); Foulsham, England
- Burial place: Cambridge City Cemetery
- Military career
- Allegiance: United Kingdom
- Branch: Royal Air Force
- Rank: Flying Officer
- Units: No. 66 Squadron; No. 261 Squadron; No. 92 Squadron
- Conflicts: Second World War: Battle of France; Battle of Britain; Siege of Malta
- Awards: Distinguished Flying Medal

Frederick Robertson DFM (25 July 1918 – 31 August 1943) was a British flying ace of the Royal Air Force (RAF) during the Second World War. He is credited with the destruction of at least twelve aircraft.

Born in Romsey, Robertson was a member of the Royal Air Force Volunteer Reserve when he was called up for service in the RAF on the outbreak of the Second World War. He served with No. 66 Squadron during the later stages of the Battle of France and in the first phase of the Battle of Britain, claiming his first aerial victories during this time. In late July 1940 he was sent to Malta where he flew Hawker Hurricane fighters during the siege of that island. He was one of the most successful RAF pilots in the early stages of the siege, claiming several aerial victories and being awarded the Distinguished Flying Medal. Repatriated to the United Kingdom after 12 months, he carried out instructing duties until early 1942. He then served with a series of night fighter squadrons until his death at Foulsham in a flying accident on 31 August 1943.

== Early life ==
Frederick Neal Robertson was born on 25 July 1918 in Romsey, England, the son of Frederick and Beatrice Robertson. His father, a Scotsman, was an officer in the Gordon Highlanders who had been killed during the Spring Offensive, a few months before the birth of his son. Raised in Lockerley in Hampshire, after completing his schooling Robertson trained as a marine engineer. He enlisted in the Royal Air Force Volunteer Reserve in September 1937 and trained as a pilot.

== Second World War ==
On the outbreak of the Second World War in 1939, Robertson was called up for service in the Royal Air Force. His initial war service was with the Fleet Air Arm, to which he had been loaned. He flew with 769 Naval Air Squadron, training on the aircraft carrier HMS Furious with Gloster Gladiator and Fairey Swordfish biplanes. In October he was posted to No. 66 Squadron. This was based at Duxford and, with its Supermarine Spitfire fighters, was tasked with intercepting unidentified aircraft and patrols along the North Sea coastline. During the evacuation of the British Expeditionary Force from Dunkirk from late May to early June 1940, the squadron helped with providing aerial cover in the area. On 2 June Robertson destroyed a Junkers Ju 88 medium bomber over Dunkirk but when his Spitfire was hit by anti-aircraft fire had to bale out to the west of the evacuation beaches. He was able to find a berth back to England on one of the last vessels to take off British military personnel from Dunkirk.

After the evacuation of the BEF was complete, No. 66 Squadron resumed its patrolling duties over the North Sea but was drawn into the aerial fighting over the southeast of England as the Luftwaffe escalated its operations. On 10 July, Robertson was one of three pilots that shared in the shooting down of a Dornier Do 17 medium bomber off Winterton. A week later he was one of several pilots sent to Hullavington and tasked with flying a Hawker Hurricane to Abbotsinch in Scotland. There they and twelve Hurricanes were embarked on the aircraft carrier HMS Argus, destined for Malta as part of No. 418 Flight. This was to ferry the Hurricanes to Malta to serve in the aerial defences against the Regia Aeronautica (Royal Italian Air Force) that was besieging the island.

=== Siege of Malta ===
Robertson flew his Hurricane off Argus on 2 August, subsequently arriving over the Luqa airfield on Malta low on fuel after a flight of 380 miles (610 km). Making his approach to the airfield, he ran out of fuel and crashed the Hurricane. The pilots had believed that they were only making a ferry flight to Malta so did not bring any kit with them, expecting to be flown to Gibraltar by flying boat. Instead, they were advised that No. 418 Flight was to remain on the island. Two weeks after arriving on Malta, the flight was integrated into what became No. 261 Squadron, the island's first fighter squadron. Its initial engagements were with Italian fighters carrying out sweeps to draw out the defenders. Robertson made his first claim on Malta on 20 August, when he damaged a Fiat CR.42 Falco fighter over the island. On 25 September he probably destroyed a Macchi C.200 Saetta fighter and damaged another C.200 on 4 October. He damaged a CR.42 on 23 November. A Savoia-Marchetti SM.79 Sparviero medium bomber was destroyed on 28 November by Robertson although he initially claimed it as a probable; it was not until two surviving crew members were retrieved from the sea that its destruction was confirmed. Flying a night sortie on 18 December, Robertson destroyed another SM.79 2 miles (3.2 km) east of Kalafrana.

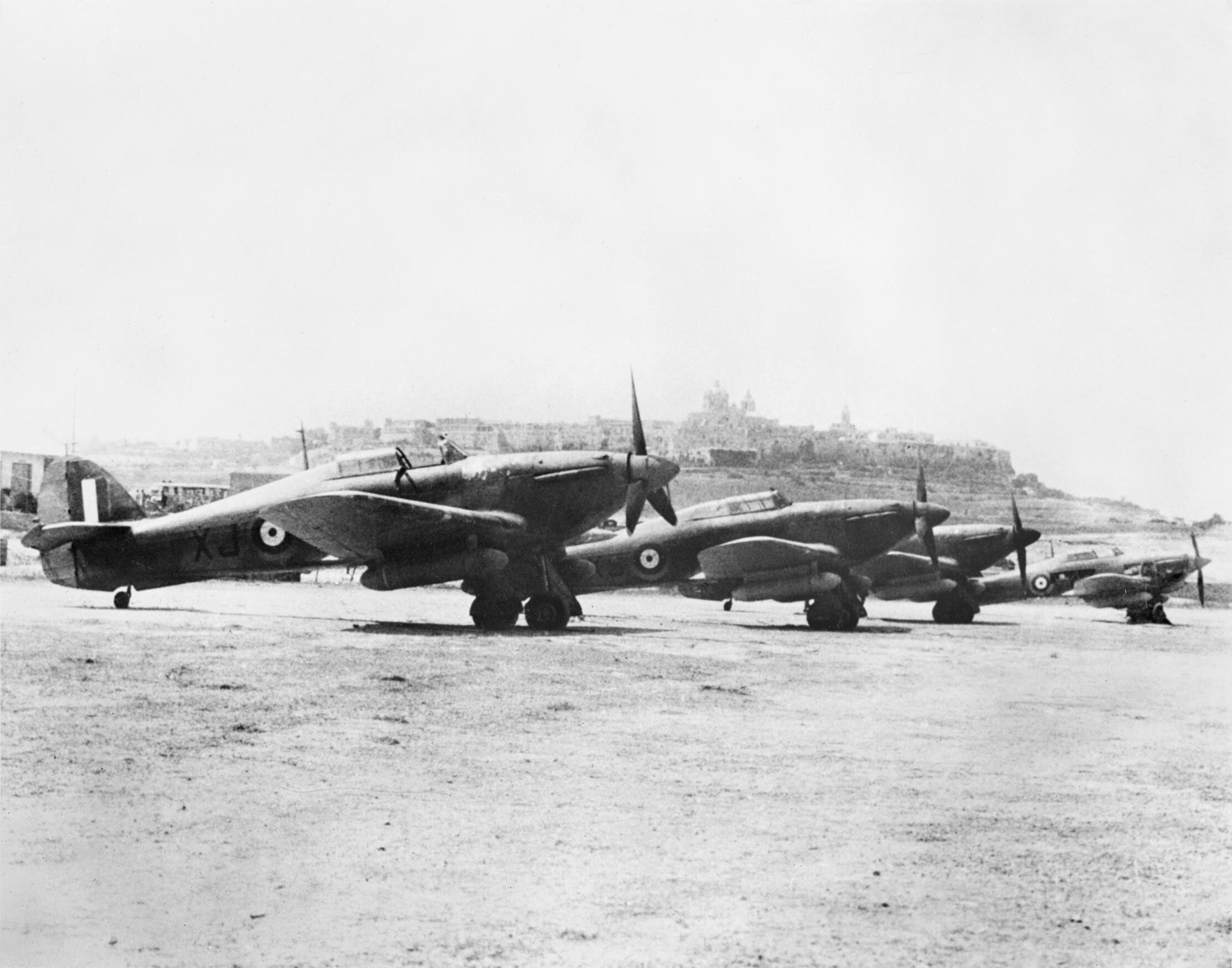
A line up of Hawker Hurricane fighters of No. 261 Squadron at Luqa, Malta

By this time, the squadron was operating from Takali as the airstrip at Luqa was required for use by recently arrived RAF bombers. On 10 January 1941, the squadron helped provide cover for the stricken aircraft carrier HMS Illustrious as it made its way to Malta with major damage after being bombed. At this phase of the siege, the Luftwaffe commenced bombing operations alongside the Italians against Malta. On 19 January, Robertson shot down a Junkers Ju 87 dive bomber to the north of Grand Harbour, also probably destroying a CR.42. He claimed another CR.42 as probably destroyed over St. Paul's Bay and a further CR.42 was confirmed as destroyed by Robertson the same day, its pilot baling out over Valletta. He damaged a SM.79 on 1 February and subsequently shot down a CR.42 off Gozo later in the day. Three days later he destroyed a Ju 88 to the east of Marsaskala. Robertson damaged another Ju 88 on an 8 February night sortie. On 25 February he damaged a Do 17. Two aircraft were shot down by Robertson near Filfla on 5 March: a Ju 88 and a Messerschmitt Bf 109 fighter. He damaged a Messerschmitt Bf 110 heavy fighter on 16 March. Two days later, an announcement was made in respect of Robertson being awarded the Distinguished Flying Medal in recognition of his successes. The citation, published in The London Gazette on 18 March, read:

This airman has displayed great gallantry in his many recent engagements, often against heavy odds. In March, 1941, he destroyed two enemy aircraft bringing his total number of victories to at least eight.

— London Gazette, No. 35110, 18 March 1941

Robertson shot down a pair of Ju 87s over Rabat on 23 March but his Hurricane was set afire in the engagement and he had to bale out, landing near Luqa. One of the most successful RAF fighter pilots serving at Malta at this time, he was rested from operations the following month, and No. 261 Squadron was subsequently disbanded. After a few weeks in Cairo, he was repatriated to the United Kingdom in July.

=== Later war service ===
In August Robertson was posted to No. 60 Operational Training Unit (OTU) to serve as an instructor. He fulfilled similar duties at No. 54 OTU from October to January 1942 at which time he was posted to No. 219 Squadron. Based at Tangmere, this carried out night fighting duties with Bristol Beaufighter heavy fighters. In April, and by this time now commissioned as a pilot officer, he was posted to No. 153 Squadron. Based at Ballyhalbert in Northern Ireland, the squadron did night patrols with its Beaufighters. It was transferred to North Africa at the end of the year. However, Robertson, now holding the rank of flying officer, did not go with it and instead was posted to No. 96 Squadron.

A Beaufighter unit, No. 96 Squadron was based at Honiley and, like Robertson's previous squadron, was engaged in night patrols but with intruder sorties to German-occupied France. Here Robertson was paired with Sergeant Bertram Dye as his observer. While flying a night sortie on 31 August, his Beaufighter collided with a Boeing B-17 Flying Fortress heavy bomber of the United States Army Air Force. The aircraft crashed at Foulsham, killing Robertson and Dye. Nine of the eleven crew of the B-17 were killed as well. A memorial was dedicated on 12 May 2017 to the dead airmen near the crash site by the Foulsham Archive Group.

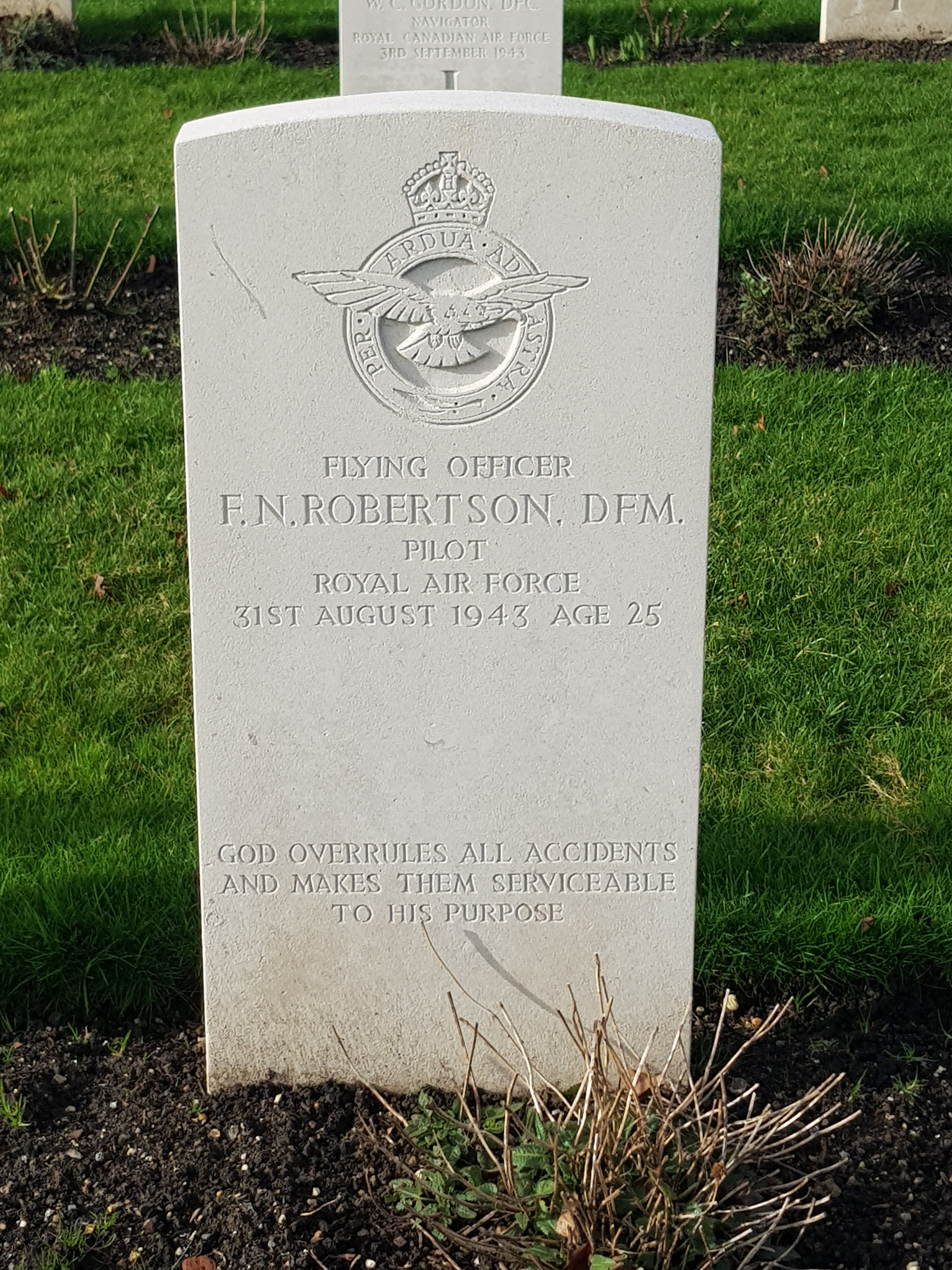
The grave of Robertson at Cambridge City Cemetery

Robertson is buried at Cambridge City Cemetery. He is credited with having destroyed twelve aircraft, one being shared with another pilot, and damaging seven more. He is also credited with the probable destruction of three aircraft.
