= The Sleep Room (book) =

2025 book by Jon Stock

The Sleep Room: A Very British Medical Scandal
- First edition, UK publishing
- Author: Jon Stock
- Language: English
- Publisher: Little, Brown Book Group (UK); Abrams Press (US)
- Publication date: 3 April 2025 (UK); 22 July 2025 (US)
- Pages: 432
- ISBN: 978-1-4197-7447-8

The Sleep Room: A Very British Medical Scandal is a 2025 book by Jon Stock that describes psychiatrist William Sargant and his experimental treatment of women in the 1960s and 1970s at St Thomas' Hospital in London. Published in the UK by the Bridge Street Press, an imprint of Little, Brown Book Group, the book was reviewed in a number of publications. In the US, the book was published by Abrams Press with the title The Sleep Room: A Sadistic Psychiatrist and the Women Who Survived Him.
