= Maudsley Hospital =

Psychiatric hospital in London, England

Coordinates: 51°28′08″N 00°05′28″W

- South London and Maudsley NHS Foundation Trust
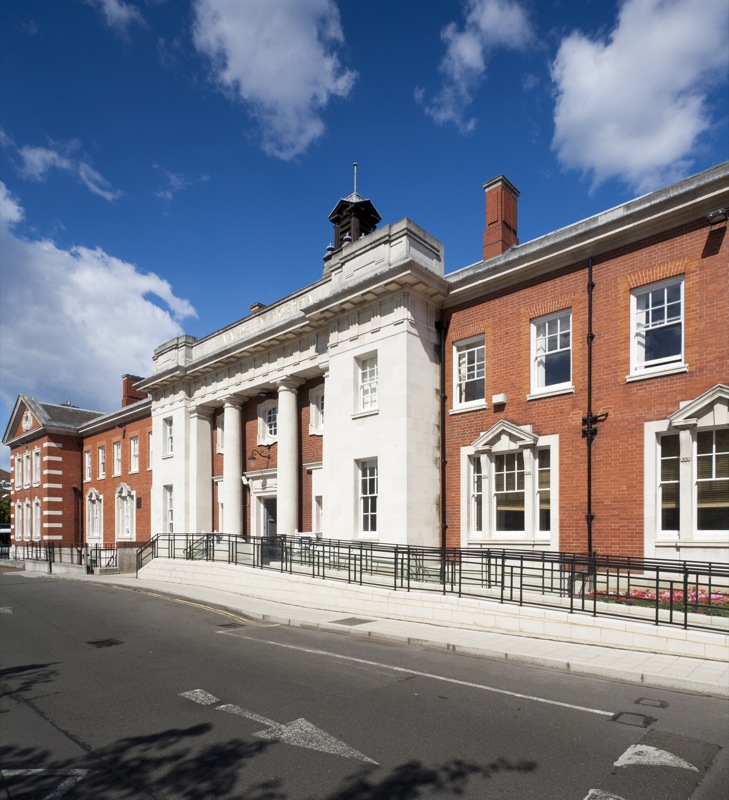
- Maudsley Hospital

Geography
- Location: Denmark Hill, London, England, United Kingdom

Organisation
- Care system: National Health Service
- Type: Specialist
- Affiliated university: King's College London

Services
- Emergency department: No
- Beds: 250
- Speciality: Psychiatric hospital

History
- Founded: 1923

Links
- Website: slam.nhs.uk/maudsley-hospital

The Maudsley Hospital is a British psychiatric hospital in south London. The Maudsley is the largest mental health training institution in the UK. It is part of South London and Maudsley NHS Foundation Trust, and works in partnership with the Institute of Psychiatry, King's College London. The hospital was one of the originating institutions in producing the Maudsley Prescribing Guidelines. It is part of the King's Health Partners academic health science centre and the National Institute for Health and Care Research (NIHR) Biomedical Research Centre for Mental Health.

== History ==
=== Early history ===
The Maudsley story dates from 1907, when once leading Victorian psychiatrist Henry Maudsley offered London County Council £30,000 (apparently earned from lucrative private practice in the West End) to help found a new mental hospital that would be exclusively for early and acute cases rather than chronic cases, have an out-patients' clinic and provide for teaching and research. Maudsley's associate Frederick Walker Mott had proposed the original idea and he conducted the negotiations, with Maudsley remaining anonymous until the offer was accepted. Mott, a neuropathologist, had been influenced by a visit to Emil Kraepelin's psychiatric clinic with attached postgraduate teaching facilities in Munich, Germany. The Council agreed to contribute half the building costs – eventually rising to £70,000 – and then covered the running costs which were almost twice as high per bed as the large asylums. The hospital also incorporated the Central Pathological Laboratory, transferred from Claybury Hospital, run by Mott. Construction of the hospital was completed in 1915. An Act of Parliament had to be obtained, that year, to allow the institution to accept voluntary patients without needing to certify them as insane.

However, before it could open, the building was requisitioned to treat war veterans. After the war it was returned to the control of London County Council and it finally opened as the Maudsley Hospital in February 1923. The first superintendent was psychiatrist Edward Mapother, while Frederick Golla took over the running of the pathology lab from Mott. Both were more sceptical of the Kraepelinian categories of diagnosis, and took a more pragmatic and eclectic view on causation and treatment. Psychiatrist Mary Barkas worked here between 1923 and 1927 in the children's department established by William Dawson.

In the interwar period the Maudsley Hospital engaged in widespread experimentation with animal hormones, both in small doses to rectify supposed deficits and in overdoses as a shock therapy. Numerous psychoactive drugs and procedures were tried out, in what has been described as 'unconstrained experimentation'. One of those involved, as a trainee and then junior doctor, was the controversial William Sargant. The hospital's nursing staff comprised a matron, assistant matron, six sisters and 19 staff nurses with at least three years general hospital training, supported by 23 probationers and 12 male nurses. It had a good reputation for training nurses and some applicants even travelled overseas to train there. A report (held at Bethlem's Archives & Museum) from a nurse who trained at the Maudsley shows some of the work of a new trainee: "Apart from observation and simple treatment, nurses are trained in special investigations and therapy. They carry out many of the routine psychometric tests, help as technicians in the ward laboratories, and are instructors in occupational therapy".

The Maudsley Hospital Medical School was established in 1924 and eventually became a well-respected teaching centre. In 1932, Mapother described it as "the main postgraduate school of mental medicine in England." The Maudsley Hospital had initially struggled to secure funding from the Medical Research Council, and, to undertake further research and develop the Medical School, but a substantial grant was obtained in 1938 from American charity the Rockefeller Foundation. Originally, there was no provision for the treatment of children and the rapid growth in this patient population was unforeseen. A child guidance clinic was set up under the directorship of Dr William Moodie, the deputy medical superintendent, in 1928. The late 1920s and 1930s saw a rapid growth in the number of patients treated: this growth led to an ongoing building programme including a secure unit, completed in 1931, and an out-patients department, completed in 1933.

=== Links with eugenic research ===
Both Mapother and then deputy Aubrey Lewis supported involuntary eugenic sterilisation, unequivocally recommending it to the Brock Committee in 1932. Lewis was a member of the Eugenics Society and a 1934 chapter he authored is "remarkable for its total admiration for the German work and workers". With the spread of National Socialist (Nazi) laws in Germany from 1933, however, they decried the Nazi conflation of therapy and punishment, a move partly attributed to political and funding expediency. The Maudsley maintained its links with Germany, taking on both pro-Nazis and Jewish émigrés through fellowships provided by the Commonwealth Fund and, after 1935, large scale funds from the American Rockefeller Foundation. Eliot Slater continued to visit Munich through the 1930s and contributed to academic festivities honouring Nazi eugenicist Ernst Rudin. During this time, Maudsley psychiatry developed a distinctive combination of practical experimentation and intellectual scepticism. Influential psychiatrist Aubrey Lewis became clinical director of the Maudsley in 1936.

At the outbreak of the Second World War, and with the threat of air-raids, the Maudsley Hospital closed and staff dispersed to two locations: a temporary hospital at Mill Hill School in north London and Belmont Hospital in Sutton, Surrey. Staff returned to the Maudsley site in 1945 and three years later the Maudsley joined up with the Bethlem Royal Hospital to become partners in the newly established National Health Service (NHS).

=== Post-war ===
In the 1960s a group from the Maudsley Hospital attacked the use of lithium for mood disorders. The head, Aubrey Lewis, called it "dangerous nonsense", and colleagues published that it was therapeutically ineffective. Their objections have recently been described as 'poorly grounded' and having steered practitioners away from a beneficial agent. In 1999, the Maudsley Hospital became part of the South London and Maudsley NHS Foundation Trust ("SLaM"), along with the Bethlem Royal Hospital.

== Services ==
The trust manages one of the UK's few biomedical research centres specialising in mental health. The centre, managed in partnership with the Institute of Psychiatry, King's College London, is based on the Maudsley Hospital campus and funded by the National Institute for Health and Care Research (NIHR).

== Media ==
In 2013 South London and Maudsley NHS Foundation Trust (‘SLaM’) took part in a Channel 4 observational documentary entitled Bedlam. The final programme, "Breakdown", focused on older adults, including those admitted to the Older Adults Ward at Maudsley Hospital.

== Notable staff ==
- Annie Altschul pioneer of mental health nursing in the UK.
- Trevor Clay General Secretary of the Royal College of Nursing
- Felix Post pioneer of Geriatric psychiatry.

== See also ==
- Healthcare in London
- List of hospitals in England
- King's Health Partners
