= Edward Mapother =

English physician

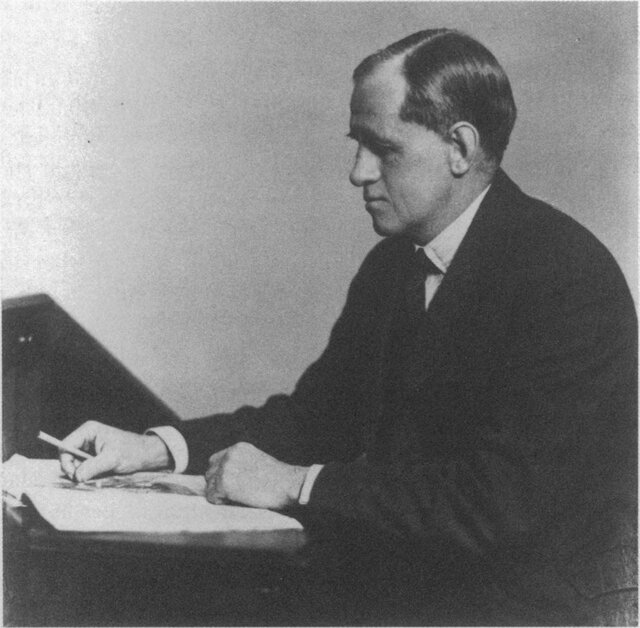
- Born: 12 July 1881; Dublin, Ireland
- Died: 20 March 1940
- Education: M.D. (1908); Primary Fellowship (1909); F.R.C.S. (1910); D.P.M.
- Known for: Contributions to the field of psychiatry

Edward Mapother (12 July 1881 – 20 March 1940) was a physician who, as the first medical superintendent of the Maudsley Hospital and creator of the Institute of Psychiatry, King's College London, was perhaps the most influential figure establishing clinical and academic psychiatry in England.

Born in Dublin, from landed gentry, he was brought up in England from the age of 7. His father was an eminent surgeon who moved to private practice in London, and Mapother completed his own MD in 1908. He undertook locum work in mental asylums and then served in the medical corps during World War I, serving as a surgeon in France, Mesopotamia and India, developing an interest in shell shock.

Mapother may also have been influenced in his chosen specialty by an apparent mental illness of his older sister, who appears to have had long stays in psychiatric hospitals and to have died in one of them - the Bethlem Hospital.

Mapother married Barbara Reynolds in 1915. Nevertheless, he appears to have been homosexual.

He was involved in activities of the Eugenics Society and was often consulted about abortions for poor women.
