= Geriatric psychiatry =

Medical speciality

- System: Nervous system, mental health
- Significant diseases: Alzheimer's disease, vascular dementia, dementia with Lewy bodies, Parkinson's disease, depression, bipolar disorder, schizophrenia, delirium, behavioral and psychological symptoms of dementia, substance use disorder
- Significant tests: Mental status examination, cognitive testing, neuroimaging
- Specialist: Geriatric psychiatrist

Geriatric psychiatry, also known as geropsychiatry, psychogeriatrics or psychiatry of old age, is a branch of medicine and a subspecialty of psychiatry dealing with the study, prevention, and treatment of neurodegenerative, cognitive impairment, and mental disorders in people of old age. Geriatric psychiatry as a subspecialty has significant overlap with the specialties of geriatric medicine, behavioral neurology, neuropsychiatry, neurology, and general psychiatry. Geriatric psychiatry has become an official subspecialty of psychiatry with a defined curriculum of study and core competencies.

== Scope ==
Geriatric psychiatrist
Occupation
- Names: Doctor, Psychiatry Specialist
- Occupation type: Specialty
- Activity sectors: Medicine, Psychiatry

Description
- Education required: Doctor of Medicine (M.D.); Doctor of Osteopathic Medicine (D.O.); Bachelor of Medicine, Bachelor of Surgery (MBBS/MBChB)
- Fields of employment: Hospitals, Clinics, Nursing Homes

A geriatric psychiatrist is a physician who specializes in the field of medical sub-specialty called geriatric psychiatry. A geriatric psychiatrist holds a board certification after specialized training after attaining a medical degree, residency, and an additional geriatric psychiatry fellowship training program. The requirements may vary by countries. Some geriatric psychiatrists also conduct research to determine the cause and better treatments for neurodegenerative disorders and late-life mental health disorders.

Geriatric psychiatrists may perform neurological examinations, mental status examination, laboratory investigations, neuroimaging, cognitive assessments to investigate the causes of psychiatric or neurologic symptoms in old age.

=== Diseases ===
Diseases and disorders diagnosed or managed by geriatric psychiatrists include, but are not limited to:

- Late-life Presentations of Psychiatric Disorders
  - Late onset of depression is associated with higher rates of cardiovascular disease, higher risk of suicide, and higher possibility of treatment resistant depression.
    - Melancholic Depression
  - Anxiety Disorders can be characterized by restlessness, irritability, and muscle tension, but in older adults can be misinterpreted as manifestation of aging.
  - Bipolar Disorder in older adults is associated with increased risk of premature death, increased risk of dementia and cognitive deficits.
  - Schizophrenia after the age of 65 is considered very-late onset and is associated with higher rates of psychosis, which are often secondary to other medical comorbidities.
  - Personality Disorders
- Dementia: often focusing on behavioral disturbances related to mild cognitive impairment and different types of dementia such as:
  - Alzheimer's Disease
  - Vascular Dementia
  - Frontotemporal Dementia
  - Dementia with Lewy bodies
  - Parkinson's Disease
- Medical-Psychiatric disorders such as catatonia and delirium.
- Many risk factors for Substance use disorder are seen commonly in the elderly population such as: polypharmacy, multiple co-morbid health conditions, and social isolation.
- Neuropsychiatric complications from stroke, Multiple Sclerosis.

== History ==
=== Origins ===
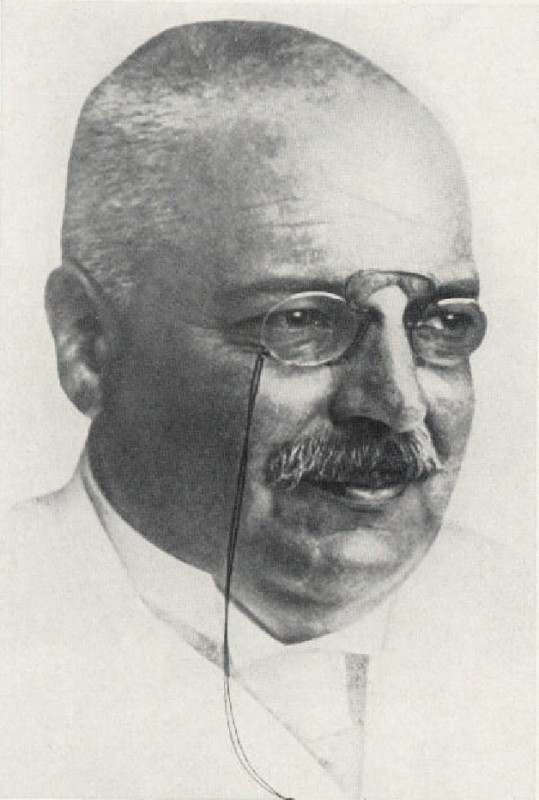
Alois Alzheimer (1915), a German psychiatrist who identified the pathology involved in Alzheimer's disease

The origins of geriatric psychiatry began with Alois Alzheimer, a German psychiatrist and neuropathologist who first identified amyloid plaques and neurofibrillary tangles in a fifty-year-old woman he called Auguste D. These plaques and tangles were later identified as being responsible for her behavioural symptoms, short-term memory loss, and psychiatric symptoms. These brain anomalies would become identifiers of what later became known as Alzheimer's disease.

=== Subspecialty ===
The subspecialty of geriatric psychiatry originated in the United Kingdom in the 1950s. In 1958, the first mental health service was designed specifically for the elderly under the guidance of Dr. Ronald Robinson in Scotland. At this time, much of the knowledge related to this field was based on notable psychiatrists in the United Kingdom including: Sir Martin Roth (psychiatrist), Dr. Felix Post, Dr. Aubrey Lewis, and Dr. David Henderson.

In the United States, the American Association for Geriatric Psychiatry was founded in 1978 under the direction of its first president, Dr. Sanford Finkel. It was not until 1991 when the American Board of Psychiatry and Neurology began to conduct examinations for this subspecialty.

In Canada, the Royal College of Physicians and Surgeons of Canada recognized the subspecialty of Geriatric Psychiatry in 2009, though the first examinations did not take place until 2013,

== Diagnosis ==
There are many different screening tools used in the elderly.

- The Patient Health Questionnare-9 (PHQ-9) is used to screen for depression.
- The Generalized Anxiety Disorder 7 (GAD-7) is typically used to screen for anxiety, however it is typically used in younger adults (19–64). In those 65+, the Geriatric Anxiety Inventory is used in its place.
- The Alcohol Use Disorders Identification Test (AUDIT-C) is used to assess alcohol consumption to screen for alcohol use disorder.

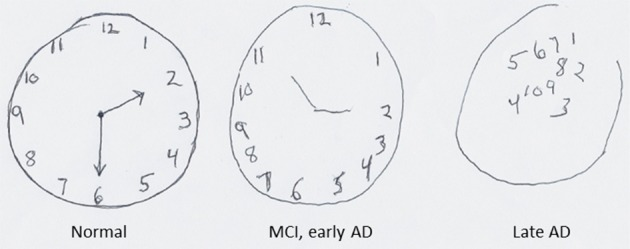
Caption Clock Drawing Test to Differentiate between Normal vs. MCI vs. AD

- Three tools used for detection of mild cognitive impairment and dementia include: Mini-Mental State Examination (MMSE), Montreal Cognitive Assessment (MoCA), and the Clock Drawing Test.
  - The Clock Drawing Test (CDT) can be used to quickly assess cognitive function through visuospatial skills and executive function.
  - The CDT can be interpreted as normal, Mild Cognitive Impairment (MCI), possible Alzheimer's Disease (AD), or other diagnoses.

== Treatments ==
When determining appropriate next steps in treatment for psychiatric conditions in the elderly, the discussion first focuses around pharmacologic intervention vs. non-pharmacologic intervention.

=== Pharmacologic interventions ===
In the geriatric population, careful pharmacologic consideration is required due to possibility of drug-drug interactions, co-morbid conditions, and risk of adverse effects. In 2023, The American Geriatric Society updated the Beers Criteria to outline potentially inappropriate medications in the elderly. The Beers Criteria is meant to identify medications that may cause harm to geriatric patients, but it requires case by case interpretation for each patient.

Common psychiatric medications used in the elderly include:

- Antidepressants and anxiolytics such as SSRIs, SNRIs, TCAs, MAOis.
- Antipsychotics such as Aripiprazole and Quetiapine.
- Mood stabilizers such as Lithium and Valproic Acid.

Adverse effects, particularly concerning in this age group include drowsiness, increased risk of falls, postural hypotension, and sleep disturbances.

=== Non-pharmacologic interventions ===
Non-pharmacologic interventions such as exercise, phototherapy, and psychotherapy can be tried before, after, or in conjunction with pharmacologic treatment. Two common psychotherapy styles used in the elderly are cognitive behavioral therapy and psychodynamic therapy. Supportive psychotherapy can often be valuable, especially for clients dealing with existential issues or with early stage dementia.

When pharmacologic intervention has failed, electroconvulsive therapy is an option for treatment resistant depression, agitation secondary to delirium, catatonia, psychosis, and other psychiatric conditions in the elderly.

== Training ==
=== International ===
The International Psychogeriatric Association is an international community of scientists and healthcare geriatric professionals working for mental health in aging. International Psychogeriatrics is the official journal of the International Psychogeriatric Association.

=== Canada ===
The Royal College of Physicians and Surgeons of Canada is responsible for training and certifying geriatric psychiatrists in Canada. Geriatric psychiatry requires an additional year of subspecialty fellowship training in addition to general psychiatry training.

=== United Kingdom ===
The Royal College of Psychiatrists is responsible for training and certifying psychiatrists in the United Kingdom. Within the Royal College of Psychiatrists, the Faculty of Old Age Psychiatry is responsible for training in Old Age Psychiatry. Doctors who have membership of the Royal College of Psychiatrists can undertake a three or four-year training program to become a specialist in Old Age Psychiatry. There is currently a shortage of old age psychiatrists in the United Kingdom.

=== United States ===
The American Association for Geriatric Psychiatry (AAGP) is the national organization representing health care providers specializing in late life mental disorders. The American Journal of Geriatric Psychiatry is the official journal of the AAGP.The American Board of Psychiatry and Neurology and the American Osteopathic Board of Neurology and Psychiatry both issue a board certification in geriatric psychiatry.

After a 4-year residency in psychiatry, a psychiatrist can complete a one-year fellowship in geriatric psychiatry.

== See also ==
- Geriatrics
- Psychiatry
- Neuropsychiatry
- Mild cognitive impairment
- Dementia
- Delirium
- Late life depression
