= Roz Shafran =

British child psychologist

Roz Shafran FMedSci
- Born: 1 January 1970 (age 56)
- Education: University of Oxford; King's College London
- Scientific career
- Workplaces: University of British Columbia; University of Oxford; University of Reading; University College London
- Thesis: An investigation into the cognitive-behavioural model of obsessive-compulsive disorder (O.C.D.) : can this be reconciled with a neurological deficit model? (1995)

Roz Shafran FMedSci (born January 1, 1970) is a British consultant clinical psychologist who is Emeritus Professor of Translational Psychology at the UCL Great Ormond Street Institute of Child Health. She is particularly known for her pioneering research on perfectionism and its effects on mental health, as well as her leadership in creating and directing the Charlie Waller Institute.

== Early life and education ==
Shafran was born in London. She studied experimental psychology at St Edmund Hall, Oxford University, graduating in 1991 with a congratulatory first. She later obtained her Ph.D. from the Institute of Psychiatry, Psychology and Neuroscience in 1995. Her research, which focussed on obsessive–compulsive disorder, laid the foundation for her later work in clinical psychology. She qualified as a clinical psychologist and was accredited as a CBT therapist. Shafran worked as a Killam Post-Doctoral Fellowship at the University of British Columbia under Jack Rachman. At the time, she was volunteering at Great Ormond Street Hospital, where she became interested in medically unexplained symptoms. She worked alongside Rachel Bryant-Waugh on eating disorders. Her interests in obsessive compulsive disorder and eating disorders motivated her to work with Christopher Fairburn at the University of Oxford.

== Career ==
Shafran moved to the University of Reading as the inaugural Charlie Waller Chair of Evidence-Based Psychological Treatment, where she founded and directed the Charlie Waller Institute of Evidence-Based Psychological Treatment. In 2013 Shafran was appointed a professor at UCL Great Ormond Street Institute of Child Health, where she works to improve access to effective psychological therapies and developing new interventions.

Shafran investigates perfectionism, a transdiagnostic factor linked to multiple psychological disorders. Her work has significantly advanced the understanding of how perfectionism contributes to mental health issues, leading to the development of specialised interventions. Her research extends to the mental health of children with chronic physical conditions, the psychological impact of long COVID in young people, and the development of low-intensity psychological treatments for children with epilepsy.

The psychological medicine research team Shafran developed and leads at UCL was recognised by the Child and Adolescent Mental Health Services for "The Lucy Project", a drop-in mental health booth that provided accessible, low-intensity early interventions for young people and their families who were concerned about mental health. The booth was named after Lucy Van Pelt, the character from Peanuts. The booth received The BMJ's Mental Health Team of the Year Award in 2021.

== Awards and honours ==
- 2010 British Psychological Society Award for Distinguished Contributions to Professional Psychology
- 2019 Eric Taylor 'Translational Research into Practice Award'
- 2019 Honorary Fellow of the British Association of Behavioural and Cognitive Psychotherapy
- 2021 BMJ Mental Health Team of the Year Award
- 2023 UCL Great Ormond Street Institute of Child Health Diversity and Inclusion Role Model Award
- 2025 Fellow of the Academy of Medical Sciences
- 2026 British Psychological Society Lifetime Achievement Award

== Selected publications ==
=== Books ===
- Roz Shafran; Ursula Saunders; Alice Welham (2022). How to cope when your child can't: comfort, help and hope for parents. London: Constable & Robinson. ISBN 978-1-4721-3901-6. OCLC 1289262535.
- Sarah Egan; Tracey Wade; Roz Shafran; Martin M. Antony (2014). Cognitive-behavioral treatment of perfectionism. New York: Guilford Press. ISBN 978-1-4625-1698-8. OCLC 869527465.
- Roz Shafran; Sarah Egan; Tracey Wade; Peter J. Cooper (2010). Overcoming perfectionism: a self-help guide using cognitive behavioral techniques (1st ed.). London: Constable & Robinson. ISBN 978-1-84529-742-8. OCLC 646075750.

=== Articles ===
- Egan, Sarah; Johnson, Catherine; Wade, Tracey; Per Carlbring; Shravan Raghav; Roz Shafran (2024). "A pilot study of the perceptions and acceptability of guidance using artificial intelligence in internet cognitive behaviour therapy for perfectionism in young people". Internet interventions. 35 100711. doi:10.1016/j.invent.2024.100711. PMID 38313140. Wikidata Q129657635.
- Katherine Robinson; Egan, Sarah; Roz Shafran; Wade, Tracey (2024). "A randomised controlled evaluation of an online perfectionism intervention for people with disordered eating – how perfect does it need to be?". Cognitive Behaviour Therapy. 53 (3): 286–301. doi:10.1080/16506073.2024.2313739. PMID 38328877. Wikidata Q128355594.
- Brian CF Ching; Bennett, Sophie; Jessica, Nicola; Heyman, Isobel; Jessica L Schleider; Kate Fifield; Sophie Allen; Roz Shafran (2022). "Growth mindset in young people awaiting treatment in a paediatric mental health service: A mixed methods pilot of a digital single-session intervention". Clinical Child Psychology and Psychiatry: 135910452211051. doi:10.1177/13591045221105193. PMC 10018056. PMID 35642628. Wikidata Q113179874.
- Catanzano, Matteo; Bennett, Sophie; Ellie Kerry; et al. (2020). "Evaluation of a mental health drop-in centre offering brief transdiagnostic psychological assessment and treatment for children and adolescents with long-term physical conditions and their families: a single-arm, open, non-randomised trial". BMJ Mental Health. doi:10.1136/ebmental-2020-300197. PMC 7958088. PMID 33243761. Wikidata Q102998936.
- O'Connell, Jennifer; Helen Pote; Roz Shafran (2020). "Child mental health literacy training programmes for professionals in contact with children: A systematic review". Early Intervention in Psychiatry: the development, onset and treatment of emerging mental disorders. doi:10.1111/eip.12964. PMID 32342663. Wikidata Q93333468.
