= Isobel Heyman =

British psychiatrist

Isobel Heyman MBE FRCPsych
- Education: UCL Medical School
- Scientific career
- Workplaces: Great Ormond Street Hospital; Guy's and St Thomas' NHS Foundation Trust; University of Cambridge; Cambridge University Hospitals
- Thesis: Morphogenesis and differentiation of rhombomere boundaries (1995)

Isobel Heyman is a British psychiatrist and consultant in Cambridge and London. She is an Affiliated Professor at the University of Cambridge and a Professorial Fellow at Murray Edwards College. She serves as co-lead for the Cambridge Children's Hospital development project. She was named Royal College of Psychiatrists Psychiatrist of the Year in 2015.

== Early life and education ==
Heyman first studied pharmacology, before training in medicine at the UCL Medical School. She trained in psychiatry at the Maudsley Hospital. She earned a doctorate in developmental neurobiology at Guy's and St Thomas' NHS Foundation Trust, where she investigated rhombomere boundaries. In 1995, she returned to the Institute of Psychiatry, Psychology and Neuroscience, where she specialised in child and adolescent psychiatry.

== Research and career ==
In 1998, Heyman founded the first United Kingdom clinic for young people with obsessive–compulsive disorder. She was involved with the Tourette syndrome clinic and the Great Ormond Street Hospital (GOSH) epilepsy programme, where she pioneered research and clinical care for children with epilepsy who also had mental health needs.

One in five young people in the UK experience mental health disorders, and hospitals struggle with the demand for psychological services. In response, Heyman looked to provide young people already seeking medical care in hospital with a solution. The psychological medicine team she led at GOSH was recognised by the Child and Adolescent Mental Health Services for "The Lucy Project", a drop-in mental health booth that provided accessible, low-intensity early interventions for young people and their families who were concerned about mental health. The booth was named after Lucille "Lucy" van Pelt, the character from Peanuts. The booth was named The BMJ's Mental Health Team of the Year Award in 2021.

Heyman is passionate about integrating children's mental and physical health services. She is committed to integration across these domains and to enhancing delivery of effective mental health treatments to children. She was made co-lead for the Cambridge Children's Hospital development project.

== Awards and honours ==
- 2012 Times Best Children's Doctors
- 2015 Royal College of Psychiatrists Psychiatrist of the Year
- 2022 Member of the British Empire in New Year Honours

== Selected publications ==
- Bennett, Sophie D; Cross, J Helen; Chowdhury, Kashfia; Ford, Tamsin; Heyman, Isobel; Coughtrey, Anna E; Dalrymple, Emma; Byford, Sarah; Chorpita, Bruce; Fonagy, Peter; Moss-Morris, Rona; Reilly, Colin; Smith, Jonathan A; Stephenson, Terence; Varadkar, Sophia (30 March 2024). "Clinical effectiveness of the psychological therapy Mental Health Intervention for Children with Epilepsy in addition to usual care compared with assessment-enhanced usual care alone: a multicentre, randomised controlled clinical trial in the UK". The Lancet. 403 (10433): 1254–1266. doi:10.1016/s0140-6736(23)02791-5. ISSN 0140-6736. PMID 38461840.
- Brian CF Ching; Sophie D Bennett; Nicola Morant; Isobel Heyman; Jessica L Schleider; Kate Fifield; Sophie Allen; Roz Shafran (1 June 2022). "Growth mindset in young people awaiting treatment in a paediatric mental health service: A mixed methods pilot of a digital single-session intervention". Clinical Child Psychology and Psychiatry: 135910452211051. doi:10.1177/13591045221105193. ISSN 1359-1045. PMC 10018056. PMID 35642628. Wikidata Q113179874.
- Matteo Catanzano; Sophie D Bennett; Ellie Kerry; et al. (26 November 2020). "Evaluation of a mental health drop-in centre offering brief transdiagnostic psychological assessment and treatment for children and adolescents with long-term physical conditions and their families: a single-arm, open, non-randomised trial". BMJ Mental Health. doi:10.1136/ebmental-2020-300197. ISSN 1362-0347. PMC 7958088. PMID 33243761. Wikidata Q102998936.
- Katya Rubia; Anna B Smith; James Woolley; Chiara Nosarti; Isobel Heyman; Eric Taylor; Mick Brammer (1 December 2006). "Progressive increase of frontostriatal brain activation from childhood to adulthood during event-related tasks of cognitive control". Human Brain Mapping. 27 (12): 973–993. doi:10.1002/hbm.20237. ISSN 1065-9471. PMID 16683265. Wikidata Q48549469.
- I Heyman; E Fombonne; H Simmons; Tamsin Ford; H Meltzer; R Goodman (1 October 2001). "Prevalence of obsessive-compulsive disorder in the British nationwide survey of child mental health". British Journal of Psychiatry. 179: 324–329. doi:10.1192/bjp.179.4.324. ISSN 0007-1250. PMID 11581112. Wikidata Q51963265.
- Sharon Davies; Isobel Heyman; Robert Goodman (1 May 2003). "A population survey of mental health problems in children with epilepsy". Developmental Medicine & Child Neurology. 45 (5): 292–295. doi:10.1111/j.1469-8749.2003.tb00398.x. ISSN 0012-1622. PMID 12729141. Wikidata Q51948953.
