= Neil Kessel =

British psychiatrist (1925–2003)

William Ivor Neil Kessel (10 February 1925 – 30 December 2003) was a British psychiatrist with expertise in attempted suicide and alcoholism. He trained at the Maudsley Hospital under Sir Aubrey Lewis, before working with Michael Shepherd at the General Practice Unit. He moved to Edinburgh as part of G. M. Carstairs' unit on Psychiatric Epidemiology, and then on to the University of Manchester as a professor of Psychiatry where he was advisor on alcoholism to the Department of Health and Social Security (DHSS).

== Early life and education ==
Kessel was born on 10 February 1925, the only son of a General Practitioner in North London. He was educated at Highgate School, Trinity College, Cambridge, and University College Hospital (UCH). He was awarded Distinction in his Diploma in Psychological Medicine (DPM) (the standard psychiatric qualification at that time) by Sir Aubrey Lewis at the Maudsley Hospital in South London.

== Research ==
He conducted research with Michael Shepherd at the General Practice Research Unit at the Maudsley Hospital, where he contributed the concept of 'conspicuous psychiatric morbidity' - which describes the amount of psychiatric disorder known to a General Practitioner. He also conducted a study on neurotic disorder in general practice with Shepherd. In the early 1960s he moved to the University of Edinburgh as part of a research unit on the Epidemiology of Mental Disorders funded by the Medical Research Council (MRC) which later changed its name to the Unit on Psychiatric Epidemiology.

== Teaching and service development ==
In Manchester Neil Kessel developed the District General Hospital model of psychiatry, overseeing new buildings at Withington Hospital and Manchester Royal Infirmary, and leading on the teaching of medical students and post-graduate doctors. He became Dean of the Medical School at the University of Manchester. He appointed his fellow Maudsley trainee David Goldberg as Professor in Manchester.
