= David L. Streiner =

American-Canadian psychologist

- Born: David Lloyd Streiner; 12 November 1941 (age 84); Bronx, New York City, USA
- Known for: quantitative psychology

Academic background
- Education: City College of New York, Syracuse University

Academic work
- Institutions: McMaster University, University of Toronto

David L. Streiner (born 1941) is an American-Canadian psychologist, methodologist, and statistician who has researched health, quality of life, and quantitative psychology.

== Academic career ==
Streiner was born in the Bronx, New York and grew up there. He attended the City College of New York, earning a BA in Psychology, and then pursued graduate studies at Syracuse University, where he received an MSc followed by a PhD in clinical psychology in 1968. He subsequently moved to Canada and was appointed to the newly established medical school at McMaster University in Hamilton, Ontario, where he joined the Department of Psychiatry and Behavioural Neurosciences and provided statistical consulting to his colleagues.

After 30 years at McMaster he joined the Department of Psychiatry at the University of Toronto, where he established and directed the Applied Research Unit at the Baycrest Centre for Geriatric Care. He remained at Toronto for ten years and then returned to McMaster University to work part-time for another ten years. He eventually retired as Professor Emeritus in Health Research Methods, Evidence, and Impact and as Professor Emeritus in Psychiatry & Behavioural Neurosciences at the Faculty of Health Sciences.

== Research ==
Streiner developed extensive quantitative psychological and health research, publications on various measures of health status, and statistical manuals for health researchers. Among these publications are PDQ Statistics and PDQ Epidemiology, the latter co-authored with Geoffrey Norman. PDQ stands for "Pretty Darned Quick".

According to Google Scholar, his work has received over 80,000 citations and his h-index is 124. He also served as one of the founding editors of the journal Evidence-Based Mental Health.

== Publications ==
- Streiner, DL, Norman GR, & Cairney J (2024). Health Measurement Scales: a practical guide to their development and use. 5th edition. Oxford University Press.
- Norman, GR, & Streiner, DL. (2008). Biostatistics: the bare essentials. PMPH USA.
- Norman, GR, & Streiner, DL. (2008). PDQ Statistics. PMPH USA.
- Streiner, DL, & Norman, GR. (2009). PDQ Epidemiology. PMPH USA.

== Awards ==
- 2024: Gold Medal Award For Distinguished Lifetime Contributions to Canadian Psychology, Canadian Psychological Association
- 2022: Fellow of the Canadian Academy of Health Sciences
