= Veena Kumari =

Psychologist

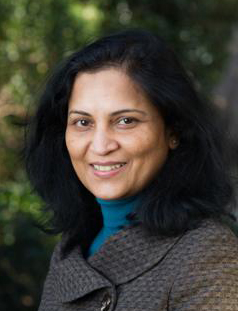
Veena Kumari

Veena Kumari is Professor of Psychology at Brunel University London.

== Education and career ==
Kumari completed a PhD in psychology in 1993, from Banaras Hindu University in India. She came to England as a postdoctoral researcher at the Institute of Psychiatry of King's College London, now the Institute of Psychiatry, Psychology and Neuroscience, and remained there, becoming a Full Professor in 2006. From 2016 to 2018 she worked in the US as Chief Scientific Officer for Southern California mental health provider Sovereign Health. In 2018, Kumari returned to England, taking up her present position as a Professor of Experimental Psychology and the Director of the Centre for Cognitive Neuroscience (CCN) at Brunel University London.

== Honors and awards ==
Before becoming a full Professor in 2006, she was a Beit Memorial Research Fellow in 1999, and a Wellcome Senior Fellow in Basic Biomedical Science in 2002. Her research has won many international awards, including the Young Investigator Award given by the National Alliance of Research on Schizophrenia and Depression in USA in 1999, the British Association of Psychopharmacology's Clinical Psychopharmacology Prize in 2002, and the prestigious Humboldt Research Award in 2014, as well as many fellowships.

== Selected publications ==
- Kumari, Veena; Postma, Peggy (2005). "Nicotine use in schizophrenia: the self medication hypotheses". Neuroscience & Biobehavioral Reviews. 29 (6): 1021–1034. doi:10.1016/j.neubiorev.2005.02.006. PMID 15964073. S2CID 15581894.
- Kumari, Veena; Gray, Jeffrey A.; Mitterschiffthaler, Martina T.; Das, Mrigen; Zachariah, Elizabeth; Vythelingum, Goparlen N.; Williams, Steven CR; Simmons, Andrew; Sharma, Tonmoy (2003). "Cognitive effects of nicotine in humans: an fMRI study". NeuroImage. 19 (3): 1002–1013. doi:10.1016/S1053-8119(03)00110-1. PMID 12880828. S2CID 917570.
- McAlonan, Grainne M.; Daly, Eileen; Kumari, Veena; Critchley, Hugo D.; Therese; Suckling, John; Simmons, Andrew; et al. (2002). "Brain anatomy and sensorimotor gating in Asperger's syndrome". Brain. 125 (7): 1594–1606. doi:10.1093/brain/awf150. PMID 12077008.
