= Monte B. Shapiro =

British psychologist

Monte Bernard Shapiro
- Born: May 31, 1912
- Died: April 29, 2000 (aged 87)
- Spouse: Jean Shapiro
- Children: David, Rose

Academic background
- Education: Rhodes University; University of Cambridge

Academic work
- Discipline: Clinical Psychology
- Institutions: Institute of Psychiatry

Monte Bernard Shapiro (May 31, 1912 – April 29, 2000) was one of the founding fathers of clinical psychology in the United Kingdom.

== Career ==
Shapiro was born in South Africa where he obtained his first degree in psychology from Rhodes University. He then moved to Britain where he undertook research at the University of Cambridge. With the outbreak of war, Shapiro joined the Royal Air Force and was shot down over the Netherlands leading to lifelong disability. After the war he started working at the Institute of Psychiatry where he established a training programme in clinical psychology along with Hans Eysenck at the Maudsley Hospital. He developed the scientist-practitioner model as the basis for training in clinical psychology. Although Shapiro and Eysenck worked together, they were at odds on various issues, including of note, the appointment of Stanley Rachman to their faculty.

== Research ==
Shapiro developed the use of the experimental method in the individual clinical case research. as a way to integrate psychological practice and a scientific approach. This approach was ultimately extended to current practice in neuropsychology. He developed the Personal Questionnaire (PQ) to measure psychological symptoms that were relevant to individuals (Shapiro, 1961).

== Recognition ==
The British Psychological Society identified Shapiro as one of the "influential clinicians" who created case formulation

In 1984, the British Psychological Society honoured Shapiro by creating the M.B. Shapiro Award, to honour a British psychologist each year who has achieved eminence in their contributions to the field. Shapiro was the first recipient of the award.

Earlier in his career, Shapiro's application to join the Experimental Psychological Society was declined. At no time in his career was Shapiro awarded a professorship.

== Publications ==
- Shapiro, M.B., Nelson, E.H. (1955). An Investigation of the Nature of Cognitive Impairment in Co-Operative Psychiatric Patients. British Journal of Medical Psychology.
- Shapiro, M. B.; Nelson, E. H. (1955). An investigation of an abnormality of cognitive function in a cooperative young psychotic: an example of the application of experimental method to the single case. Journal of Clinical Psychology, 11, 344-351.
- Bartlet, D., & and Shapiro, M.B. (1956). Investigation and Treatment of a Reading Disability in a Dull Child with Severe Psychiatric Disturbances, British Journal of Educational Psychology, 26 (3), 180–190.
- Shapiro, M.B., Post, F., Loefving, B., & Inglis, J. (1956). “Memory function” in psychiatric patients over sixty, some methodological and diagnostic implications. British Journal of Psychiatry.
- Shapiro, M.B., & Ravenette, A.T. (1959) - A preliminary experiment on paranoid delusions, The British Journal of Psychiatry, 1959.
- Shapiro, M.B. (1961). A method of measuring psychological changes specific to the individual psychiatric patient, British Journal of Medical Psychology, Volume 34, Issue 2, pages 151–155.
- Shapiro, M.B. (1961). The single case in fundamental clinical psychological research, British Journal of Medical Psychology.
- Shapiro, M.B., Marks, I.M., & Fox, B. (1963). A therapeutic experiment on phobic and affective symptoms in an individual psychiatric patient British Journal of Social and Clinical Psychology.
- Shapiro, M.B. (1964). The measurement of clinically relevant.variables. Journal of Psychosomatic Research, 8, 245–254
- Shapiro, M.B. (1966). The Single Case in Clinical-Psychological Research, Journal of General Psychology, Volume 74 (1).
- Shapiro, M.B. (1967). Clinical psychology as an applied science. British Journal of Psychiatry, 113, 1039–1042.
- Shapiro, M.B. (1969). A Clinically Orientated Strategy in Individual-Centred Research, British Journal of Social and Clinical Psychology, 8 (3), 290–291.
- Shapiro, M.B., Litman, G.K., Nias, D.K., & Hendry, E.R. (1973). A clinician's approach to experimental research, Journal of Clinical Psychology Volume 29 (2), 165–169.
- Shapiro, M.B. (1979). Assessment interviewing in clinical psychology. British Journal of Social and Clinical Psychology, Volume 18, Issue 2, pages 211–218.
- Shapiro, M.B. (1985). A reassessment of clinical psychology as an applied science. British Journal of Clinical Psychology, 24, 1–11.
