= Criminal Behaviour and Mental Health =

- Discipline: Criminology, psychiatry
- Language: English
- Edited by: Pamela Taylor, David P. Farrington, John Gunn, Mary McMurran

Publication details
- History: 1991–present
- Publisher: John Wiley & Sons
- Frequency: 5/year
- Impact factor: 1.929 (2020)

Standard abbreviations
- ISO 4: Crim. Behav. Ment. Health

Indexing
- CODEN: CBMHEE
- ISSN: 0957-9664 (print); 1471-2857 (web)
- LCCN: sn93038309
- OCLC no.: 24854273

Links
- Journal homepage; Online access; Online archive

Criminal Behaviour and Mental Health is a peer-reviewed scientific journal covering the relationship between criminal behavior and psychiatry. It was established in 1991 and is published five times per year by John Wiley & Sons. The editors-in-chief are Pamela Taylor (Cardiff University), David P. Farrington (Cambridge Institute of Criminology), John Gunn (Institute of Psychiatry, Psychology and Neuroscience), and Mary McMurran (University of Nottingham). According to the Journal Citation Reports, the journal has a 2020 impact factor of 1.929, ranking it 44th out of 69 journals in the category "Criminology & Penology", and 107th out of 144 journals in the category "Psychiatry (Social Science)".
