= Philip Asherson =

British psychiatrist

- Born: 20 August 1960 (age 66)
- Education: Royal London Hospital; University of Wales
- Known for: Research on genetics of attention deficit hyperactivity disorder
- Scientific career
- Fields: Psychiatric genetics
- Workplaces: Institute of Psychiatry, Psychology and Neuroscience
- Thesis: A genetic study of schizophrenia (1998)

Philip J. Asherson (born 20 August 1960) is Professor of Molecular Psychiatry at the MRC Social, Genetic and Developmental Psychiatry Centre at the Institute of Psychiatry, Psychology and Neuroscience, King's College London. He is known for his work on the genetics of ADHD in both adults and children.
