= Trudie Chalder =

British professor and researcher

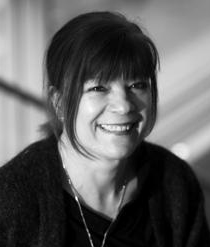
King's College portrait, 2013

Trudie Chalder is Professor of Cognitive Behavioural Psychotherapy at the Institute of Psychiatry in King's College London.

== Life ==
Chalder was president of the British Association for Behavioural and Cognitive Psychotherapies (BABCP) (2012-2014) and Director of the South London and Maudsley NHS Foundation Trust’s Persistent Physical Symptoms Service.

== Bibliography ==
=== Books ===
- Burgess, Mary; Chalder, Trudie (2005), Overcoming chronic fatigue : a self-help guide using cognitive behavioral techniques, Robinson, ISBN 9781841199429
- Chalder, Trudie; Hussain, Kaneez (2002), Self help for chronic fatigue syndrome : a guide for young people, Blue Stallion Publications, ISBN 9781904127017
- Chalder, Trudie (1995), Coping with chronic fatigue, Overcoming common problems, Sheldon, ISBN 9780859696852

=== Selected articles ===
- Chalder, Trudie, G. Berelowitz, Teresa Pawlikowska, Louise Watts, S. Wessely, D. Wright, and E. P. Wallace. "Development of a fatigue scale." Journal of Psychosomatic Research 37, no. 2 (1993): 147–153. doi:10.1016/0022-3999(93)90081-P
- Deale, Alicia, Trudie Chalder, Isaac Marks, and Simon Wessely. "Cognitive behavior therapy for chronic fatigue syndrome: a randomized controlled trial." American Journal of Psychiatry 154, no. 3 (1997): 408–414. pdf
- Wessely, Simon, Trudie Chalder, Steven Hirsch, Paul Wallace, and David Wright. "The prevalence and morbidity of chronic fatigue and chronic fatigue syndrome: a prospective primary care study." American Journal of Public Health 87, no. 9 (1997): 1449–1455. pdf
