= Adam S. Radomsky =

Canadian psychologist

Adam Scott Radomsky is a Canadian psychologist who studies obsessive–compulsive disorder (OCD) and related anxiety disorders. He is a professor in the Department of Psychology at Concordia University in Montreal, Canada, and was editor-in-chief of the Journal of Behavior Therapy and Experimental Psychiatry.

== Education and career ==
Radomsky received a BSc in psychology with a minor in philosophy from the University of Toronto in 1994. He attended the University of British Columbia for graduate studies, receiving a PhD in 2001 under the direction of Stanley Rachman. His thesis was titled An Experimental Analysis of Compulsive Ordering and Arranging. Upon graduation, he took a tenure-track position at the University of Concordia, where he was promoted to the rank of full professor in 2013.

Radomsky currently directs a research laboratory as well as a clinical practice, both focusing on the research and treatment of obsessive-compulsive disorder (OCD) and related anxiety disorders. His current research focuses on thoughts, beliefs and memory in OCD, and on new investigations of compulsive checking and contamination-based OCD. Radomsky became a co-editor of the Journal of Behavior Therapy and Experimental Psychiatry in 2012, and since 2016 has been editor-in-chief.

In 2014, Radomsky was elected fellow of the Canadian Psychological Association. He was the founding president of the Canadian Association of Cognitive and Behavioural Therapies (CACBT) in 2010 and was elected fellow in 2015.

== Selected works ==
- Rachman, S., Radomsky, A.S., & Shafran, S. (2008). "Safety behaviour: A reconsideration". Behaviour Research and Therapy, 46(2), 163–173.
- Radomsky, A.S., Ashbaugh, A.R., & Gelfand, L.A. (2007). "Relationships between anger, symptoms and cognitive factors in OCD checkers". Behaviour Research and Therapy, 45(11), 2712-2725
- Ashbaugh, A.R., Gelfand, L.A., & Radomsky, A.S. (2006). "Interpersonal aspects of responsibility and obsessive compulsive symptoms". Behavioural and Cognitive Psychotherapy, 34(2), 151–163.
- Coles, M.E., Radomsky, A.S., & Horng, B. (2006). "Exploring the boundaries of memory distrust from repeated checking: Increasing external validity and examining thresholds". Behaviour Research and Therapy, 44(7), 995–1006.
- Radomsky, A.S., Gilchrist, P.T., & Dussault, D. (2006). "Repeated checking really does cause memory distrust". Behaviour Research and Therapy, 44(2), 305–316.

== See also ==
- Cognitive behavioral therapy
