= Michael Rutter =

British child psychiatrist (1933 – 2021)

Professor Sir Michael Rutter CBE FRS FRCP FRCPsych FMedSci
- Born: Michael Llewellyn Rutter; 15 August 1933; Lebanon
- Died: 23 October 2021 (aged 88); Dulwich, London, UK
- Education: University of Birmingham Medical School
- Awards: Joseph Zubin Award (2003)
- Scientific career
- Fields: Child psychiatry
- Workplaces: Institute of Psychiatry, King's College London; Maudsley Hospital
- Thesis: Illness in parents and children (1963)
- Website: Official website

Sir Michael Llewellyn Rutter (15 August 1933 – 23 October 2021) was the first person to be appointed professor of child psychiatry in the United Kingdom. He has been described as the "father of child psychiatry".

Rutter was professor of developmental psychopathology at the Institute of Psychiatry, King's College London, and consultant psychiatrist at the Maudsley Hospital, a post he held from 1966 until retiring in July 2021. A survey published in Review of General Psychology in 2002 ranked Rutter as the 68th most cited psychologist of the 20th century.

== Early life ==
Rutter was the oldest child born to Winifred (née Barber) and Llewellyn Rutter. He was born in Lebanon where his father was a doctor, and was bilingual in English and Arabic by the age of 3. The family moved back to England when he was 4 years old. In 1940, at the age of 7, Rutter was evacuated, with his younger sister, to North America amid fears of a German invasion. They were sent to different households, and he had a much happier time than his sister Priscilla. They both returned to their family in 1944

== Education ==
Rutter attended the Moorestown Friends School in New Jersey, USA. Later he attended Wolverhampton Grammar School and then Bootham School in York. Here a physics teacher encouraged him to read works of Freud, and he trained himself to wake up and write down his dreams. This marked the beginning of his journey into psychology. He continued his studies at the University of Birmingham Medical School, originally intending to become a GP and join his father in his practice. However, he became more interested in the relationship between the brain, mind and neurosurgery, and went into post-graduate training in neurology and paediatrics.

He was mentored by Sir Aubrey Lewis at the Maudsley Hospital in South London, who guided him towards becoming a child psychiatrist. Rutter had not realised before this point that this was a profession that would suit him well.

== Career ==
Rutter set up the Medical Research Council (UK) Child Psychiatry Research Unit in 1984 and the Social, Genetic and Developmental Psychiatry Centre ten years later, being Honorary Director of both until October 1998. He was Deputy Chairman of the Wellcome Trust from 1999 to 2004, and was a Trustee of the Nuffield Foundation from 1992 to 2008.

Rutter's work includes: early epidemiological studies (Isle of Wight and Inner London); studies of autism involving a wide range of scientific techniques and disciplines, including DNA study and neuroimaging; links between research and practice; deprivation; influences of families and schools; genetics; reading disorders; biological and social, protective and risk factors; interactions of biological and social factors; stress; longitudinal as well as epidemiologic studies, including childhood and adult experiences and conditions; and continuities and discontinuities in normal and pathological development. The British Journal of Psychiatry credits him with a number of "breakthroughs" in these areas. Rutter is also recognized as contributing centrally to the establishment of child psychiatry as a medical and biopsychosocial specialty with a solid scientific base.

He published over 400 scientific papers and chapters and some 40 books. He was the European Editor for the Journal of Autism and Developmental Disorders between 1974 and 1994.

In 1972, Rutter published 'Maternal Deprivation Reassessed', which New Society describes as "a classic in the field of child care" in which he evaluated the maternal deprivation hypothesis propounded by Dr John Bowlby in 1951. Bowlby had proposed that "the infant and young child should experience a warm, intimate, and continuous relationship with his mother (or permanent mother substitute) in which both find satisfaction and enjoyment" and that not to do so may have significant and irreversible mental health consequences. This theory was both influential and controversial. Rutter made a significant contribution, his 1981 monograph and other papers (Rutter 1972; Rutter 1979) constituting the definitive empirical evaluation and update of Bowlby's early work on maternal deprivation. He amassed further evidence, addressed the many different underlying social and psychological mechanisms and showed that Bowlby was only partially right and often for the wrong reasons. Rutter highlighted the other forms of deprivation found in institutional care, the complexity of separation distress and suggested that anti-social behaviour was not linked to maternal deprivation as such but to family discord. The importance of these refinements of the maternal deprivation hypothesis was to reposition it as a "vulnerability factor" rather than a causative agent, with a number of varied influences determining which path a child will take.

After the end of Nicolae Ceauşescu's regime in Romania in 1989, Rutter led the English and Romanian Adoptees Study Team, following many of the orphans adopted into Western families into their teens in a series of substantial studies on the effects of early privation and deprivation across multiple domains affecting child development including attachment and the development of new relationships. The results yielded some reason for optimism.

In June 2014, Rutter was the guest on the BBC Radio 4 programme The Life Scientific, in which he described himself as a Nontheist Quaker, as well as revealing that, at the age of 80, he still worked each day "from about half past eight until about four".

Rutter was professor of developmental psychopathology at the Institute of Psychiatry, King's College London and consultant psychiatrist at the Maudsley Hospital, a post he held since 1966, until retiring in July 2021. A Review of General Psychology survey, published in 2002, ranked Rutter as the 68th most cited psychologist of the 20th century. He has been described as the "father of child psychology".

Rutter was the first to recognise the contributions that children themselves could make to the research into child psychology. Previously their voices had not been deemed as important, though he insisted that their viewpoints did matter and that they should be listened to.

== Attachment theory ==
Among Rutter's research topics was his extended interest in maternal attachment theory as studied in his 1974 book The Qualities of Mothering. In this book, Rutter studies the emergence of several disorders in growing children including antisocial personality disorder and affectionless psychopathology. Rutter's concentration is often reflected in his comments dealing with deprived learning environments and deprived emotional environment as these affect the child's growth. One of the principal distinctions which Rutter makes throughout his book titled The Qualities of Mothering is the difference between intellectual retardation in the child and the impairment of the emotional growth of the child as the non-development of healthy emotional growth.

== Awards and honours ==
Rutter had honorary degrees from the universities of Leiden, Amsterdam (University of Amsterdam UvA), Louvain, Birmingham, Edinburgh, Chicago, Minnesota, Ghent, Jyväskylä, Warwick, East Anglia, Cambridge and Yale.

Rutter was an honorary fellow of the British Academy and an elected Fellow of the Royal Society. He was a Founding Fellow of the Academia Europaea and the Academy of Medical Sciences and was knighted in the 1992 New Year Honours. The Michael Rutter Centre for Children and Adolescents, based at Maudsley Hospital, London, is named after him.

In 1983 he gave the annual Swarthmore Lecture to a large gathering of British Quakers, attending their Yearly Meeting, later published as A Measure of Our Values: goals and dilemmas in the upbringing of children.

In 2004 he was awarded the Society of Clinical Child and Adolescent Psychology Distinguished Career Award.

== Personal life and death ==
Rutter married Marjorie Heys, a nurse, on 27 December 1958. The couple had three children. His interests included fell walking, tennis, wine tasting and theatre. Rutter died at home in Dulwich, London on 23 October 2021, aged 88.

== See also ==
- Separation anxiety disorder
