= Journal of Behavior Therapy and Experimental Psychiatry =

Academic journal

- Discipline: Psychopathology
- Language: English
- Edited by: Adam S. Radomsky

Publication details
- History: 1970–present
- Publisher: Elsevier
- Frequency: Quarterly
- Impact factor: 2.189 (2018)

Standard abbreviations
- ISO 4: J. Behav. Ther. Exp. Psychiatry

Indexing
- CODEN: JBTEAB
- ISSN: 0005-7916 (print); 1873-7943 (web)
- LCCN: 79017538
- OCLC no.: 499957845

Links
- Journal homepage; Online access; Online archive

The Journal of Behavior Therapy and Experimental Psychiatry is a quarterly peer-reviewed scientific journal covering research on psychopathology, primarily from an experimental psychology perspective. It was established in 1970 and is published by Elsevier. Its founding editor-in-chief was Joseph Wolpe, who served as editor-in-chief from the journal's founding until his death in 1997. The current editor-in-chief is Adam S. Radomsky (Concordia University). According to the Journal Citation Reports, the journal has a 2018 impact factor of 2.189.
