= Arsime Demjaha =

Kosovo-born British psychiatrist and research scientist

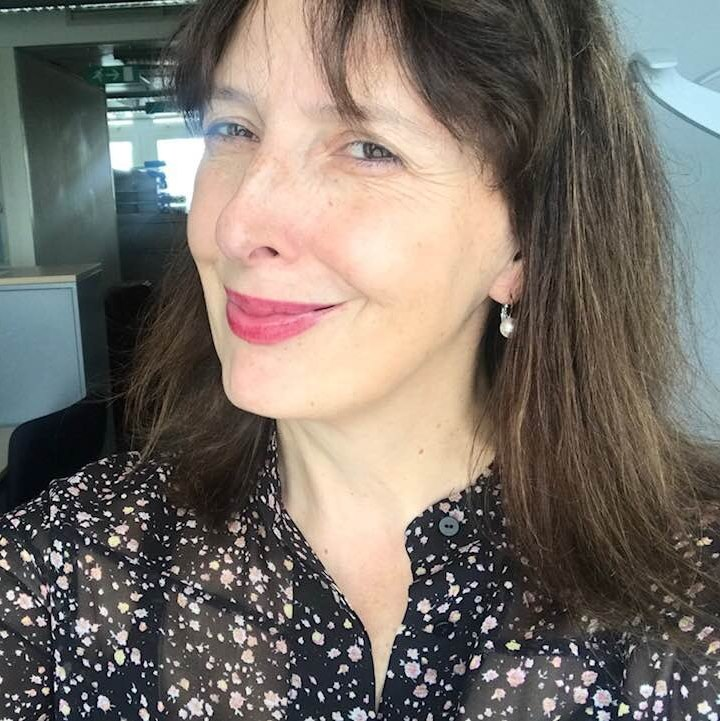
- Born: Pristina
- Education: King's College London, Institute of Psychiatry
- Awards: 2022: Best Article of the Year
- Scientific career
- Fields: Psychiatry, Schizophrenia, Negative Symptoms
- Workplaces: South London & Maudsley NHS Trust and King’s College London

Arsime Demjaha is a Kosovo-born British psychiatrist and research scientist who is an Honorary Clinical Lecturer at the Institute of Psychiatry, Psychology and Neuroscience (IOPPN), King's College London. Demjaha is known for her work in neurobiology of treatment resistant schizophrenia and treats patients with severe psychotic disorders at South London and Maudsley NHS Trust.

== Early life and career ==
Arsime Demjaha was born in Pristina, Kosovo and completed her early education in Pristina. In 1984, she was admitted at the Faculty of Medicine at the University of Pristina as a top applicant, having scored 100% in the admission exam. In 2001, she graduated in medicine at King's College London. Demjaha started her career at the Maudsley Hospital and IOPPN, as a clinical psychiatry trainee and later as an academic clinical lecturer. She received awards, NIHR BRC Preparatory Clinician Scientist Fellowship and the NIHR Academic Clinical Lectureship and completed her PhD alongside her clinical work. With her colleagues at IOPPN she produced findings that have been internationally recognized and featured on King's College News. She founded the first scientific data to suggest that patients with treatment resistant schizophrenia do not have dopaminergic abnormality, and that the majority of these patients do not respond to treatment from the initial phases of their illness. She has also won a Scholarship Award for Best Article in 2022 (Editors’ Choice). In 2016 Demjaha was involved in establishing and developing a new clinical service in Lambeth, South East London, designed to enable the moving on of patients from institutional care settings, which was shortlisted for National Third Sector Awards.

== Publications ==
- Demjaha, A., Galderisi, S., Glenthøj, B., Arango, C., Mucci, A., Lawrence, A., McGuire, P. (2023). "Negative symptoms in First-Episode Schizophrenia related to morphometric alterations in orbitofrontal and superior temporal cortex: The OPTiMiSE study." Psychological Medicine 53(8), 3471–3479. doi:10.1017/S0033291722000010
- Howe, A. J., & Demjaha, A. (2022). An Analytical Psychology Conceptualisation of Psychosis in Modern Psychiatry: Jung's Vision and
- Demjaha A. Invited commentary: On the brink of precision medicine for psychosis: Treating the patient, not the disease. Schizophr Res. http://dx.doi.org/10.1016/j.schres.2017.08.0
- Demjaha A, Egerton A, Murray R, Howes O, Stone J, McGuire P. Antipsychotic treatment resistance in schizophrenia associated with elevated glutamate levels but normal dopamine function Biol Psych. 2014;1;75(5):e11-3
- Demjaha A, Murray R, Mcguire P, Kapur S, Howes O. Dopamine Synthesis Capacity in Patients With Treatment-Resistant Schizophrenia. Am J Psychiatry. 2012:1;169 (11):1203–10.
