= Pamela Taylor =

British psychiatrist

Pamela Jane Taylor CBE, FRCPsych, FMedSci
- Born: 23 April 1948 (age 78)
- Scientific career
- Institutions: Cardiff University; King’s College London

Pamela Jane Taylor (born 23 April 1948) is a British psychiatrist and academic, who specialises in the links between psychosis and violence, and mental and physical health in the criminal justice system. Since 2004, she has been Professor of Forensic Psychiatry in the Department Institute of Psychological Medicine and Clinical Neurosciences of Cardiff University.

Having trained at Guy's Hospital, London, she has worked as an honorary consultant at Bethlem Royal Hospital (commonly known as Bedlam) and Maudsley Hospital from 1982 to 2005, at Broadmoor Hospital from 1995 to 2005, at Bro Morgannwg NHS Trust since 2004. She was Professor of Special Hospital Psychiatry at the Institute of Psychiatry, King's College London between 1995 and 2004. She was a joint-founder of the academic journal Criminal Behaviour and Mental Health, and has been its joint-editor since its foundation in 1991.

== Honours ==
In 1978, Taylor was awarded the Gaskell Medal and Prize by the Royal College of Psychiatrists; it is "one of the foremost academic distinctions in clinical psychiatry". In 1989, she was elected a Fellow of the Royal College of Psychiatrists (FRCPsych). In 2004, she was elected a Fellow of the Academy of Medical Sciences (FMedSci).

She was appointed Commander of the Order of the British Empire (CBE) in the 2017 Birthday Honours for services to forensic psychiatry.

== Selected works ==
- Gunn, John; Taylor, Pamela J., eds. (1993). Forensic Psychiatry: Clinical, Legal and Ethical Issues (1st ed.). Oxford: Butterworth-Heinemann. ISBN 978-0750603492.
- Gunn, John; Taylor, Pamela J., eds. (2010). Forensic Psychiatry: Clinical, Legal and Ethical Issues (2nd ed.). London: Hodder Arnold. ISBN 978-0340806289.
