= Khalida Ismail =

Medical researcher

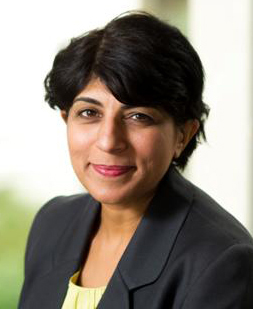
King's College portrait, 2013

Khalida Ismail is Professor of Psychiatry and Medicine at the Institute of Psychiatry, King's College London, specializing in diabetes and mental health. Ismail is an Honorary Consultant Liaison Psychiatrist at King's College Hospital NHS Foundation Trust.

Ismail researches into the epidemiology of the link between diabetes and depression and related disorders, along with evaluations of intervention methods. Her research has led to creation of 3 Dimensions of Care for Diabetes service (3DFD).

== Selected publications ==
- Winkley, Kirsty; Landau, Sabine; Eisler, Ivan; Ismail, Khalida (2006). "Psychological interventions to improve glycaemic control in patients with type 1 diabetes: systematic review and meta-analysis of randomised controlled trials". BMJ. 333 (7558): 65. doi:10.1136/bmj.38874.652569.55. PMC 1489251. PMID 16803942.
- Ismail, Khalida; Winkley, Kirsty; Rabe-Hesketh, Sophia (2004). "Systematic review and meta-analysis of randomised controlled trials of psychological interventions to improve glycaemic control in patients with type 2 diabetes". The Lancet. 363 (9421): 1589–1597. doi:10.1016/S0140-6736(04)16202-8. PMID 15145632.
- Unwin, Catherine; Blatchley, Nick; Coker, William; Ferry, Susan; Hotopf, Matthew; Hull, Lisa; Ismail, Khalida; Palmer, Ian; David, Anthony; Wessely, Simon (1999). "Health of UK servicemen who served in Persian Gulf War". The Lancet. 353 (9148): 169–178. doi:10.1016/S0140-6736(98)11338-7. PMID 9923871.
