= David Goldberg (psychiatrist) =

British social psychiatrist (1934–2024)

Sir David Paul Brandes Goldberg (28 January 1934 – 5 September 2024) was a British academic and social psychiatrist.

== Life and career ==
Goldberg was born to Jewish parents in Hampstead, London on 28 January 1934. He trained at the Maudsley Hospital in South London under Sir Aubrey Lewis and Sir Michael Shepherd. After nearly a quarter of a century as Professor at the University of Manchester, and head of the Department of Psychiatry, in 1993 Professor Goldberg returned to the Maudsley as both Director of Research and Development, and of Education, to run the Institute of Psychiatry at King's College London.

His prolific research output included the widely-adopted 'Clinical Interview Schedule' and 'General Health Questionnaire', validated tools for psychiatric research, and influential epidemiological work on psychiatric morbidity in the community. He was a long-term advisor to the World Health Organization. In 1996 he was knighted by Queen Elizabeth.

Goldberg retired in 2000, as a professor emeritus. He had four children and nine grandchildren, and he took up residence in south London. Goldberg died on 5 September 2024, at the age of 90.
