= Paul Salkovskis =

English clinical psychologist

- Citizenship: British
- Occupation: Clinical psychologist
- Awards: Aaron T. Beck Award (2006); MB Shapiro Award (2017)

Academic background
- Education: University of Reading; King's College London
- Influences: Monte B. Shapiro; Aaron T. Beck

Academic work
- Discipline: Clinical Psychologist
- Institutions: Oxford University; University of Bath; King's College London
- Main interests: Obsessive-compulsive disorder; Anxiety disorder; Panic; Health anxiety; Agoraphobia; Cognitive-behavioral therapy

Paul Martin Salkovskis is an English clinical psychologist. He has primarily worked on treating anxiety disorders, obsessive-compulsive disorder (OCD), panic, agoraphobia, and health anxiety. He is also considered a leading expert on cognitive-behavioral therapy (CBT).

From 2018 to 2020, Salkovskis served as the president of the British Association for Behavioural and Cognitive Psychotherapies.

== Early life ==
Salkovskis attended Kelso High School, earned his undergraduate degree at the University of Reading. He qualified as a clinical psychologist in 1979 at the Institute of Psychiatry of King's College London and the Maudsley Hospital. One of his teachers at the Institute was psychologist Monte Shapiro; according to Salkovskis, Shapiro was a "role model" for him.

He worked as a NHS clinical psychologist in Yorkshire for six years before accepting a position as a research clinical psychologist at the University of Oxford in 1985. He returned to the University of Reading, earning his Ph.D. there in 1990.

== Career ==
During his time at Oxford, Salkovskis was promoted Professor of Cognitive Psychology. In 2000, he left the position to serve as Professor of Clinical Psychology at the Institute of Psychiatry of King's College London. At King's College, he was also the Applied Science and Clinical Director of the Centre for Anxiety Disorders and Trauma, leading the SLaM NHS Trust program.

In 2010, he was appointed the Programme Director for the Clinical Psychology Doctorate Programme, a new program he created, at Bath University. During his career at Bath, Salkovskis set up a specialist NHS clinic for patients suffering from anxiety that did not respond to treatment. The clinic was funded by the Avon and Wiltshire Partnership NHS Trust.

In 2018, Salkovskis returned to Oxford, serving as the school's Professor of Clinical Psychology. He is currently the Director of the Oxford Centre for Psychological Health, the Oxford Institute of Clinical Psychology Training and Research, and the Oxford Cognitive Therapy Centre.

Salkovskis is an honorary fellow and former president of the British Association for Behavioural and Cognitive Psychotherapies (BABCP), as well as a fellow of the British Psychological Society. He was made an honorary fellow of the BABCP in 2014, and served as the organization's president from 2018 to 2020. He is currently the editor of the BABCP's academic journal Behavioural and Cognitive Psychotherapy.

During the COVID-19 pandemic, Salkovskis researched measures to help people curb COVID-related anxiety.

== Research ==
Salkovskis's research primarily involves treatment for anxiety disorders, obsessive-compulsive disorder (OCD), hoarding, panic, agoraphobia, and health anxiety. He is also considered a leading expert on cognitive-behavioral therapy (CBT), having worked with its creator, Aaron T. Beck. He has criticized OCD treatment and referral in Wales, stating, "The provision of specialist treatment in Wales for OCD is extremely poor."

He is also an expert in health psychology, researching topics such as health screening, health decision making, and identifying and treating psychological issues in both medically unexplained symptoms and long-term health conditions. He has discussed the increases in healthy anxiety and mental health issues during the COVID-19 pandemic.

== Recognition ==
In 2017, Salkovskis was awarded the MB Shapiro Award by the Division of Clinical Psychology of the British Psychological Society for his work in clinical psychology. He was previously a student of the award's namesake, Monte B. Shapiro, at the Institute of Psychiatry.
