= Levi Isaacs =

Tobacconist and Jewish lay leader

Levi Isaacs (c. 1860 – 30 October 1913) was a tobacconist and Jewish lay leader in Adelaide, South Australia and Melbourne, Victoria, Australia.

== History ==
Isaacs was born in Newcastle upon Tyne, the eldest son of itinerant jeweller Solomon Isaacs (c. 1830 – 30 August 1917) and his wife Pauline (c. 1830 – 14 July 1923), and came to South Australia with his parents and their family around 1865 and settled at 4 Tavistock Street, Adelaide. He was educated at the Pulteney Street School and at Adelaide Educational Institution. His father opened a jeweller's and watchmaker's shop in Rundle Street, where by 1875 Isaacs was being employed. By 1884 his father had a tobacconist's shop on Rundle Street east between Pulteney Street and Synagogue Place. He also ran a tailor's establishment.

Isaacs was a serious young man, and showed great interest in religion and literature. He became a leading lay member of Adelaide synagogue's congregation:

- committee member Jewish Benefit Society
- foundation member of the Adelaide Literary Society
- member of the first Union Parliament
- for seven years he was president of the Adelaide Hebrew Congregation
- founded the Adelaide Jewish Literary Society in 1891
- for four years honorary secretary of the Hebrew Sabbath School

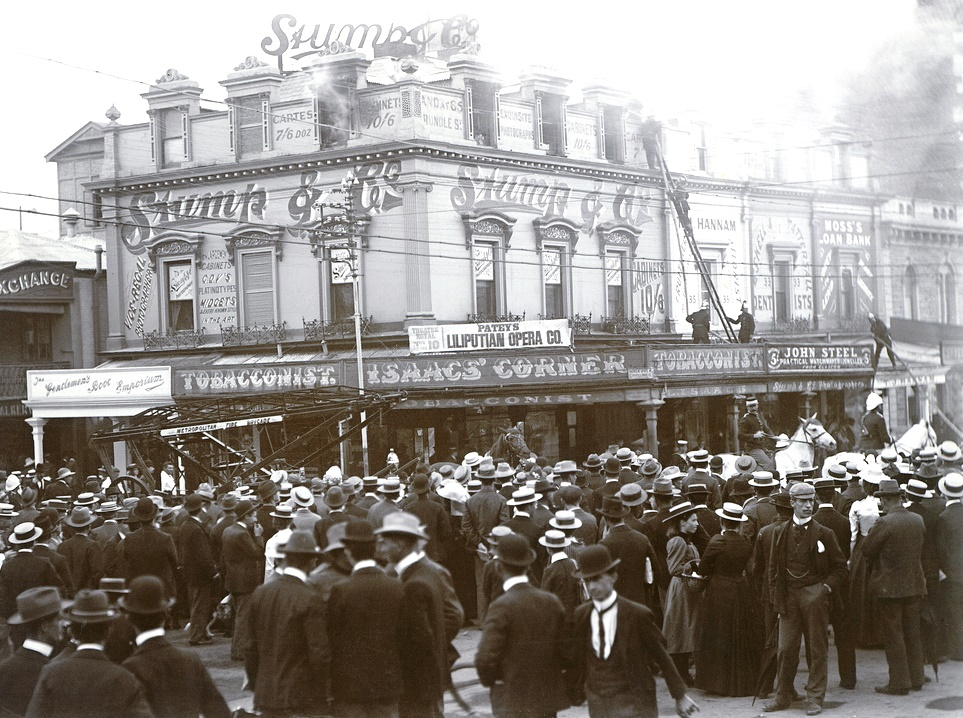
Fire at Stump's premises above Isaacs's shop, NW corner Hindley and King William streets, Adelaide

He travelled extensively throughout South Australia, particularly the north as far as Oodnadatta, where he founded a literary society. Isaacs ran the well-known tobacconist's business at "Isaacs' Corner" on the north corner of King William and Hindley streets 1891–1904, and was charter president of the South Australian Retail Tobacconists' Association 1894–1897. This was at a time when the retail tobacco shops were being used by many as a front for illegal "tote" bookmakers.

Citing health reasons, Isaacs left for Melbourne in May 1904, where his reputation had preceded him and was soon just as immersed in the Jewish community there as he had been in Adelaide. He took over John Lipshut's tobacconist's shop on the corner of Swanston and Little Collins streets. His son Eric took "The White Florist" shop next door. He became president of the Melbourne Hebrew Congregation, serving for three years, and was also president of the Melbourne Jewish Philanthropic Society, United Jewish Educational Board, and the Melbourne Tobacconists' Association. They had a home at 30 Jackson Street, St Kilda, where he died.

== Recognition ==
The northern corner of the Hindley Street – King William Street intersection was for years known as "Isaacs' Corner". It had been previously known as "Platt's Corner", then "Howell's Corner", and was also known as "Stump's Corner" for its dominating signs advertising the upstairs premises of photographer Alfred Stump, where one of Adelaide's many fires started in 1900.

== Family ==
Solomon Isaacs (c. 1830 – 30 August 1913) and his wife Pauline (c. 1830 – 14 July 1923), married at Sernas Golenz, Germany, on 6 October 1855, lived in Newcastle upon Tyne, emigrated to South Australia aboard Sophia around 1865 Their family included:

- Rosa Isaacs (c. 1856 – 28 April 1933) married Fishel Phillips (c. 1853 – 10 July 1930) on 21 May 1878
- Levi Isaacs (c. 1860 – 30 October 1913) married Annie Levi (c. 1862 – 10 April 1941) on 10 June 1891.

- Eric Isaacs (1893–1958) married (Pauline) Alma Solomon (8 December 1893 – ) on 5 January 1935, lived at 79 Wellington street, Windsor, Victoria. She was secretary, National Council of Jewish Women from its inception in 1927, and granddaughter of M. M. Perl.

- Gustav Isaacs (c. 1864 – 23 November 1943) married Katie Davis ( – ) on 24 February 1892. Katie was a daughter of John Davis of Fitzroy.
- Rachel "Ré" Isaacs ( – ) married George (Solomon) Lewis ( – 23 May 1931) on 16 August 1899. She was teacher at Adelaide Synagogue's Sabbath School for 12 years.

- Sir Aubrey Julian Lewis (8 November 1900 – 21 January 1975) Professor of Psychiatry

- Julia Isaacs ( – 10 December 1922) married David Davis ( – ) on 30 November 1904. Davis was the eldest son of S. Davis of Grote Street.
