= Katya Rubia =

British neuroscentist

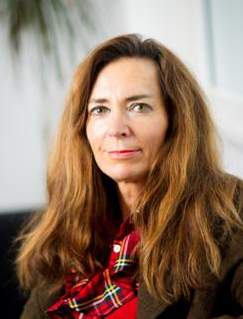
- Rubia in 2013
- Education: LMU Munich, PhD, 1994
- Scientific career
- Fields: Cognitive neuroscience
- Workplaces: Institute of Psychiatry, King's College London
- Thesis: (1994)
- Academic advisors: Ernst Pöppel, Yves von Cramon, Joseph Sergeant, Eric Taylor

Katya Rubia is a professor of Cognitive Neuroscience at the MRC Social, Genetic and Developmental Psychiatry Centre (SGDP Centre) and Department of Child and Adolescent Psychiatry, both part of the Institute of Psychiatry, King's College London.

She is best known for her work in child cognitive neuroscience and neuropsychiatry, particularly on disorders of impulsiveness, such as attention-deficit hyperactivity disorder, autism, obsessive-compulsive disorder, and conduct disorder. She uses techniques such as structural and functional magnetic resonance imaging (fMRI) and fMRI-neurofeedback.

== Education and profession ==
Katya Rubia received her BA in Philosophy and Psychology in 1987 at the Complutense University of Madrid, Spain. She obtained her PhD in neuropsychology (on the neuropsychology of timing functions in brain lesion patients) in 1994 at LMU Munich, Germany. She was a post-doc research assistant at the Technical University of Munich, in the Neurology Department and in Amsterdam, Netherlands at the University of Amsterdam. Since 1995, she has been working at King's College London, Institute of Psychiatry (Child Psychiatry Department) in London, England, where she became Professor in 2008. She teaches cognitive neuroscience, and is deputy head of department of the department of child & adolescent psychiatry and head of the section of developmental neuropsychology and neuroimaging.

== Research career ==
Some of Katya Rubia's early contributions to the field are that children with ADHD have difficulties with timing functions, which are closely associated with impulsiveness. Her main contribution to the field has been her work in neuroimaging of the disorder. She was a pioneer in imaging the brains of ADHD children in the 90s, which she carries on researching till today, and has substantially contributed to dispel the view that ADHD is a "myth" of naughty children by showing that ADHD is a neurodevelopmental disorder characterised by differences in brain chemistry, brain structure and brain function. She is also an international imaging expert in a range of other child and adult psychiatric disorders including autism, depression, schizophrenia, child abuse, obsessive-compulsive disorder and others with the aim to understand which brain differences are specific to ADHD and which are shared with other childhood disorders. Another line of research has been to investigate the effects of stimulant medication, the gold-standard treatment of ADHD, and of non-stimulant medications, on brain structure, function and chemistry in ADHD.

More recently, her research is focusing on the clinical application of neuroimaging to help with diagnosis and treatment. She has used machine learning techniques to test whether it is possible to diagnose ADHD patients based on structural and functional MRI scans. Another direction Professor Rubia has taken with neuroimaging is using fMRI-Neurofeedback to teach children to self-regulate those brain regions that her research has shown to be underfunctioning through a rocketeer video game that is connected to the brain activation of the patients. She also uses a range of brain stimulation techniques to modulate the brain regions that are not working well in ADHD patients. Her goal is to develop brain therapies that have longer-term neuroplastic effects that can help to reduce the symptoms of ADHD.

Katya Rubia has over 270 publications in academic journals., an h factor of 108 and sits on the editorial board of the journals of "Biological Psychiatry", "Biological Psychiatry: Cognitive Neuroscience and Neuroimaging" and "ADHD". She was awarded the prestigious European Kramer-Pollnow prize in 2013 for scientific excellence in clinical research in Biological Child and Adolescent Psychiatry and was elected in 2019 as Corresponding Foreign Member of the Royal National Academy of Medicine of Spain. Rubia is also a recipient of the 2019 and 2020 Highly Cited Researchers that recognises the world's most influential researchers of the past decade, demonstrated by the production of multiple highly cited papers that rank in the top 1% by citations for the field and year in Web of Science

== Other interests ==
Other interests are the research of the effects of meditation on brain function and structure. She has also studied how meditation could be used as a complementary and alternative medicine (CAM) treatment in children with ADHD.

In 2026, she featured in the Channel 4 documentary The Great ADHD Myth?, later stating that her words had been "cherry-picked" to support the programme's portrayal of ADHD as a myth and describing the programme as biased and irresponsible.
