= Michael Rutter Centre for Children and Adolescents =

Mental health service in London, England

Coordinates: 51.4698°N 0.0903°W

The Michael Rutter Centre for Children and Adolescents is based at the Maudsley Hospital, a psychiatric hospital run by the National Health Service NHS. Named after Sir Michael Rutter, it caters for children with mental health issues such as anorexia. In 1994 it was estimated that at least 10% of children with mental health problems required specialist facilities, but only 1-1.5% of children were being referred. (Garralda, M.E. 1994). Parry-Jones described Child Mental Health Services as the 'Cinderella Service' (Parry-Jones, W. 1992).

== See also ==
- Healthcare in London
