= Daniel Freeman (psychologist) =

British academic

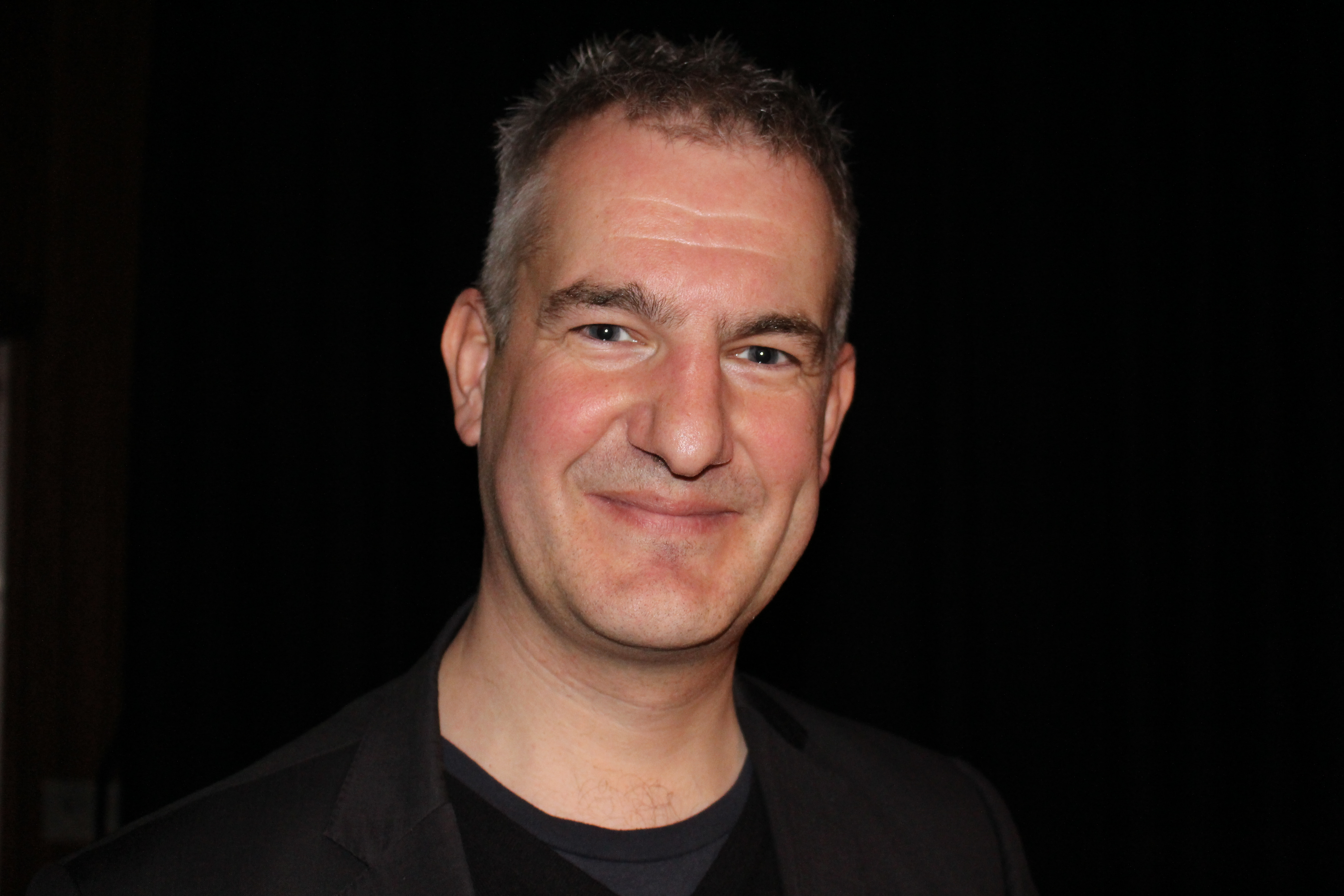
- Freeman at the Edinburgh International Science Festival 2014
- Known for: Paranoia studies
- Awards: May Davidson Award (2008)
- Scientific career
- Fields: Clinical psychology
- Workplaces: Institute of Psychiatry, Psychology and Neuroscience; University of Oxford

Daniel Freeman FBA is a British psychologist and paranoia expert at the Institute of Psychiatry, Psychology and Neuroscience at King's College London and professor of clinical psychology and National Institute for Health Research research professor in the Department of Psychiatry at University of Oxford. His research indicates that paranoia affects a much wider population, not just those who have schizophrenia, as previously thought. One of his studies has also suggested that virtual reality can help treat paranoia. He has written several books on paranoia and anxiety disorders.

In 2008, Freeman received the May Davidson Award from the British Psychological Society's Division of Clinical Psychology. On 22 July 2022, he was elected a Fellow of the British Academy (FBA), the United Kingdom's national academy for the humanities and social sciences.

In December 2018 Freeman presented the BBC Radio 4 series A History of Delusions.
