= Ann McNeill =

British academic/tobacco policy expert

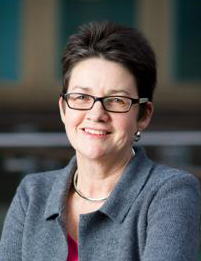
- King's College portrait photo, 2013
- Born: March 1, 1960 (age 66); United Kingdom
- Education: University of Nottingham
- Occupations: Academic, tobacco policy expert
- Employer: King's College London
- Known for: Tobacco addiction research, public health policy
- Title: Professor of Tobacco Addiction
- Website: King's College London Profile

Ann Denise McNeill CBE is a British academic and tobacco policy expert. She was a professor of Tobacco Addiction in the National Addictions Centre at the King's College London Institute of Psychiatry and deputy director of the UK Centre for Tobacco Control Studies.

McNeill has devoted her career to reducing the harmfulness of smoking to individuals and society and has worked in prevention, cessation and harm reduction, in particular how to reduce the health inequalities caused by smoking.

== Early life and education ==
Mc Neil graduated from the University of Nottingham with a 1st class joint honours degree in Psychology and Zoology, McNeill began her career in addictions research with a PhD in the development of dependence in adolescent smokers at the University of London.

== Career ==
McNeill worked in a quasi-governmental agency and as a freelance consultant whilst holding honorary academic positions at St George's Hospital Medical School and University College London.

In 2005, she was appointed Professor of Health and Policy Promotion in the Division of Epidemiology and Public Health at the University of Nottingham.

McNeill was the Professor of Tobacco Addiction in the National Addictions Centre at the King's College London Institute of Psychiatry and deputy director for tobacco of the UK Centre for Tobacco Control Studies.

== Policy influence ==
McNeill worked to develop and evaluate tobacco control policy, and chaired policy groups including the World Health Organization Europe Partnership Project Group to Reduce Tobacco Dependence (1999 - 2001) and the World Health Organization Scientific Advisory Committee on Tobacco Product Regulation (2000 - 2002). McNeill was also the Scientific Coordinator for the Analysis of the Science and Policy in Europe for the Control of Tobacco European Commission Project (2004 - 2006).

McNeill has been a member of the Royal College of Physicians Tobacco Advisory Group since 1998 and was a member of the National Institute of Health and Clinical Excellence: Harm Reduction Programme Development Group.

She was the chair for the Reference Group for the Independent Evaluation of the Responsibility Deal and Principal Investigator for the UK arm of the International Tobacco Control Policy Evaluation Project.

McNeill acted as Management Advisor of the SRNT/UICC Tobacco Treatment Database since its inception. McNeill is a Council member of Action on Smoking and Health and is a trustee of the Society for the Study of Addiction and of Tobacco Free Futures.

McNeill authored over 250 publications including original research, editorials and commentaries; she has co-authored books, and acted as editor or guest editor on journal supplements. McNeill is a senior editor of the journal Addiction.

She was the lead author of a 2015 report E - cigarettes: an Evidence Update commissioned by Public Health England. Among many other things, this concluded that e-cigarettes are around 95% less harmful than smoking.

== Honours and awards ==
In 1998, McNeill was awarded the World Health Organization World No Tobacco Day Tobacco Control medal.

In 2019, McNeill was recognised as key leading female figure and role model in the addictions field, discussing her life and influences in a short film made about her for the Society for the Study of Addiction.
