= Patrick Leman =

British psychologist

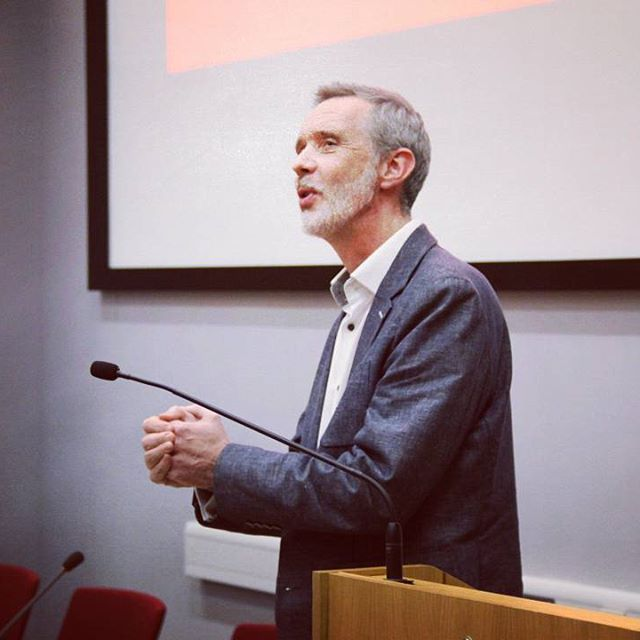
- Born: Walthamstow, London
- Citizenship: British
- Education: St Edmund Hall, Oxford; Corpus Christi College, Cambridge
- Scientific career
- Fields: Psychology
- Workplaces: Institute of Psychiatry, Psychology and Neuroscience at King's College London

Patrick Leman is a British psychologist and academic leader, currently Executive Dean of Health, Medicine and Life Sciences at Brunel University of London.

Previously, he was Executive Dean of Medicine and Health Sciences at University of Buckingham, and Dean of Education and Executive Dean at the Institute of Psychiatry, Psychology and Neuroscience at King's College London.

He has also held positions at Royal Holloway University of London, Goldsmiths College London, University of Waikato (New Zealand), and University of Cambridge. He was Chair of the British Psychological Society's Developmental Psychology Section, Editorial Advisory Group and Conference Committee. He is a Fellow of the British Psychological Society, and of the New Zealand Psychology Society, and a former editor of the British Journal of Developmental Psychology (2014-2019).

== Early life and education ==
Patrick Leman was born in Walthamstow and grew up in east London. He attended St. Mary's School (Walthamstow), Nightingale School (Wanstead) and Bancroft's School (Woodford Green).

He studied as an undergraduate in Psychology & Philosophy at St Edmund Hall, Oxford and a PhD in Developmental Psychology at Corpus Christi College, Cambridge.

== Career ==
=== Research ===
Leman's principal research concerns genetic epistemology and describes the ways in which children learn through communication with one another, often in informal, classroom contexts. His work explores the intersection of epistemic and social issues in developmental and social psychology, often from an experimental perspective. His early work on peer conversation with Gerard Duveen developed new methods for understanding children's co-construction of knowledge that has subsequently become a core area of research in European developmental psychology.

He has also examined the role of gender and ethnicity and race in children's social relationships contexts. Leman's work fuses social, developmental, cognitive and cultural psychology. More recent applied research has developed these theoretical ideas in classroom contexts to promote positive youth development including setting up, with colleagues, the White Water Writers charity. Leman is co-author, with Professor Andrew Bremner, of the popular text book "Developmental Psychology."

=== Academic leadership ===
Leman has held a number of academic leadership positions internationally, leading significant institutional change through innovation and creating partnerships. At King's College London, he set up the university's first undergraduate programmes in psychology and postgraduate programmes through King's Online. At Waikato in New Zealand. he helped to set the te Pae Kokako opera programme and led teams in Shanghai and Hangzhou in China. He led the University of Buckingham's Medical School in its 10th anniversary celebrations. He is extensively involved in the leadership of health and medical schools across London and the south east of England.

== Personal life ==
Patrick Leman is married with four children and currently lives in south east England. He is a lifelong supporter of Leyton Orient Football Club.
