= Stanley Rachman =

Canadian psychologist (1934–2021)

- Born: January 19, 1934; Johannesburg, South Africa
- Died: September 2, 2021 (aged 87)
- Other name: Jack Durac
- Occupation: Clinical Psychologist

Academic background
- Education: University of Witwatersrand; King's College, London
- Influences: Joseph Wolpe; Hans Eysenck

Academic work
- Institutions: Institute of Psychiatry; University of British Columbia
- Main interests: Obsessive–compulsive disorder; anxiety disorders
- Influenced: Paul Salkovskis; Adam Radomsky

Stanley "Jack" Rachman (January 19, 1934 – September 2, 2021) was a South African–born Canadian psychologist who worked primarily with obsessive–compulsive disorder (OCD) and other anxiety disorders. He facilitated some of the earliest studies for treatment of OCD and other anxiety disorders and influenced several other psychologists, including Adam Radomsky and Paul Salkovskis. He was also a founding editor of the journal Behaviour Research and Therapy, alongside Hans Eysenck.

Rachman also wrote under the pseudonym "Jack Durac".

== Early life ==
Rachman was born on January 19, 1934, in Johannesburg, South Africa. He was first introduced to clinical psychology when he heard a lecture from psychologist Joseph Wolpe. Rachman introduced himself to Wolpe, who soon became his mentor.

Rachman completed his undergraduate degree at the University of Witwatersrand, before taking a lectureship there. At 22 years old, he was the youngest lecturer at the university. In 1961, Rachman completed his Ph.D. at the Institute of Psychiatry at King's College, London, under the supervision of psychologist Hans Eysenck.

== Career ==
During his time at the Institute of Psychiatry, Rachman facilitated some of the earliest studies researching exposure and response prevention as a potential treatment for obsessive–compulsive disorder (OCD). He also developed a clinical psychology training course at the Institute; the course was the first of its kind in England.

In 1963, he and Hans Eysenck founded the journal Behaviour Research and Therapy, after securing funding from Robert Maxwell. He served as the journal's second Editor-in-Chief, after Eysenck, until 2002. He and Eysenck wrote the influential book The Causes and Cures of Neurosis in 1965.

In his career, Rachman worked primarily with obsessive–compulsive disorder (OCD) and other anxiety disorders. Rachman served on multiple editorial boards. He has published books and hundreds of articles on obsessive–compulsive disorder and other anxiety disorders, recently proposing new cognitive models and treatments for obsessions and compulsive checking, as well as proposing a revised conceptualization of the fear of contamination.

Rachman was Emeritus Professor of Psychology at the Institute of Psychiatry, King's College London. In 1982, he moved to the University of British Columbia in Vancouver, British Columbia. He became Professor Emeritus of its Department of Psychology. He was also a Fellow of the Royal Society of Canada.

== Recognition ==
Rachman received the Lifetime Achievement Award from the British Psychological Society in 2009, as well as an award from the American Psychological Association, Division 12, in 1982. In 1988, he also received the Killam Award. The Canadian Council of Professional Psychology Programs also issued the Award for Excellence in Professional Training to Rachman in 2002.

== Personal life ==
Stanley Rachman met his wife, Clare Philips, during his time at the Institute of Psychiatry. He moved with Philips to her home country, Canada, in 1982. He is the father of author Tom Rachman and journalist Gideon Rachman.

Rachman used the pseudonym "Jack Durac" to write several publications, including joke articles in Behaviour Research and Therapy, as well as a wine book titled A Matter of Taste. He claimed that he received more funds from the latter book than any of his psychology work.

== See also ==
- Cognitive behavioral therapy
- Obsessive–compulsive disorder
- Hans Eysenck
