= Behaviour Research and Therapy =

- Subject: Behavior therapy
- Language: English
- Edited by: Allison Waters

Publication details
- History: 1963–present
- Publisher: Elsevier
- Frequency: Monthly
- Impact factor: 4.5 (2024)

Standard abbreviations
- ISO 4: Behav. Res. Ther.

Indexing
- CODEN: BRTHAA
- ISSN: 0005-7967 (print); 1873-622X (web)
- LCCN: 68006784
- OCLC no.: 780558717

Links
- Journal homepage; Online archive

Behaviour Research and Therapy is a monthly peer-reviewed scientific journal covering behavior therapy. It was established by Hans Eysenck and Stanley Rachman in 1963 as the world's first journal dedicated to behavior therapy. It is published by Elsevier and the editor-in-chief is Allison Waters, PhD (Griffith University). According to the Journal Citation Reports, the journal has a 2024 impact factor of 4.5.
