= Jessica Schleider =

American clinical psychologist, author

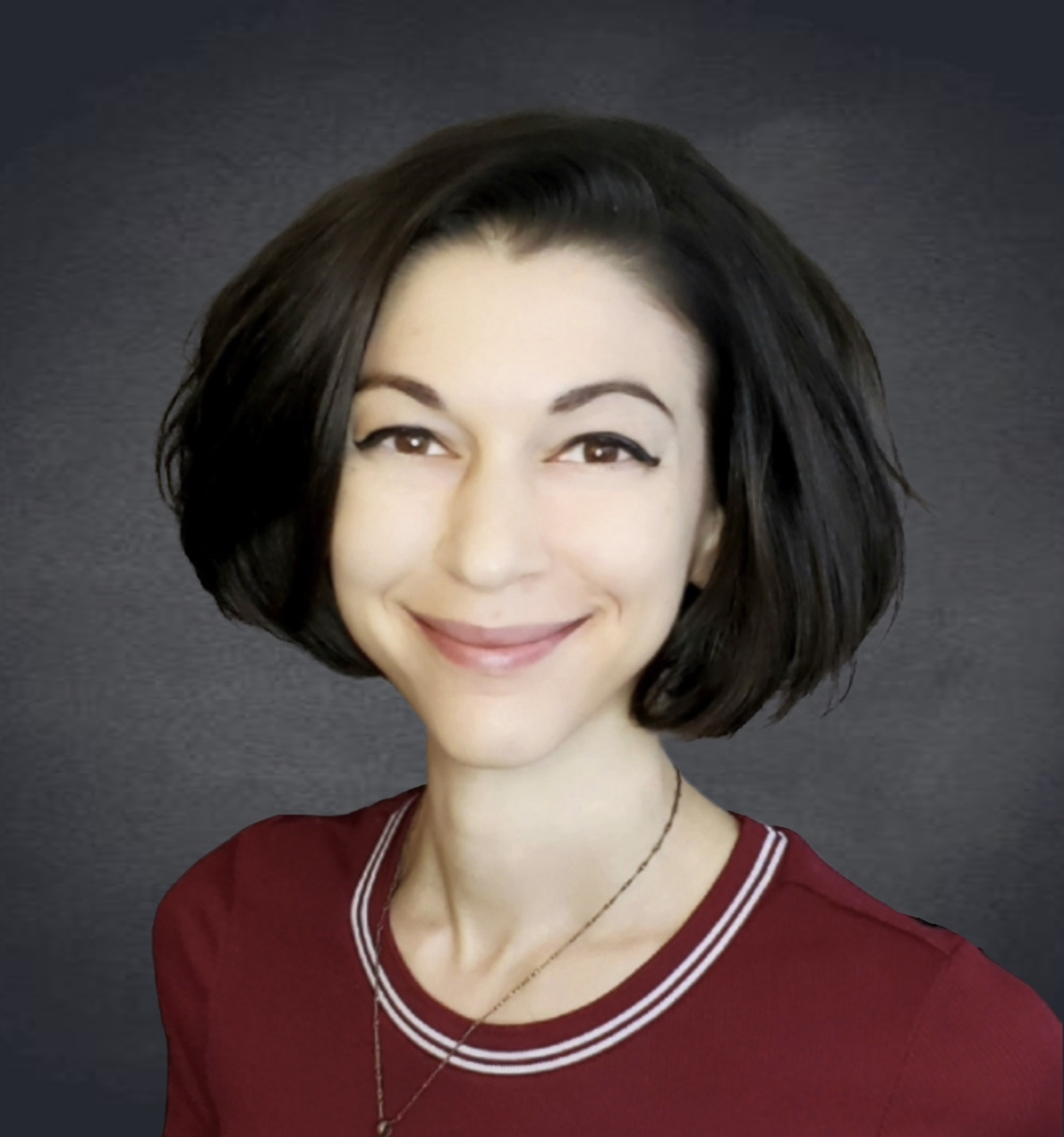

Jessica Schleider is an American psychologist, author, and an associate professor of Medical Social Sciences at Northwestern University. She is the lab director of the Lab for Scalable Mental Health.

== Education and degrees ==
Schleider began her academic career at Swarthmore College, working with psychology professor Jane Gillham, Ph.D., as her thesis advisor. In 2011, Schleider received the Wallach Fellowship for her thesis; she continued work on it with Gillham after graduation, resulting in a publication in Current Psychiatry Reviews. She graduated from Swarthmore College in 2012 with a Bachelor of Arts in psychology, next pursuing a master's degree at Harvard University working with psychologist John R. Weisz as her advisor. During her time as a masters student, she received the Stimson Fund Research Grant in 2012, the William H. Talley Award in 2013–2014, and the Karen Stone Fellowship in 2013–2014. With the grant and the award, she completed publications as a co-author with Weisz in the Journal of Abnormal Child Psychology and the Child Psychiatry and Human Development Journal. In 2014, Schleider received her Master of Arts in psychology. In 2018, she completed her final steps of education with a doctoral internship in clinical and community psychology on a track of consultation, prevention, and program evaluation services at Yale University School of Medicine and finally her Ph.D. in clinical psychology at Harvard University.

== Positions and roles ==
Associate professor of medical social sciences, pediatrics, and psychology at Northwestern University

Founding director, Lab for Scalable Mental Health.

== Research ==
Schleider's research focuses on the development, evaluation, and dissemination of brief (single-session, under 30 minutes) interventions for children and adolescents experiencing mental health difficulties. The goal of developing these single-session interventions (SSIs) is to increase the availability and accessibility of effective evidence-based interventions, particularly for underserved groups (e.g. LGBTQ+ and youth of Color). Schleider leads the Lab for Scalable Mental Health, where these interventions are designed and evaluated. Her research aims to evaluate the effectiveness of the interventions (whether they work) and the mechanisms of change (how and why they work). Many of Schleider's brief interventions target symptoms of anxiety and depression among adolescents (ages 11–17). She has also developed SSIs that help parents learn to support their child's mental health treatment. Schleider has made many of her interventions publicly available as part of her commitment to open science practices. Over the course of her career, Schleider's team has now reached an estimated 50,000 individuals through single session interventions.

== Honors and awards ==
Jessica Schleider awards and honors
Award	Year
Rising Star Award, International Society for Research on Internet Interventions	2022
Implementation Research Institute Fellow, National Institute of Mental Health	2022–24
Susan Nolen-Hoeksema Early Career Research Award, Society for a Science of Clinical Psychology, Division 12, American Psychological Association	2022
Digital Innovation Award (Highly Commended), Association of Child and Adolescent Mental Health	2021
Richard “Dick” Abidin Early Career Award, Society for Clinical Child and Adolescent Psychology, Division 53, American Psychological Association	2021
Forbes 30 Under 30 in Healthcare, Forbes Magazine	2020
National Institutes of Health (NIH) Director's Early Independence Award, NIH	2019
President's New Researcher Award, Association for Behavioral and Cognitive Therapies	2019
Journal of Child Psychology and Psychiatry (JCPP) Best Paper Award, Association of Child and Adolescent Mental Health.	2019
Outstanding Student Researcher Award, Society for a Science of Clinical Psychology, Division 12, American Psychological Association	2017
Anne Anastasi General Psychology Graduate Student Research Award, Society for General Psychology, Division 1, American Psychological Association	2017
Career Development Leadership Award, Anxiety & Depression Association of America	2017
Derek C. Bok Certificate of Distinction in Teaching, Harvard University	2016
Student Achievement Award, Society for Clinical Child and Adolescent Psychology, Division 53, American Psychological Association	2016
Delaware Project Student Award (Honorable Mention), The Delaware Project	2016
Individual National Research Service Award, National Institute of Mental Health	2015
Travel Scholarship, International Society for Research in Child/Adolescent Psychopathology	2015
Restricted Funds Conference Grants (x5), Harvard University	2013–17

== Selected publications ==
Schleider has published more than 80 scientific articles and book chapters. She has created or co-created six open-access, single-session mental health programs, which have served over 14,000 teens and adults. She has written a self-help workbook, titled "The Growth Mindset Workbook for Teens" and co-edited the Oxford Guide to Brief and Low-Intensity Interventions for Children and Young People.

- Schleider, J.L., Mullarkey, M.C., Fox, K.R., Dobias, M.L., Shroff, A., Hart, E.A., Roulston, C. (2022). A Randomized Trial of Online Single-Session Interventions for Adolescent Depression during COVID-19. Nature Human Behavior, 6, 258–268. doi: 10.1080/15374416.2019.1683852.
- Schleider, J.L. (2022). Repairing the Research-Service Rupture in Clinical Psychological Science. Nature Reviews Psychology, 1, 2–4. DOI:10.1038/s44159-021-0005-z.
- Dobias, M.L., Morris, R., Schleider, J.L. (2022). Single-session interventions embedded within Tumblr: A test of acceptability and utility. JMIR Formative Research, 6(7), e39004. DOI:10.2196/39004.
- Schleider, J.L., Dobias, M.L., Mullarkey, M.C., Ollendick, T. (2021). Retiring, Rethinking, and Reconstructing the Norm of Once-Weekly Psychotherapy. Administration and Policy in Mental Health and Mental Health Services Research, 48, 4–8. DOI:10.1007/s10488-020-01090-7.
- Sung, J.Y., Mumper, E., Schleider J.L. (2021). Empowering Parents to Manage Child Avoidance Behaviors: Randomized Trial of a Single-Session Intervention Targeting Parent Accommodation. Journal of Medical Internet Research: Mental Health, 8(7), e29538. DOI:10.2196/preprints.29538
- Schleider, J.L., Dobias, M.L., Sung, J.Y., Mullarkey M.C. (2020). Future directions in single-session youth mental health interventions. Journal of Clinical Child and Adolescent Psychology, 2, 264–278. DOI:10.1007/s10488-021-01146-2
- Schleider, J.L., Dobias, M.L., Sung J.Y., Mumper, E., Mullarkey, M.C. (2020). Acceptability and utility of an open-access, online single-session intervention platform for adolescent mental health. Journal of Medical Internet Research: Mental Health, 7, e2013. DOI:10.2196/20513
- Schleider, J. L., & Weisz, J. (2017). A single-session growth mindset intervention for adolescent anxiety and depression: 9-month outcomes of a randomized trial. Journal of Child Psychology and Psychiatry, 59(2), 160–170. DOI:10.1111/jcpp.12811
- Schleider, J. L., & Weisz, J. R. (2017). Little treatments, promising effects? Meta-analysis of single-session interventions for youth psychiatric problems. Journal of the American Academy of Child & Adolescent Psychiatry, 56(2), 107–115. DOI:10.1016/j.jaac.2016.11.007
- Schleider, J. L., & Weisz, J. R. (2016). Reducing risk for anxiety and depression in adolescents: Effects of a single-session intervention teaching that personality can change. Behavior Research and Therapy, 87, 170–181. DOI:10.1016/j.brat.2016.09.011
