= Janet Treasure =

British psychiatrist

Professor Janet Treasure OBE FRCP FRCPsych
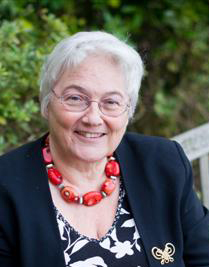
- Treasure in 2013.

Professor of Psychiatry, Institute of Psychiatry

Personal details
- Born: 1952 (age 73–74)

Janet Treasure (born 1952) is a British psychiatrist, who specialises in research and treatment of eating disorders.

She is currently the Director of the Eating Disorder Unit and Professor of Psychiatry at the Institute of Psychiatry, King's College, London. In early-2013, she was awarded Officer of the Order of the British Empire (OBE) for Services to People with Eating Disorders.

== Academic career ==
Treasure began her medical and academic careers at the University of London in 1970, gaining her Bachelor of Science in Physiology (BSc; 1st Class) in 1973, her doctorate in Physiology (PhD) in 1975 and her Bachelor of Medicine, Bachelor of Surgery (MB, BS) in 1978. She then joined the Royal College of Physicians (MRCP) in 1980, and the Royal College of Psychiatrists (MRCPsych) in 1984. In 1995 she was awarded a fellowship of the Royal College of Psychiatrists (FRCPsych), and in 1999 a fellowship of the Royal College of Physicians (FRCP).

== Employment history ==
Janet became a Medical Research Council (MRC) training fellow at the Institute of Psychiatry, King's College London, in 1984. Three years later in 1987 she became a lecturer in Psychiatry, and in 1989 she was made senior lecturer jointly with KCL and the South London and Maudsley NHS Foundation Trust(SLaM). She was awarded a professorship in Psychiatry at KCL in 2000, which she continues to hold today, alongside her position as director of the Eating Disorder Unit in SLaM.

=== Other positions held ===
Treasure holds, or has held, the following posts:

- Chief medical advisor for Beat, the UK’s primary eating disorder charity
- Patron of the Sheffield Eating Disorders Association
- Fellow of Academy of Eating Disorders
- Former chair for the physical treatment section of the UK National Institute for Health and Clinical Excellence (NICE) Guideline Committee
- Scientific Committee Member NEVER GIVE UP no-profit association for beating Eating Disorders www.never-give-up.it

== Research background ==
Treasure is a specialist in the treatment of eating disorders, having made great headway in both research and treatment, and publishing around 300 peer-reviewed research articles. Her research mainly focusses on the relationship between disorder behaviour and the brain, with the overall aim of developing new treatments. This work has been carried out with patient input, often inspired by patients and their families, whilst also working with various international teams. Her current research unit is investigating and developing all aspects of eating disorders treatment, biology, and clinical problems. She has previously been a co-coordinator of a multicentre European-wide study that examined the genetic and environmental factors associated with the management of eating disorders, and was also vice-chairman of a European project examining the effectiveness of treatment of eating disorders in over 20 countries.

=== Diabetes research ===
Treasure has also been very involved in cognitive behavioural therapy (CBT) and motivational interviewing treatment trials for patients with type 1 diabetes.

== Publications ==
=== Books ===
Treasure is the author and editor of several textbooks on eating disorders: Neurobiology in the Treatment of Eating Disorders, Ed Hoek K, Treasure J, Katzman M (1997) and Handbook on Eating Disorders, Szmukler G, Dare C & Treasure (1995) (edition 1 &2) Wiley and, Owen, Treasure & Collier (2001) Animal Models of Eating behaviour and body composition, Kluwer Academic Publishers, The Netherlands. She has also written numerous self-help books for patients with eating disorders, including Getting better bite by bite for patients with bulimia nervosa and Anorexia nervosa; a survival guide for families, friends and sufferers for parents, teachers and patients about anorexia nervosa.

=== Journal articles ===
Treasure is the author of around 300 peer-reviewed journal articles.

== Honours and awards ==
In 1984, Treasure was awarded the Gaskell medal from the Royal College of Psychiatrists. In 2004 she was honoured to be awarded the Academy for Eating Disorders (AED) Leadership Award in Research, which honours individuals who have developed new knowledge regarding eating disorders through research over the course of 10 years or more, with a significant and measurable impact on the field. This must have been done either by making strides in the development of the understanding of eating disorder aetiologies, by developing treatments or developing new lines of research. This is an internationally acknowledged and respected award. In 2007, the national eating disorder charity Beat awarded Professor Treasure the Eating Disorders National Award.

She was elected a Fellow of the Academy of Medical Sciences in 2022.
