= Cognitive Behaviour Therapy (journal) =

Quarterly peer-reviewed medical journal

- Discipline: Cognitive psychology, clinical psychology, psychotherapy
- Language: English
- Edited by: Per Carlbring, Mark Powers

Publication details
- Former name: Scandinavian Journal of Behaviour Therapy
- History: 1972-present
- Publisher: Taylor & Francis
- Frequency: Quarterly
- Impact factor: 4.41 (2019)

Standard abbreviations
- ISO 4: Cogn. Behav. Ther.

Indexing
- CODEN: CBTOAW
- ISSN: 1650-6073 (print); 1651-2316 (web)
- OCLC no.: 629698221

Links
- Journal homepage; Online access; Online archive

Cognitive Behaviour Therapy is a quarterly peer-reviewed medical journal covering the application of cognitive science to the psychological study of behavior therapy. It was established in 1972 as the Scandinavian Journal of Behaviour Therapy, obtaining its current name in 2002. It is published by Taylor & Francis on behalf of the Swedish Association of Behavioural Therapists, of which it is the official journal. The editor-in-chief of the European office is Per Carlbring (Stockholm University) and that of the North American office is Mark Powers (University of Texas at Austin). In 2019 the journal had an impact factor of 4.41.
