= Child Psychiatry & Human Development =

- Discipline: Child psychiatry Developmental psychology
- Language: English
- Edited by: Eric Storch

Publication details
- History: 1970–present
- Publisher: Springer Science+Business Media
- Frequency: Bimonthly
- Impact factor: 2.9 (2022)

Standard abbreviations
- ISO 4: Child Psychiatry Hum. Dev.

Indexing
- CODEN: CPHDA3
- ISSN: 0009-398X (print); 1573-3327 (web)
- LCCN: 72621000
- OCLC no.: 605114238

Links
- Journal homepage; Online archive

Child Psychiatry & Human Development is a bimonthly peer-reviewed scientific journal covering developmental psychology and child psychiatry, with an emphasis on issues related to clinical disorders in children, adolescents, and families. It was established in 1970, and is published by Springer Science+Business Media. The editor-in-chief is Eric A. Storch (Baylor College of Medicine). According to the Journal Citation Reports, the journal has a 2022 impact factor of 2.9.
