= British Association for Behavioural and Cognitive Psychotherapies =

British Association for Cognitive and Behavioural Psychotherapies
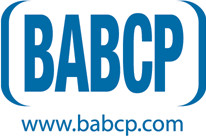
- Formation: 1972
- Type: professional association
- President: Dr Saiqa Naz
- Key people: Dr Stirling Moorey President Elect; Tommy McIlravey CEO
- Website: www.babcp.com

The British Association for Behavioural and Cognitive Psychotherapies (BABCP) is a Britain-based multi-disciplinary interest group for people involved in the practice and theory of cognitive behaviour therapy.

== History ==
Initially founded as the British Association for Behavioural Psychotherapy in 1972 by a small group including Isaac Marks, the organisation changed name in 1992 to incorporate cognitive therapies.

== Organisation aims and activity ==
Based in Bury, the BABCP works to promote cognitive behavioral psychotherapies, disseminate information, set standards, and support local interest groups. An annual conference has been held in July every year since 1975, with additional training seminars. The peer reviewed journal Behavioural and Cognitive Psychotherapy, with Paul M. Salkovskis as the current Editor-in-Chief, is free to members. Members can also apply for accreditation as CBT practitioners, with the qualification used as a formal recognition of CBT training and as guidance in a United Kingdom government initiative to improve access to psychological treatments (Improving Access to Psychological Therapies).

== Executive group and membership ==
The organisation is supported by a BABCP Board of Directors (President, Honorary Secretary, Treasurer, approximately six elected members), 14 National Committee Forum staff and office management staff. As of the end of 2011 there were 9,600 members.

== See also ==
- Mental health in the United Kingdom
