= Aubrey Lewis =

American psychiatrist (1900–1975)

- Born: Aubrey Julian Lewis; 8 November 1900; Adelaide, Australia
- Died: 21 January 1975 (aged 74); London, England
- Education: Christian Brothers College, Adelaide; University of Adelaide
- Occupation: Psychiatrist
- Known for: Being the first Professor of Psychiatry at the Institute of Psychiatry
- Spouse: Hilda North Stoessiger
- Children: 4

Sir Aubrey Julian Lewis (8 November 1900 – 21 January 1975), was a British-Australian psychiatrist. He was the first Professor of Psychiatry at the Institute of Psychiatry, London (now part of King's College London), and is credited with being a driving force behind the flowering of British psychiatry after World War II as well as raising the profile of the profession worldwide.

== Early life ==
Aubrey Julian Lewis was born on 8 November 1900 in Adelaide, the only child of Jewish parents George Solomon Lewis (died 23 May 1931), an English accountant known only as George Lewis, and his South Australian-born wife Rachel "Ré" Lewis (née Isaacs), a sister of Levi Isaacs, prominent member of Adelaide's Jewish community. Ré and Levi were among six children who were brought out to South Australia from Newcastle upon Tyne by their parents Solomon Isaacs (c. 1830 – 30 August 1913) and his wife Pauline (c. 1830 – 14 July 1923) aboard the ship Sophia around 1865

George Lewis married Ré Isaacs, elocution teacher and Adelaide Synagogue's longtime Sabbath School teacher, at the Synagogue on 16 August 1899.

Lewis was educated at Christian Brothers College, Wakefield Street, Adelaide, where he proved to be a gifted pupil. He studied medicine at the University of Adelaide and graduated with distinction in 1923 (M.B., B.S.).

== Career ==
Lewis worked at the Royal Adelaide Hospital for two years while undertaking physical anthropological research on Aboriginal Australians, in 1925 making detailed observations of twenty-six aborigines to record colour of hair, eyes and skin, ear formation, eyebrow ridges and what he termed 'personality characteristics'. In 1926 he accepted a Rockefeller Foundation fellowship in psychological medicine. This brought him to the Phipps Clinic under the mentorship of Adolf Meyer, whom he respected and admired greatly, and whose work he praised in lectures such as the Adolf Meyer Lecture in 1960. This was the start of two years postgraduate study performed in the US and thence on to Germany. Lewis then moved to the United Kingdom and joined the staff of the Maudsley Hospital London in 1928. In 1931, he received his M.D. from the University of Adelaide and in 1936 he became Clinical Director of the Maudsley Hospital. In 1938, he became a fellow of the Royal College of Physicians.

Lewis was a prominent member of the Eugenics Society. A chapter he contributed to a 1934 book on The Chances of Morbid Inheritance (edited by Carlos Blacker) has been described as "remarkable for its total admiration for the German work and workers". Particularly remarkable was Lewis' ardent enthusiasm for the sterilization and racial hygiene policies being championed at the time by one of Hitler's favorite scientists, the Nazi eugenicist Ernst Rudin. In his chapter, Lewis advocated state measures to limit genetic transmission by "many tramps, criminals, swindlers, irresponsibles and chronic dependants, agitators, hysterics - a large part of the social problem group."

=== Institute of Psychiatry ===
In 1946, the Maudsley Hospital's medical school was re-designated the Institute of Psychiatry under the auspices of the University of London and Lewis was appointed to the inaugural Chair of Psychiatry at the institute. He held this post until his retirement in 1966. It has been said that the flowering of British psychiatry after World War II can be attributed to three factors: a long humanitarian tradition; the National Health Service and Aubrey Lewis. Lewis built a reputation as a leader, educator and administrator and is credited with moulding the Institute into a model of scientific research and teaching attracting many of the most promising medical graduates from around the world. He is also credited with raising the profile of psychiatry worldwide, through his work as an adviser to general medical bodies, national and international research councils, and political organisations. He was a member of the Advisory Committee on Medical Research of the World Health Organization.

Many esteemed psychiatrists worked under the direction of Lewis at the Institute of Psychiatry, including Martin Roth and Michael Shepherd; the latter was at great pains to point out that Lewis's impact also extended to his contributions as a clinician, scholar and researcher, particularly in the field of epidemiology, but also genetics, clinical phenomenology and biology. He was perhaps best known for his studies of melancholia and obsessional illness, and indeed guided the young Michael Shepherd on his research into morbid jealousy.

== Honours and awards ==
- Knighthood (1959)
- International Member of the American Philosophical Society (1961)
- Honorary fellow of the Royal College of Psychiatrists (1972)

== Personal life ==
Lewis had an austere appearance, captured in Ruskin Spear's official portrait of 1966. But to those who knew him his high standards of personal and professional integrity went with a warm, kindly, humorous disposition which earned him the affection of colleagues and friends. Michael Shepherd described him as a "representative man" in Emerson's sense of the term.

== Publications ==
- The State of Psychiatry; Inquiries in Psychiatry (London, 1967)
- The Later Papers of Sir Aubrey Lewis (Oxford, 1977)
