= BMJ Mental Health =

- Discipline: Psychiatry
- Language: English
- Edited by: Andrea Cipriani

Publication details
- History: 1998–present
- Publisher: BMJ Group (United Kingdom)
- Frequency: Quarterly
- Impact factor: 6.6 (2025)

Standard abbreviations
- ISO 4: BMJ Ment. Health

Indexing
- ISSN: 1362-0347 (print); 1468-960X (web)

Links
- Journal homepage

BMJ Mental Health, formerly Evidence-Based Mental Health, is a quarterly peer-reviewed medical journal covering all aspects of mental health. It is co-owned by the BMJ Group, the Royal College of Psychiatrists, and the British Psychological Society.

== See also ==
- The BMJ, formerly British Medical Journal
