= Institute of Psychiatry, Psychology and Neuroscience =

Research institution in London, England

Coordinates: 51.4703°N 0.0898°W

Institute of Psychiatry, Psychology & Neuroscience, King's College London
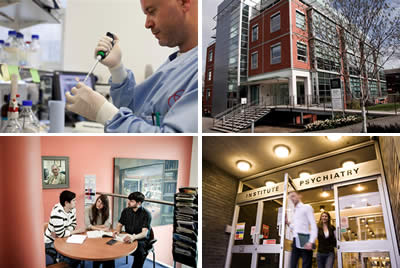
- Established: 1948
- Parent institution: King's College London
- Dean: Matthew Hotopf
- Location: SE5 8AF, London, United Kingdom
- Website: www.kcl.ac.uk/ioppn twitter.com/KingsIoPPN

The Institute of Psychiatry, Psychology & Neuroscience (IoPPN) is a centre for mental health and neuroscience research, education and training in Europe. It is dedicated to understanding, preventing and treating mental illness, neurological conditions, and other conditions that affect the brain. The IoPPN is a faculty of King's College London, England, and was previously known as the Institute of Psychiatry (IoP).

The institute works closely with South London and Maudsley NHS Foundation Trust. Many senior academic staff also work as honorary consultants for the trust in clinical services such as the National Psychosis Unit at Bethlem Royal Hospital.

The impact of the institute's work was judged to be 100% 'world-leading' or 'internationally-excellent' in the Research Excellence Framework (REF 2014). The research environment of the institute was also rated 100% 'world-leading'. King's College London was rated the second for research in Psychology, Psychiatry and Neuroscience in REF 2014.

== History ==
The IoPPN shares a great deal of its history with the Maudsley Hospital, with which it shares the location of its main building. It was part of the original plans of Frederick Mott and Henry Maudsley—inspired by the Munich institute of Emil Kraepelin—that the hospital would include facilities for teaching and research in 1896. In 1914, London County Council agreed to establish a hospital in Denmark Hill and Mott's plan began to take shape. The Maudsley Hospital was opened in 1923 as a result of a donation by Henry Maudsley.

Originally established as the "Maudsley Hospital Medical School" in 1924, it changed its name to the Institute of Psychiatry in 1948, with Aubrey Lewis appointed to the inaugural Chair of Psychiatry (which he held until his retirement in 1966). The main Institute building was opened in 1967 and contains lecture theatres, administrative offices, library and canteen.

In 1959 a group of genetic researchers led by Eliot Slater were given Medical Research Council funding to establish themselves as the 'MRC Psychiatric Genetics Unit'. Although this closed down in 1969, psychiatric genetics continued, eventually as the MRC Social, Genetic and Developmental Psychiatry Centre (SGDP Centre) which moved into new purpose-built building in 2002.

In 1997, the institute had split from the Maudsley and become instead a school of King's College London. The Henry Wellcome building was opened in 2001 and houses most of the IoPPN's psychology department. In 2004, a new Centre for Neuroimaging Sciences (CNS) was opened which provides offices, lab space, and access to two MRI scanners for neuroimaging research. In 2014 the institute was renamed to the Institute of Psychiatry, Psychology & Neuroscience (IoPPN), as the remit of the institute was broadened to include all brain and behavioural sciences.

== Departments ==
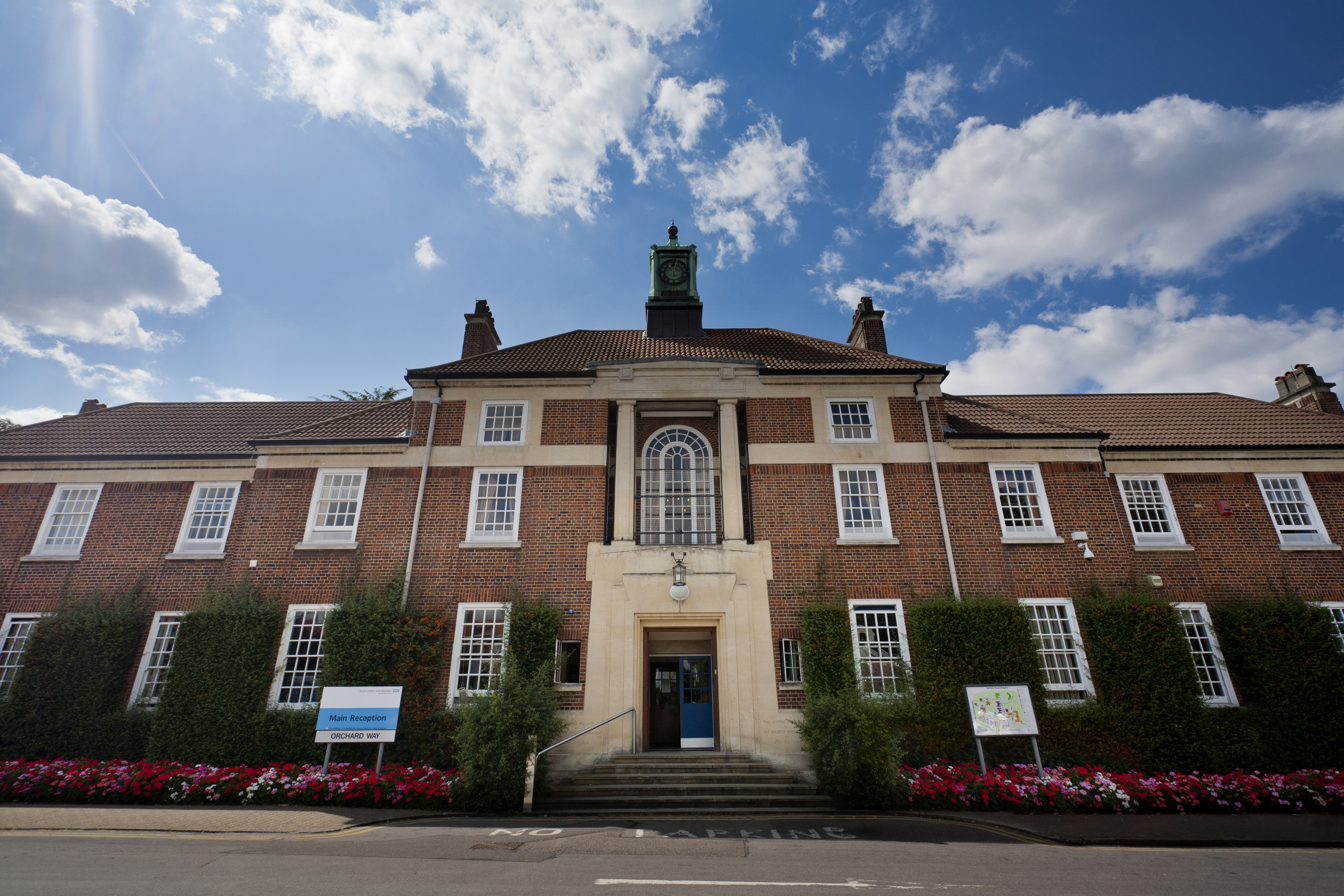
Many of the departments' staff also work in Bethlem Royal Hospital.

=== Addictions ===
The Addictions Department specialises in research into tobacco, alcohol and opiate addiction policy and treatment. In March 2010 the addiction research unit and the sections of alcohol research, tobacco research and behavioral pharmacology were brought together to form the current The Addictions Department, also known as the National Addiction Centre (NAC).

=== Biostatistics and Health Informatics ===
The Department of Biostatistics & Health Informatics develops quantitative methodology as applied to mental health research, with significant national and international collaborations. The Department is organised into two research groups: Biostatistics and Health Informatics.

The Biostatistics team specialise in five core areas: prediction modeling and personalised medicine, causal evaluation, psychometrics and measurement, lifecourse research, and mental health clinical trial statistics.

The Health Informatics team focuses on leveraging translational bioinformatics for complex diseases using diverse data sources—such as genomics, electronic health records, and wearable technology.

=== Child and Adolescent Psychiatry ===
The department is dedicated to the study of developmental disorders such as ADHD, clinical depression, autism and learning difficulties. The department has close links with the Michael Rutter Centre for Children and Young People at the Maudsley Hospital which has a number of specialist services for children and adolescents.

=== Forensic Mental Health Science ===
Forensic Mental Health Science is the study of antisocial, violent, and criminal behaviours among people with mental disorders. The department's research focuses on antisocial behaviour as it appears in people with either major mental disorders or personality disorders. The department is closely allied to the Forensic Psychiatry Teaching Unit.

=== Neuroscience ===
Researchers in this department carry out a range of studies into diseases such as Alzheimer's disease and motor neuron disease. The Institute of Psychiatry now houses the Medical Research Council Centre for Neurodegeneration Research, where pioneering research is conducted investigating disease of the CNS. The Department of Clinical Neuroscience in Windsor Walk also contains the MRC London Neurodegenerative Disease Brain Bank.

=== Department of Neuroimaging and Centre for Neuroimaging Sciences ===
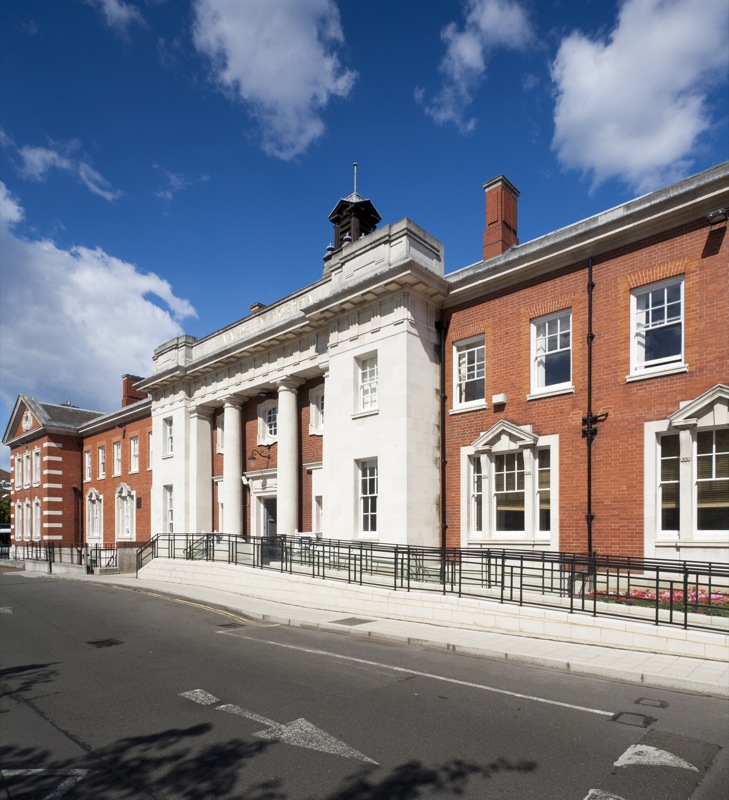
The Maudsley Hospital is the site of the institute's Clinical Neuroimaging Department.

The Centre for Neuroimaging Sciences (CNS) is a joint venture of the King's College London Institute of Psychiatry and the South London and Maudsley NHS Trust (SLAM). Completed in early 2004, the centre provides an interdisciplinary research environment.

The Clinical Neuroimaging Department, situated at the Maudsley Hospital, provides a full range of neuroradiographic imaging services, including magnetic resonance imaging (MRI). Within the CNS, the academic Department of Neuroimaging's Major Research Facility (MRF) manages a range of MRI facilities for research studies. The Department of Neuroimaging also runs an EEG laboratory, re-launched in 2010.

=== Psychology ===
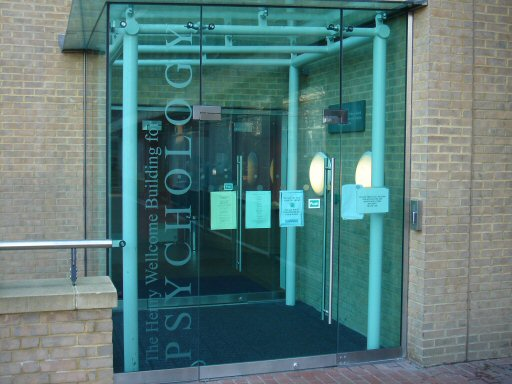
Entrance to the Henry Wellcome Psychology Building

The IoPPN Psychology department was founded in 1950. The department conducts research in neuropsychology, forensic psychology, and cognitive behavioural therapy. Hans Eysenck set up the UK's first qualification in clinical psychology in the department, which has now evolved into a three-year doctoral 'DClinPsych' qualification.

Clinically, members of the department offer expert services to the Maudsley Hospital, Bethlem Royal Hospital, King's College Hospital, Guy's Hospital and community mental health teams in the South London area. Members of the department also teach psychology to undergraduate medical students from the United Medical and Dental Schools of Guy's and St Thomas' Hospitals. Psychiatric geneticist Peter McGuffin was awarded a fellowship at the institute.

=== Psychological Medicine ===
The Department of Psychological Medicine, headed by Professor Trudie Chalder, addresses many of the commonest mental disorders which affect adults including depression, anxiety, post traumatic stress disorder, eating disorders, somatoform disorders, and medically unexplained symptoms and syndromes. Its research spans basic science, experimental medicine, epidemiology and public policy. It includes the King's Centre for Military Health Research, led by the department's former chair, Professor Sir Simon Wessely, and is responsible for studying the psychological impacts of the 2003 Iraq War. The department also contains a programme of work on liaison psychiatry and studies the many complex interactions between mental and physical illness.

=== Social, Genetic and Developmental Psychiatry ===
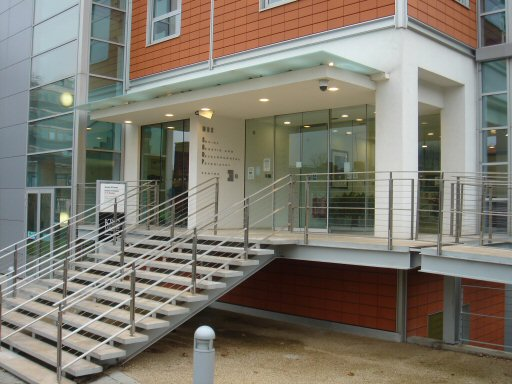
Entrance to the SGDP building

The SGDP centre is a multi-disciplinary research centre devoted to the study of the interplay between "nature" (genetics) and "nurture" (environment) as they interact in the development of complex human behaviour. Research at the SGDP acknowledges that there is no simple solution to the "nature versus nurture" debate; instead, expertise is combined across fields such as social epidemiology, child and adult psychiatry, developmental psychopathology, development in the family, personality traits, cognitive abilities, statistical genetics, and molecular genetics. In this way it is hoped that a greater understanding can be achieved in risk factors that might predispose an individual to depression, ADHD, or autism.

==== History ====
The MRC Social, Genetic and Developmental Psychiatry (SGDP) Centre was founded in 1994 by the Medical Research Council, in partnership with the Institute of Psychiatry (now a school of King's College London).

The research in social, genetic and developmental psychiatry have already existed at the Institute of Psychiatry since its establishment in 1948. However, the streams of research were not integrated and there have even been times when genetic researchers and social psychiatrists were in a state of hostility. The intellectual warfare between nature and nurture reached its peak in the 1960s and 1970s.

Aubrey Lewis, who was the first Professor of Psychiatry at the institute and the director of the MRC Social Psychiatry Research Unit (first MRC unit at the institute), noticed that social psychiatry was a broad field that included both biological substrate of disorders and social causes. Eliot Slater, the 'founding father' of psychiatric genetics in the United Kingdom, was encouraged by Lewis to study genetics in 1930s. In 1959, Slater established another MRC unit at the institute (MRC Psychiatric Genetics Unit), but the unit was closed in 1969 on Slater's retirement. In 1984, MRC Child Psychiatry Unit was established at the Institute of Psychiatry by Michael Rutter, a member in the MRC Social Psychiatry Research Unit led by Lewis. The unit brought together experts in many overlapping fields, and the mix proved highly successful as the unit had a major impact on child psychiatric research throughout the world.

The MRC Social Psychiatry Research Unit was closed in 1993. The MRC and the institute found that there was a need for refocusing and reintegration with other strands of research including psychiatric genetics and disorders of adult life. Rutter and David Goldberg discussed with the MRC about the establishment of an interdisciplinary research centre that could comprehensively study the interplay of nature and nurture in the development of psychiatric disorders. In 1994, MRC SGDP Centre was established in Denmark Hill, and Rutter was appointed as the first director of the centre. The SGDP Centre has moved into its new purpose-built building in 2002.

=== Psychosis Studies ===
The department is the most highly cited group of scientists working on schizophrenia and related disorders. Work focuses on integrating cognitive measures and multimodal neuroimaging techniques, with perinatal, genetic and developmental data. The central aim is to characterize the core pathophysiological dimensions of schizophrenia and bipolar disorder. The section has initiated or participated a number of such treatment studies of new atypical antipsychotics and potential mood stabilising medication and is also developing computerised and web-based applications for disease self-management.

=== Maurice Wohl Clinical Neuroscience Institute ===
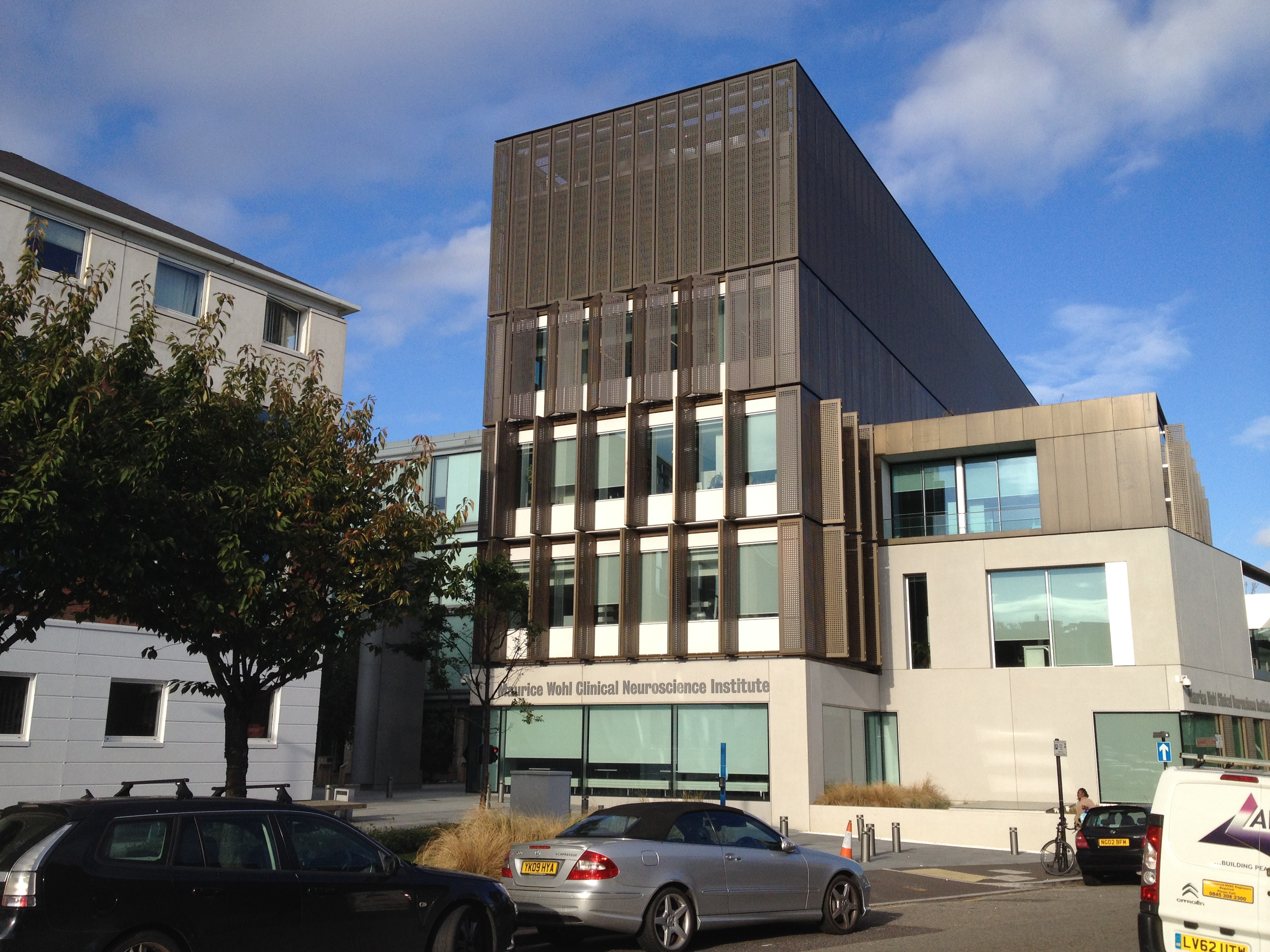
Maurice Wohl Clinical Neuroscience Institute

The Maurice Wohl Clinical Neuroscience Institute is a centre for neuroscience research opened by The Princess Royal in 2015. It is one of the leading neuroscience institutes in the world. The centre is named after British philanthropist Maurice Wohl, who supported many medical projects and had a long association with King's College London, and was funded by several philanthropic donors, organisations and King's Health Partners.

The Maurice Wohl Clinical Neuroscience Institute focuses on the development of new treatments to patients affected by neurodegenerative diseases (such as Alzheimer's disease, Parkinson's disease and motor neurone disease), mental disorders (depression, schizophrenia) and neurological diseases (including epilepsy and stroke), and the understanding of disease mechanisms. The research institute has 250 clinicians and research scientists from neuroimaging, neurology, psychiatry, genetics, molecular and cellular biology and drug discovery.

The current three major goals of the institute is to determine the underlying genetic and environmental risk factors for disease, to identify tests for early diagnosis and biomarkers that measure disease progression, and to develop informative cellular and animal disease models of disease to accelerate drug discovery.

== Funding ==
Approximately 70% of the IoPPN's income comes from the research it conducts. Approximately 20% is from clinical work performed for the South London and Maudsley NHS Foundation Trust. Approximately 10% of gross income is from taught courses offered to postgraduate students.

Sources include the government's National Institute for Health and Care Research (NIHR) and Higher Education Funding Council for England, grant-giving bodies such as the Medical Research Council (UK) and the Wellcome Trust, as well as other governmental, charitable and private-sector organisations. Individual research teams secure around £130 million of funds for their projects each year. Many projects are carried out in partnership with other university and health services, charities and private companies.

The IoPPN and the pharmaceutical company Lundbeck have led one of the largest-ever academic-industry collaborations in research, known as NEWMEDS - Novel Methods leading to New Medications in Depression and Schizophrenia. The project is part of the Innovative Medicines Initiative developed by the European Federation of Pharmaceutical Industries and Associations and the European Commission. NEWMEDS aims to facilitate the development of new psychiatric medications by bringing top scientists and academics together in partnership with nearly every major global drug company.

Another key project is the KCL and Janssen led pre competitive public private consortium RADAR-CNS (Remote Measurement of Disease and Relapse in Central Nervous System Disorders), which uses smartphones and wearable devices to track clinical outcomes in disorders like depression, multiple sclerosis and epilepsy.

== Notable staff and students ==
Amongst notable staff of the institute are the following:

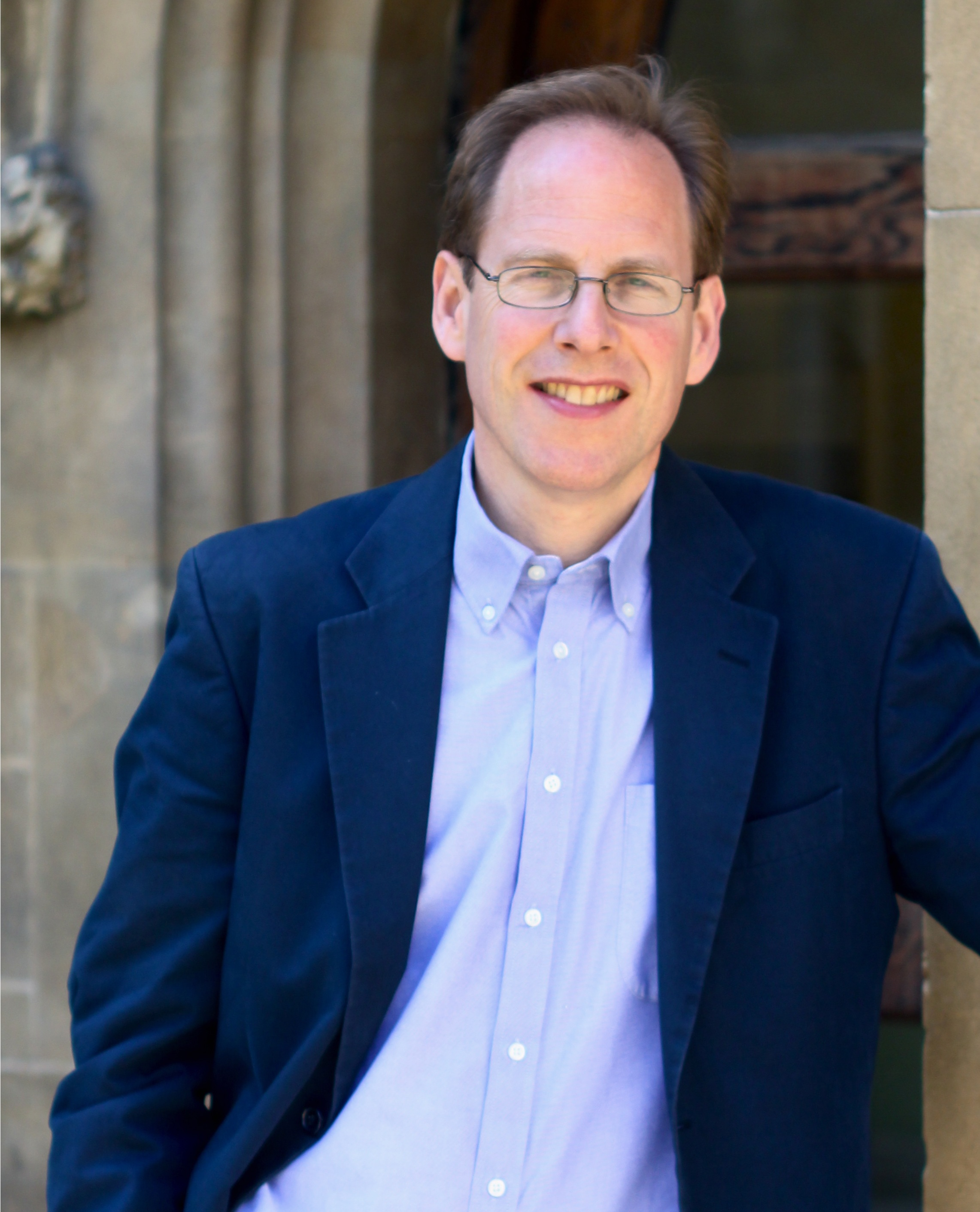
Simon Baron-Cohen

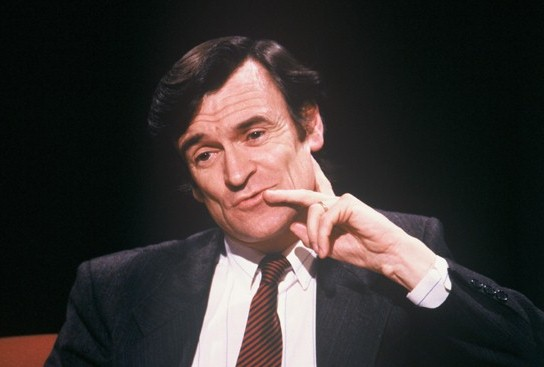
Anthony Clare

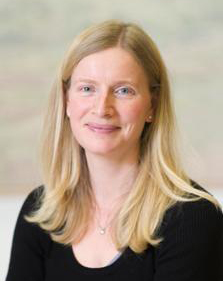
Thalia C. Eley

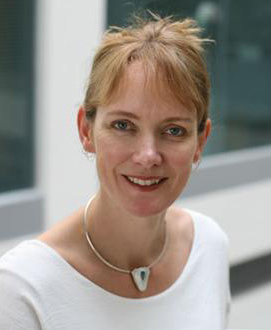
Francesca Happé

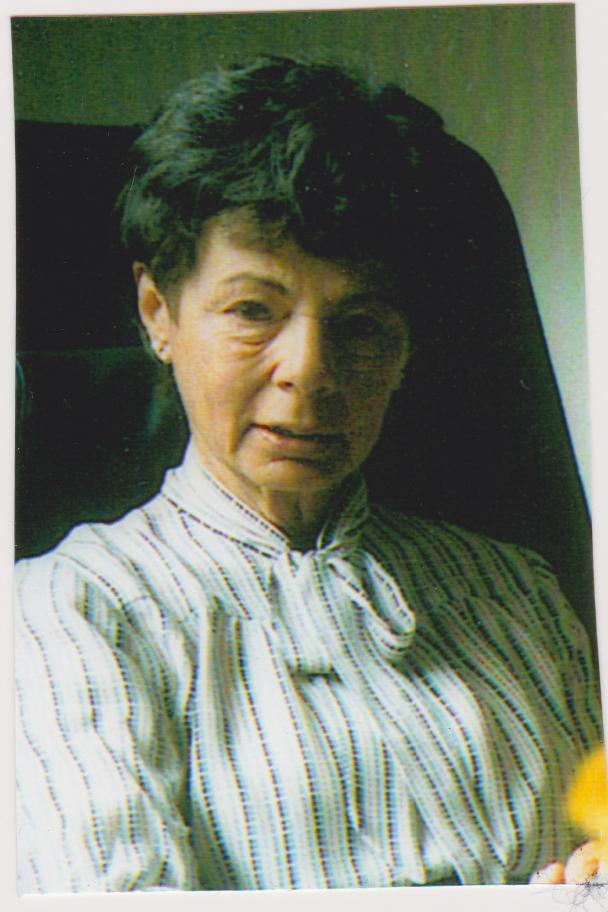
Beate Hermelin

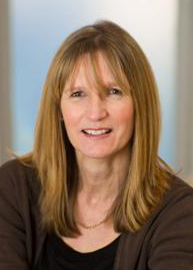
Susan Lea

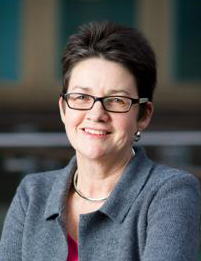
Ann McNeill

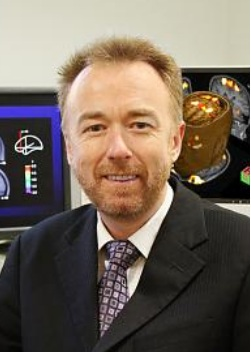
Adrian Owen

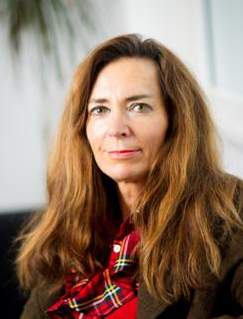
Katya Rubia

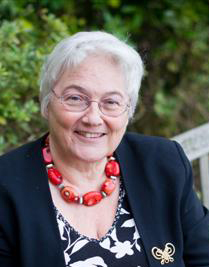
Janet Treasure

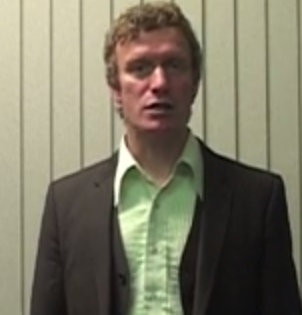
Nicholas Troop

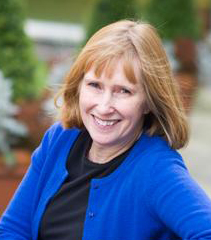
Til Wykes

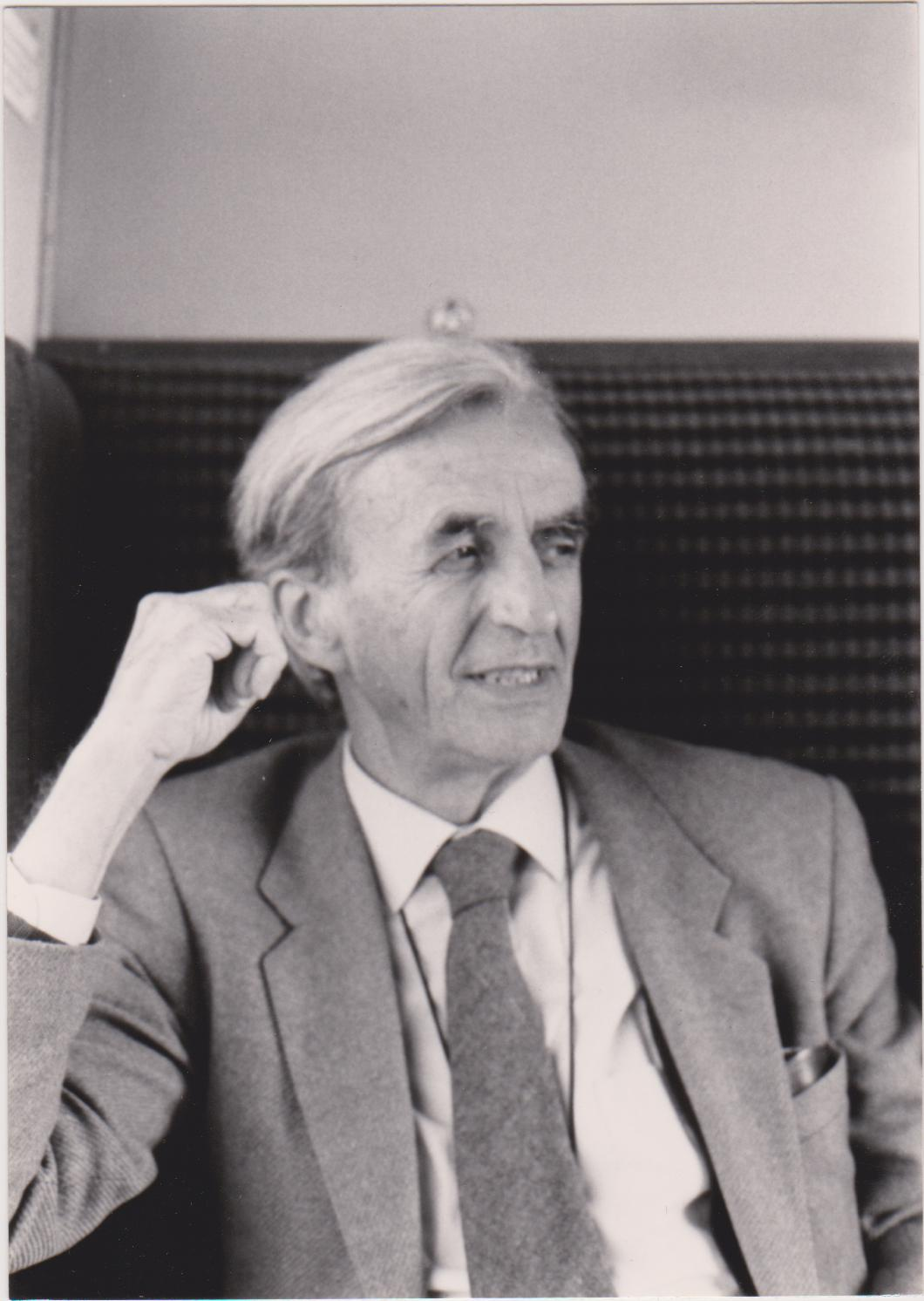
Neil O'Connor

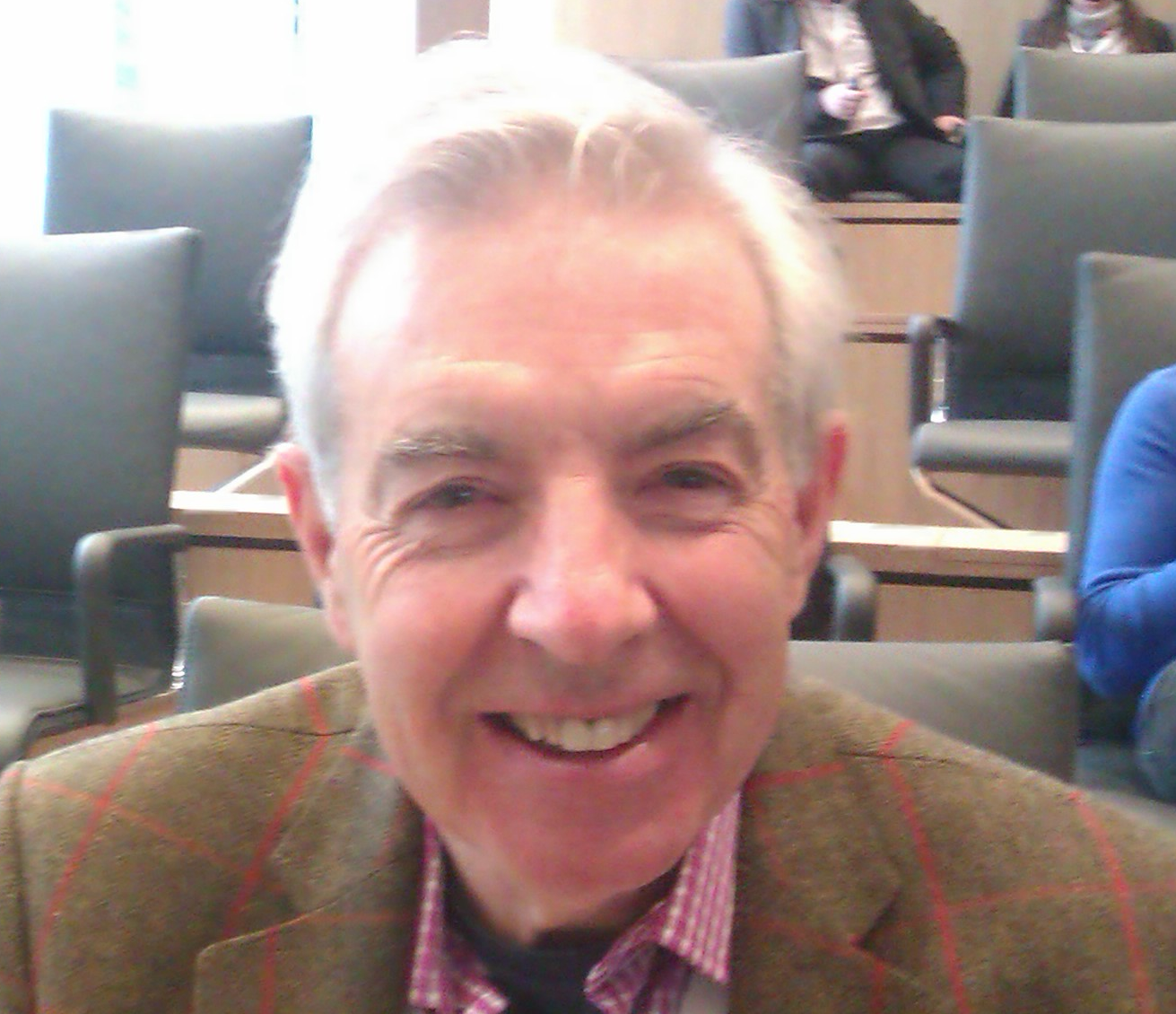
Robin Murray
- Trudie Chalder
- John Cutting
- Arsime Demjaha (psychiatrist)
- Daniel Freeman
- Jeffrey Alan Gray
- Khalida Ismail
- Aubrey Lewis
- Patrick Leman
- Robert Plomin
- Donald Prell (psychologist and futurologist)
- Martin Roth
- Paul Salkovskis (clinical psychologist)
- William Sargant
- Peter Scott (psychiatrist)
- David Stafford-Clark
- Pamela Taylor (psychiatrist)

== See also ==
- Maudsley Bipolar Twin Study
