= Accident-proneness =

Idea that some people are more likely than others to experience accidents

Accident-proneness is the idea that some people have a greater predisposition than others to experience accidents, such as car crashes and industrial injuries. It may be used as a reason to deny any insurance on such individuals.

== Early work ==
The early work on this subject dates back to 1919, in a study by Greenwood and Woods, who studied workers at a British munitions factory and found that accidents were unevenly distributed among workers, with a relatively small proportion of workers accounting for most of the accidents. Further work on accident-proneness was carried out in the 1930s and 1940s.

== Present study ==
The subject is still being studied actively. Research into accident-proneness is of great interest in safety engineering, where human factors such as pilot error, or errors by nuclear plant operators, can have massive effects on the reliability and safety of a system. Another field of interest is aeronautics, where accidents have been reviewed from psychological and human factors to mechanical and technical failures. Numerous conclusive studies have presented that a human factor has great influence on the results of those occurrences.

=== Statistical evidence ===
Statistical evidence clearly demonstrates that different individuals can have different rates of accidents from one another; for example, young male drivers are the group at highest risk for being involved in car accidents. Substantial variation in personal accident rates also seem to occur between individuals.

=== Doubt ===
A number of studies have cast doubt, though, on whether accident-proneness actually exists as a "distinct, persistent and independently verifiable" physiological or psychological syndrome. Although substantial research has been devoted to this subject, no conclusive evidence seems to exist either for or against the existence of accident-proneness in this sense.

=== Nature and causes ===
The exact nature and causes of accident-proneness, assuming that it exists as a distinct entity, are unknown. Factors which have been considered as associated with accident-proneness have included absent-mindedness, clumsiness, carelessness, impulsivity, predisposition to risk-taking, and unconscious desires to create accidents as a way of achieving secondary gains. Broad studies on the speed and accuracy using a specially designed test sheet have been conducted on various people, such as Japanese, Brazil-born Japanese, Chinese, Russian, Spanish, Filipino, Thai, and Central American with different educational backgrounds. The studies have revealed that educational background or study experience is the key factor of concentration capability. Screening new employees using this test gave drastic decreases in work accidents in several companies.

=== Hypophobia ===
In July 1992, Behavioral Ecology published experimental research conducted by biologist Lee A. Dugatkin where guppies were sorted into "bold", "ordinary", and "timid" groups based upon their reactions when confronted by a smallmouth bass (i.e. inspecting the predator, hiding, or swimming away) after which the guppies were left in a tank with the bass. After 60 hours, 40 percent of the timid guppies and 15 percent of the ordinary guppies survived while none of the bold guppies did.

In The Handbook of the Emotions (1993), psychologist Arne Öhman studied pairing an unconditioned stimulus with evolutionarily-relevant fear-response neutral stimuli (snakes and spiders) versus evolutionarily-irrelevant fear-response neutral stimuli (mushrooms, flowers, physical representation of polyhedra, firearms, and electrical outlets) on human subjects and found that ophidiophobia and arachnophobia required only one pairing to develop a conditioned response while mycophobia, anthophobia, phobias of physical representations of polyhedra, firearms, and electrical outlets required multiple pairings and went extinct without continued conditioning while the conditioned ophidiophobia and arachnophobia were permanent. Similarly, psychologists Susan Mineka, Richard Keir, and Veda Price found that laboratory-raised rhesus macaques did not display fear if required to reach across a toy snake to receive a banana unless the macaque was shown a video of another macaque withdrawing in fright from the toy (which produced a permanent fear-response), while being shown a similar video of another macaque displaying fear of a flower produced no similar response.

Psychologist Paul Ekman cites the following anecdote recounted by Charles Darwin in The Expression of the Emotions in Man and Animals (1872) in connection with Öhman's research:

I put my face close to the thick glass-plate in front of a puff-adder in the Zoological Gardens, with the firm determination of not starting back if the snake struck at me; but, as soon as the blow was struck, my resolution went for nothing, and I jumped a yard or two backwards with astonishing rapidity. My will and reason were powerless against the imagination of a danger which had never been experienced.

In May 1998, Behaviour Research and Therapy published a longitudinal survey by psychologists Richie Poulton, Simon Davies, Ross G. Menzies, John D. Langley, and Phil A. Silva of subjects sampled from the Dunedin Multidisciplinary Health and Development Study who had been injured in a fall between the ages of 5 and 9, compared them to children who had no similar injury, and found that at age 18, acrophobia was present in only 2 percent of the subjects who had an injurious fall but was present among 7 percent of subjects who had no injurious fall (with the same sample finding that typical basophobia was 7 times less common in subjects at age 18 who had injurious falls as children than subjects that did not).

Psychiatrists Isaac Marks and Randolph M. Nesse and evolutionary biologist George C. Williams have noted that people with systematically deficient responses to various adaptive phobias (e.g. basophobia, ophidiophobia, arachnophobia) are more temperamentally careless and more likely to receive unintentional injuries that are potentially fatal and have proposed that such deficient phobia should be classified as "hypophobia" due to its selfish genetic consequences. Nesse notes that while conditioned fear responses to evolutionarily novel dangerous objects such as electrical outlets is possible, the conditioning is slower because such cues have no prewired connection to fear, noting further that despite the emphasis of the risks of speeding and drunk driving in driver's education, it alone does not provide reliable protection against traffic collisions and that nearly one-quarter of all deaths in 2014 of people aged 15 to 24 in the United States were in traffic collisions.

In April 2006, The Indian Journal of Pediatrics published a study comparing 108 secondary education students attending a special education school that were diagnosed with attention deficit hyperactivity disorder (ADHD) or a learning disability to a control group of 87 secondary school students that found the treatment group had experienced 0.57±1.6 accidents while the control group had experienced 0.23±0.4 accidents. In June 2016, the Journal of Attention Disorders published a study comparing a survey of 13,347 subjects (ages 3 to 17) from Germany in a nationwide, representative cross-sectional health interview and examination dataset collected by the Robert Koch Institute and a survey of 383,292 child and adolescent policyholders of a German health insurance company based in Saxony and Thuringia. Using a chi-squared test on accident data about the subjects, the study found that 15.7% of subjects were reported to have been involved in an accident requiring medical treatment during the previous 12 months, while the percentage of ADHD subjects that had been involved in an accident was 23% versus 15.3% among the non-ADHD group and that the odds ratio for accidents was 1.6 for ADHD subjects compared to those without. Of the subjects in both samples diagnosed with ADHD (653 subjects and 18,741 policyholders respectively), approximately three-quarters of cases in both surveys were male (79.8% and 73.3% respectively).

In March 2016, Frontiers in Psychology published a survey of 457 post-secondary student Facebook users (following a face validity pilot of another 47 post-secondary student Facebook users) at a large university in North America showing that the severity of ADHD symptoms had a statistically significant positive correlation with Facebook usage while driving a motor vehicle and that impulses to use Facebook while driving were more potent among male users than female users. In January 2014, Accident Analysis & Prevention published a meta-analysis of 16 studies examining the relative risk of traffic collisions for drivers with ADHD, finding an overall relative risk estimate of 1.36 without controlling for exposure, a relative risk estimate of 1.29 when controlling for publication bias, a relative risk estimate of 1.23 when controlling for exposure, and a relative risk estimate of 1.86 for ADHD drivers with oppositional defiant disorder or conduct disorder comorbidities. In June 2021, Neuroscience & Biobehavioral Reviews published a systematic review of 82 studies that all confirmed or implied elevated accident-proneness in ADHD patients and whose data suggested that the type of accidents or injuries and overall risk changes in ADHD patients over the lifespan.

In November 1999, Biological Psychiatry published a literature review by psychiatrists Joseph Biederman and Thomas Spencer on the pathophysiology of ADHD that found the average heritability estimate of ADHD from twin studies to be 0.8, while a subsequent family, twin, and adoption studies literature review published in Molecular Psychiatry in April 2019 by psychologists Stephen Faraone and Henrik Larsson that found an average heritability estimate of 0.74. Additionally, Randolph M. Nesse has argued that the 5:1 male-to-female sex ratio in the epidemiology of ADHD suggests that ADHD may be the end of a continuum where males are overrepresented at the tails, citing clinical psychologist Simon Baron-Cohen's suggestion for the sex ratio in the epidemiology of autism as an analogue. Despite critique about its limited scope, methodology, and atheoretical character, the Big Five personality traits model (which includes conscientiousness) is well-established and well-replicated, and it has been suggested that the Big Five may have distinct biological substrates.

== See also ==
- Accident analysis
- Accident insurance
- Congenital insensitivity to pain
- Counterphobic attitude
- Developmental coordination disorder § Associated disorders
- Diathesis–stress model
- Effects of the car on societies
- Human factors and ergonomics
- Lead–crime hypothesis
- Passive–aggressive behavior
- Traffic collision
