= Ophidiophobia =

Fear of snakes

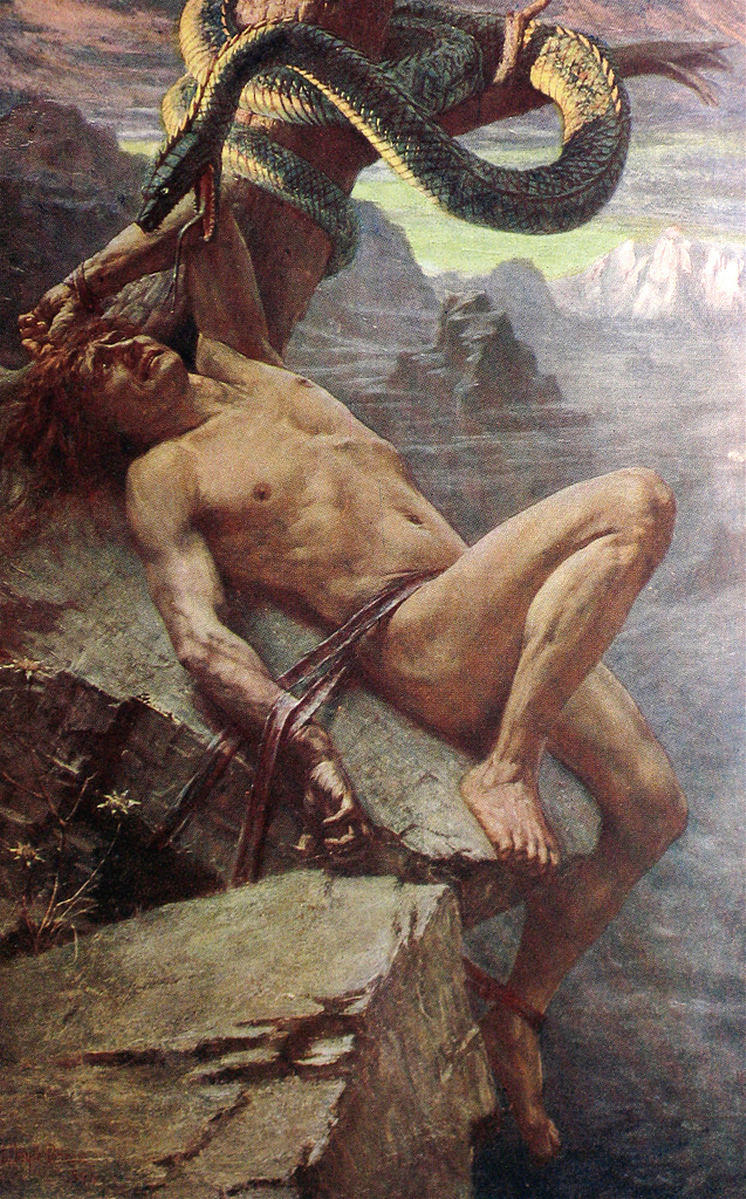
The Punishment of Loki by J. Doyle Penrose

Ophidiophobia (/əˌfɪdioʊˈfoʊbiə/) or ophiophobia (/ˌoʊfioʊˈfoʊbiə/) is fear of snakes. It is sometimes called by the more general term herpetophobia, fear of reptiles. The word comes from the Ancient Greek: ὄφις, romanized: óphis, lit. 'snake', and φοβία, phobía, 'fear'.

== Research ==
About one-third of adult humans have a fear of snakes, making it one of the most commonly reported phobias. However, adults manifesting "clinically relevant" ophidiophobia accounts for only about 3–4% of the population.

In The Handbook of the Emotions (1993), psychologist Arne Öhman studied pairing an unconditioned stimulus with evolutionarily-relevant fear-response neutral stimuli (snakes and spiders) versus evolutionarily-irrelevant fear-response neutral stimuli (mushrooms, flowers, physical representation of polyhedra, firearms, and electrical outlets) on human subjects and found that ophidiophobia and arachnophobia required only one pairing to develop a conditioned response while mycophobia, anthophobia, phobias of physical representations of polyhedra, firearms, and electrical outlets required multiple pairings and went extinct without continued conditioning while the conditioned ophidiophobia and arachnophobia were permanent. Similarly, psychologists Susan Mineka, Richard Keir, and Veda Price found that laboratory-raised rhesus macaques did not display fear if required to reach across a toy snake to receive a banana unless the macaque was shown a video of another macaque withdrawing in fright from the toy (which produced a permanent fear-response), while being shown a similar video of another macaque displaying fear of a flower produced no similar response.

Psychologist Paul Ekman cites this anecdote by Charles Darwin in The Expression of the Emotions in Man and Animals (1872) in connection with Öhman's research:

I put my face close to the thick glass-plate in front of a puff-adder in the Zoological Gardens, with the firm determination of not starting back if the snake struck at me; but, as soon as the blow was struck, my resolution went for nothing, and I jumped a yard or two backwards with astonishing rapidity. My will and reason were powerless against the imagination of a danger which had never been experienced.

Psychiatrist Randolph M. Nesse notes that while conditioned fear responses to evolutionarily novel dangers such as electrical outlets is possible, the conditioning is slower because such cues have no prewired connection to fear, and that despite the emphasis on the risks of speeding and drunk driving in driver's education, it does not provide reliable protection against traffic collisions and that nearly one-quarter of all deaths in 2014 of people aged 15 to 24 in the United States were in traffic collisions.

Also, Nesse, psychiatrist Isaac Marks, and evolutionary biologist George C. Williams wrote that people with systematically deficient responses to adaptive phobias (e.g. ophidiophobia, arachnophobia, basophobia) are more temperamentally careless and more likely to receive unintentional injuries that are potentially fatal and have proposed that such deficient phobia should be classified as "hypophobia" due to its selfish genetic consequences. Evolutionary biologist Richard Dawkins argued that simulation and imagination would be favored by natural selection over trial-and-error learning across species due to the selfish genetic consequences, while anthropologist Christopher Boehm argued vicarious cultural learning would be favored over trial-and-error learning in noting how Kalahari Bushmen parents teach their children about likely locations of venomous snakes. Likewise, cognitive scientist Steven Pinker has noted that wariness around snakes, folk biology, folk taxonomies, and abstraction in speech and thought are all cultural universals.

A 2001 study at the Karolinska Institute in Sweden suggested that mammals may have an innate negative reaction to snakes (and spiders), which was vital for their survival as it allowed such threats to be identified immediately. A 2009 report of a 40-year research program demonstrated strong fear conditioning to snakes in humans and fast nonconscious processing of snake images; these are mediated by a fear network in the human brain involving the amygdala. A 2013 study provided neurobiological evidence in primates (macaques) of natural selection for detecting snakes rapidly.
