= Arachnophobia =

Fear of spiders and other arachnids

- Other names: Arachnephobia
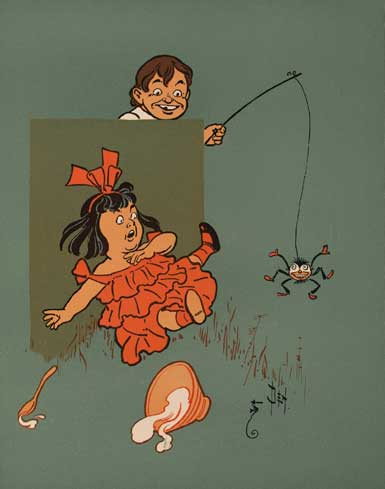
- Though most arachnids are harmless, a person with arachnophobia may still panic or feel uneasy around one. Sometimes, even an object resembling a spider can trigger a panic attack in an arachnophobic individual. The above cartoon is a depiction of the nursery rhyme "Little Miss Muffet", in which the title character is "frightened away" by a spider.
- Pronunciation: /ə.ˌræk.nə.ˈfoʊ.bi.ə/, ə-RAK-nə-FOH-bee-ə
- Specialty: Psychiatry
- Treatment: Exposure therapy, Virtual reality therapy and Augmented reality

Arachnophobia is the fear of spiders and other arachnids, such as scorpions and ticks. Arachnophobia is a specific phobia and is one of the most common described anxiety disorders.

The word "arachnophobia" comes from the Greek words αράχνη (arákhnē) which means spider and φοβία (phóbos) means fear or terror.

== Signs and symptoms ==
People with arachnophobia tend to feel uneasy in any area they believe could harbour spiders or that has visible signs of their presence, such as webs. If arachnophobes see a spider, they may not enter the general vicinity until they have overcome the panic attack that is often associated with their phobia. Some people scream, cry, have emotional outbursts, experience trouble breathing, sweat and experience increased heart rates when they come in contact with an area near spiders or their webs. In some extreme cases, even a picture, a toy, or a realistic drawing of a spider can trigger intense fear.

== Causes ==
The reason for the prevalence of arachnophobia in the population is not fully understood. Some researchers suggest that it may have evolved from an instinctive response that helped early humans survive. Others suggest that it is a cultural phenomenon that is most common in European societies.

=== Evolutionary view ===
Several evolutionary explanations for arachnophobia have been proposed. One view, especially held in evolutionary psychology, is that the presence of venomous spiders led to the evolution of a fear of spiders, or made the acquisition of a fear of spiders especially easy. Being relatively small, spiders do not fit the usual criterion for a threat in the animal kingdom where size is a factor, but they can have medically significant venom and/or cause skin irritation with their setae.

By ensuring that their surroundings were free from spiders, arachnophobes would have had a reduced risk of being bitten in ancestral environments, giving them a slight advantage over non-arachnophobes in terms of survival.

The evolutionary view is complicated by a lack of evidence of a sufficient number of dangerous spider species in Africa during the Pleistocene to trigger such an evolutionary fear. Additionally, having a disproportionate fear of spiders in comparison to other, potentially more dangerous creatures present during Homo sapiens' environment of evolutionary adaptiveness may have had drawbacks.

In The Handbook of the Emotions (1993), psychologist Arne Öhman studied pairing an unconditioned stimulus with evolutionarily-relevant fear-response neutral stimuli (snakes and spiders) versus evolutionarily-irrelevant fear-response neutral stimuli (mushrooms, flowers, physical representation of polyhedra, firearms, and electrical outlets) on human subjects and found that ophidiophobia (fear of snakes) and arachnophobia required only one pairing to develop a conditioned response while mycophobia, anthophobia, phobias of physical representations of polyhedra, firearms, and electrical outlets required multiple pairings and went extinct without continued conditioning while the conditioned ophidiophobia and arachnophobia were permanent.

Psychiatrist Randolph M. Nesse notes that while conditioned fear responses to evolutionarily novel dangerous objects such as electrical outlets is possible, the conditioning is slower because such cues have no prewired connection to fear, noting further that despite the emphasis of the risks of speeding and drunk driving in driver's education, it alone does not provide reliable protection against traffic collisions and that nearly one-quarter of all deaths in 2014 of people aged 15 to 24 in the United States were in traffic collisions. Nesse, psychiatrist Isaac Marks, and evolutionary biologist George C. Williams have noted that people with systematically deficient responses to various adaptive phobias (e.g. arachnophobia, ophidiophobia, basophobia) are more temperamentally careless and more likely to receive unintentional injuries that are potentially fatal and have proposed that such deficient phobia should be classified as "hypophobia" due to its selfish genetic consequences.

A 2001 study found that people could detect images of spiders among images of flowers and mushrooms more quickly than they could detect images of flowers or mushrooms among images of spiders. The researchers suggested that this was because fast response to spiders was more relevant to human evolution: subsequent replications of a comparable exposure to pictures of spiders or spider-resembling flowers confirmed that these stimuli (even if administered very briefly, 33 ms) elicited specific psychophysiological correlates in phobic participants.

A 2021 research article found that perceived fear and disgust of spiders were triggered predominantly by enlarged chelicerae, enlarged abdomen, and the presence of body hair, an observation integrated and confirmed by a study making use of augmented reality to study the sensibility of more-or-less phobic participants towards specific perceptual features of spiders (movement pattern, hairiness, body-leg ratio).

=== Cultural view ===
An alternative view is that the dangers, such as from spiders, are overrated and not sufficient to influence evolution. Instead, inheriting phobias would have restrictive and debilitating effects upon survival, rather than being an aid. For some communities, such as in Papua New Guinea and Cambodia, spiders are included in traditional foods. This suggests arachnophobia may, at least in part, be a cultural rather than genetic trait.

Stories about spiders in the media often contain errors and use sensationalistic vocabulary, which could contribute to the fear of spiders.

== Treatments ==
The fear of spiders can be treated by any of the general techniques suggested for specific phobias. The first line of treatment is systematic desensitization – also known as exposure therapy. Before engaging in systematic desensitization, it is common to train the individual with arachnophobia in relaxation techniques, which will help keep the patient calm. Systematic desensitization can be done in vivo (with live spiders) or by getting the individual to imagine situations involving spiders, then modelling interaction with spiders for the person affected and eventually interacting with real spiders. This technique can be effective in just one session, although it generally takes more time.

Recent advances in technology have enabled the use of virtual or augmented reality spiders for use in therapy. These techniques have proven to be effective.

== Epidemiology ==
Arachnophobia affects 3.5-6.1% of the global population.

Even though most spiders are small and not venomous, they still trigger intense fear in many people, making arachnophobia one of the most widespread anxiety disorders. It is strongly linked to sociodemographic factors like gender, age, education, and an individual's tendency toward disgust. The majority of studies show that females are more likely to develop this phobia.

== See also ==
- List of phobias
