= Fear of falling =

Natural fear typical of most mammals

The fear of falling (FOF), also referred to as basophobia (or basiphobia), is a natural fear and is typical of most humans and mammals, in varying degrees of extremity. It differs from acrophobia (the fear of heights), although the two fears are closely related. The fear of falling encompasses the anxieties accompanying the sensation and the possibly dangerous effects of falling, as opposed to the heights themselves. Those who have little fear of falling may be said to have a head for heights. Basophobia is sometimes associated with astasia-abasia, the fear of walking/standing erect.

== In humans ==
=== Infants ===
Studies done by psychologists Eleanor J. Gibson and Richard D. Walk have further explained the nature of this fear. One of their more famous studies is the "visual cliff". Below is their description of the cliff:

…a board laid across a large sheet of heavy glass which is supported a foot or more above the floor. On one side of the board a sheet of patterned material is placed flush against the undersurface of the glass, giving the glass the appearance as well as the substance of solidity. On the other side a sheet of the same material is laid upon the floor; this side of the board thus becomes the visual cliff.

Thirty-six infants were tested in their experiments, ranging from six to fourteen months. Gibson and Walk found that when placed on the board, 27 of the infants would crawl on the shallow side when called by their mothers; only three ventured off the "edge" of the cliff. Many infants would crawl away from their mothers who were calling from the deep end, and some would cry because they couldn’t reach their mothers without crossing an apparent chasm. Some would pat the glass on the deep end, but even with this assurance would not crawl on the glass. These results, although unable to prove that this fear is innate, indicate that most human infants have well-developed depth perception and are able to make the connection between depth and the danger that accompanies falling.

In May 1998, Behaviour Research and Therapy published a longitudinal survey by psychologists Richie Poulton, Simon Davies, Ross G. Menzies, John D. Langley, and Phil A. Silva of subjects sampled from the Dunedin Multidisciplinary Health and Development Study who had been injured in a fall between the ages of 5 and 9, compared them to children who had no similar injury, and found that at age 18, acrophobia was present in only 2 percent of the subjects who had an injurious fall but was present among 7 percent of subjects who had no injurious fall (with the same sample finding that typical basophobia was 7 times less common in subjects at age 18 who had injurious falls as children than subjects that did not). Psychiatrists Isaac Marks and Randolph M. Nesse and evolutionary biologist George C. Williams have noted that people with systematically deficient responses to various adaptive phobias (e.g. basophobia, ophidiophobia, arachnophobia) are more temperamentally careless and more likely to receive unintentional injuries that are potentially fatal and have proposed that such deficient phobia should be classified as "hypophobia" due to its selfish genetic consequences.

=== Elderly persons ===
For a long time, the fear of falling was merely believed to be a result of the psychological trauma of a fall, also called "post-fall syndrome". This syndrome was first mentioned in 1982 by Murphy and Isaacs, who noticed that after a fall, ambulatory persons developed intense fear and walking disorders. Fear of falling has been identified as one of the key symptoms of this syndrome. Since that time, FOF has gained recognition as a specific health problem among older adults. However, FOF was also commonly found among elderly persons who had not yet experienced a fall.

Prevalence of FOF appears to increase with age and to be higher in women. Age remains significant in multiple logistic regression analyses. The results of different studies have reported gender as a somewhat significant risk factor for fear of falling. Other risk factors of fear of falling in the elderly include dizziness, self-rated health status, depression, and problems with gait and balance.

== In animals ==
Studies of nonhuman subjects support the theory that falling is an inborn fear. Gibson and Walk performed identical experiments with chicks, turtles, rats, kids, lambs, kittens, and puppies. The results were similar to those of the human infants, although each animal behaved a little differently according to the characteristics of its species.

The chicks were tested less than 24 hours after hatching. It suggested that depth perception develops quickly in chickens, as the chicks never made the "mistake" of walking off the "deep" side of the cliff. The kids and lambs were also tested as soon as they could stand on their own. During the experiment, no goat or lamb ever stepped onto the glass of the deep side. When placed there, the animals displayed typical behavior by going into a posture of defense, with their front legs rigid and their back legs limp. In this state of immobility, the animals were pushed forward across the glass until their head and field of vision crossed the solid edge on the opposite side of the cliff; the goats and lambs would then relax and proceed to spring forward upon its surface. Based on the results of the animals tested, the danger and fear of falling is instilled in animals at a very young age.

== Factors that influence the fear of falling ==
=== Postural control ===
The postural control system has two functions: to ensure that balance is maintained by bracing the body against gravity, and to fix the orientation and position of the features that serve as a frame of reference for perception and action with respect to the external world. Postural control relies on multisensory processing and motor responses that seem to be automatic and occur without awareness. Studies have shown that people afraid of heights or falling have poor postural control, especially in the absence of strong visual cues. These individuals rely heavily on vision to regulate their posture and balance. When faced with high or unstable ground, the vestibular system in these individuals senses the instability and attempts to correct it by increasing postural sway to reactivate visual balance feedback (postural sway refers to the phenomenon of constant displacement and correction of the position of the center of gravity within the base of support). This often fails, however, resulting in a feeling of increased instability and anxiety, which is often interpreted as fear.

=== Height vertigo ===
Closely related to postural control is the sensation of vertigo: a warning signal created by a loss of postural control when the distance between the observer and visible stationary objects becomes too large, and caused by a dysfunction of the vestibular system in the inner ear. In short, it is the feeling of motion when one is actually stationary. Symptoms of vertigo include dizziness, nausea, vomiting, shortness of breath, and the inability to walk or stand. Some individuals are more reliant on visual cues to control posture than others. Vestibular sensations can arise when unsound information is detected along the sensory channels (this happens even to those with normal vestibular function), and feelings of vertigo can result in people with postural control issues.

=== Space and motion discomfort ===
Studies have shown that people with acrophobia or an extreme fear of falling have higher scores of SMD, or space and motion discomfort. These are physical symptoms elicited by visual or kinesthetic information that is inadequate for normal spatial orientation. Space and motion discomfort arises when conflicting information is detected among visual, kinesthetic, and vestibular sensory channels. Evidence has supported the claim that patients with anxiety and SMD rely more heavily on visual cues for postural changes.

== Falling in dreams ==
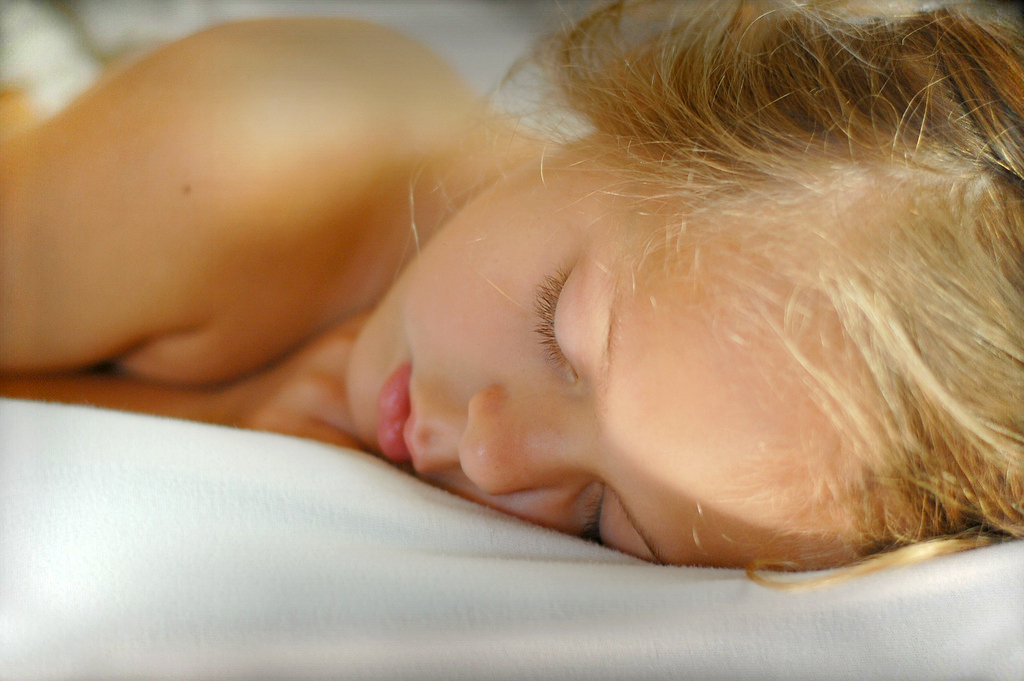
Sleeping child – falling is a common occurrence in dreams.

According to Sigmund Freud's The Interpretation of Dreams, falling dreams fall under the category of "typical dreams", meaning the "dreams which almost everyone has dreamt alike and which we are accustomed to assume must have the same meaning for everyone". In the 2003 study "The Typical Dreams of Canadian University Students", common dreams were investigated by administering a Typical Dreams Questionnaire (TDQ). The results confirmed that typical dreams are consistent over time, region, and gender, and a few themes can be considered almost universal: falling (73.8% prevalence), flying or soaring in the air (48.3%) and swimming (34.3%). In 1967, Saul and Curtis published a paper entitled "Dream Form and Strength of Impulse in Dreams of Falling and Other Dreams of Descent". According to Saul and Curtis, dreams of falling can have various meanings, such as the sensation of falling asleep, the symbolization of a real risk of falling from bed, the repetition of traumatic experiences of falling or sensations of falling from parents’ arms in childhood, birth and delivery, ambition or the renouncement of responsibility, or life experiences such as flying in an airplane. They quote another author, Gutheil (1951), who suggests a range of possible meanings subsumed under the general idea of loss of (mental) equilibrium. These include loss of temper, loss of self-control, yielding, decline of the accepted moral standard or loss of consciousness. Studies performed in recent years on the dream patterns of a group of 685 students attending secondary schools in Milan have concluded that, in dreams, fear is more frequently associated with falling, while happiness is connected with flying, and surprise with suspension and vertical movement (climbing, descent, ladder) content.

== Media treatment ==
In the Alfred Hitchcock film Vertigo, the hero, played by James Stewart, has to resign from the police force after an incident which causes him to develop both acrophobia and vertigo. Early on in the film he faints while climbing a stepladder. There are numerous references throughout the film to fear of heights and falling.

== See also ==
- Accident-proneness
- Acrophobia – Extreme fear of heights
- Fear of flying
- Head for heights – Having no acrophobia or vertigo
- List of phobias – List of fear of different things or objects
- Vertigo – Dizziness with sensation of moving or surrounding objects moving
