= Family studies =

Family studies may refer to:

- Family study, the detection of familial aggregation in genetic epidemiology
- Home economics, the study of domestic science
- Sociology of the family, the study of family structure as a social institution
