= The Worry Trap =

2007 book by Chad LeJeune

- Author: Chad LeJeune
- Language: English
- Subject: Worry, Anxiety, Self-help
- Publisher: New Harbinger Publications
- Publication date: 2007
- Publication place: United States
- ISBN: 978-1-57224-480-1

The Worry Trap: How to Free Yourself from Worry & Anxiety Using Acceptance & Commitment Therapy is a self-help book written by Chad LeJeune in 2007.

== Summary ==
Written for people dealing with chronic worry and anxiety, the book is based on the new principles in what is occasionally termed the Third Wave of Behavioral Therapy using acceptance and commitment therapy (ACT)

The author, a professor of psychology and a founding fellow of the Academy of Cognitive Therapy, uses examples and analogies to illustrate how accepting and identifying one's thoughts "As just mere thoughts" can help one step back and separate oneself emotionally from one's actual thoughts and live more in the present moment, thus decreasing worry and anxiety. An increased awareness of the separate nature of one's self stated as context and one's actual experience stated as content in the book, can reduce worry and stress on a person.

While worrying is a natural emotion for everyone, excessive worrying can interfere with problem-solving and decision-making. The author uses a five-step model approach to guide the reader through learning the skills of acceptance and commitment therapy and applying them to the problem of worry. It starts off by discussing the "fight-or-flight" response and the normal impulse toward controlling thoughts and feelings. Finally, it guides the reader in taking actions directed by values rather than by worry.

The five steps are contained in the acronym LLAMP which is used throughout the book.

- Label "anxious thoughts"
- Let go of control
- Accept and observe thoughts and feelings
- Mindfulness of the present moment
- Proceed in the right direction
