= Exposure (heights) =

Climbing and hiking term

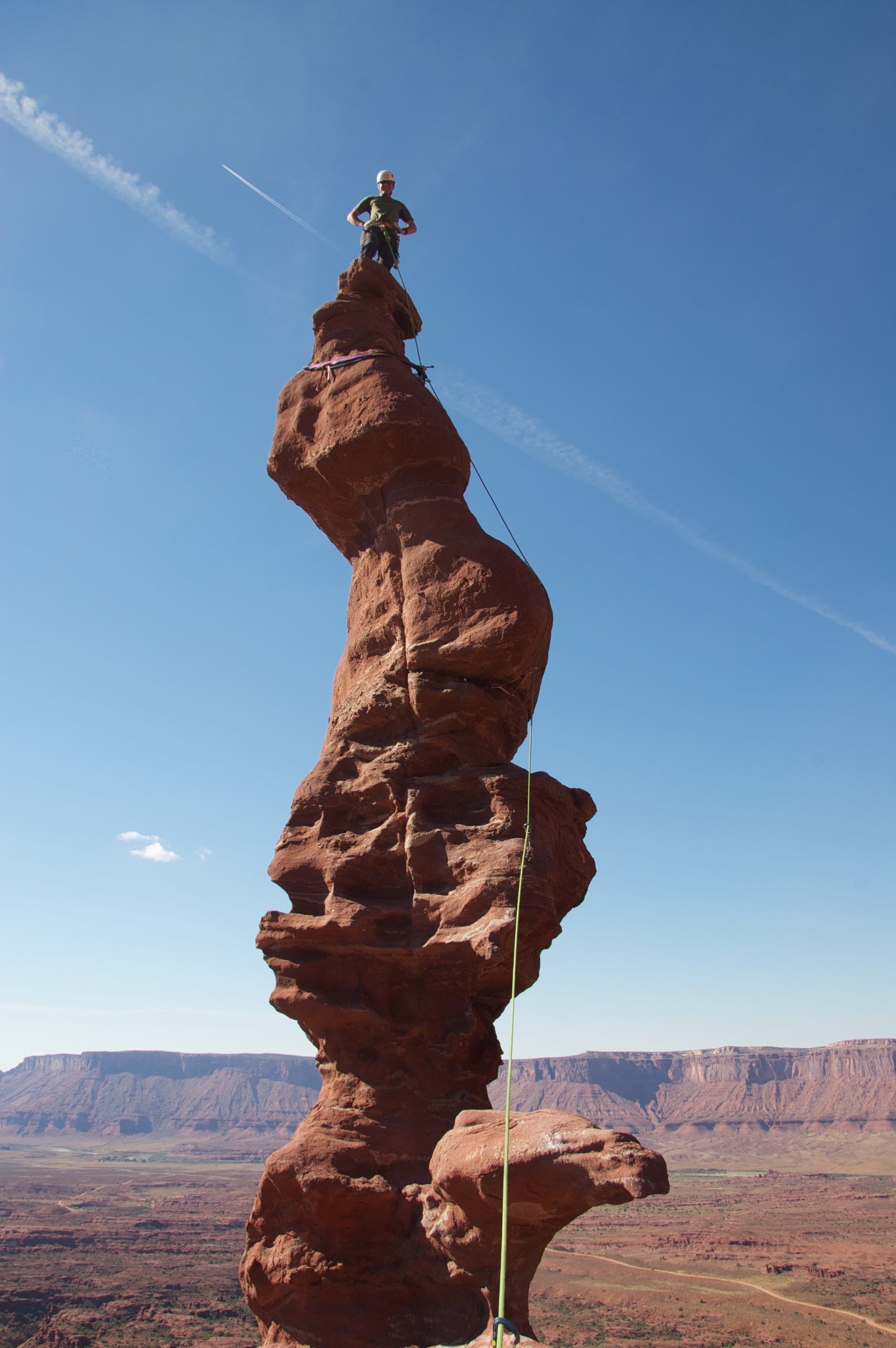
Climber on Ancient Art in Fisher Towers, Moab, Utah, USA. Famous high-exposure route.

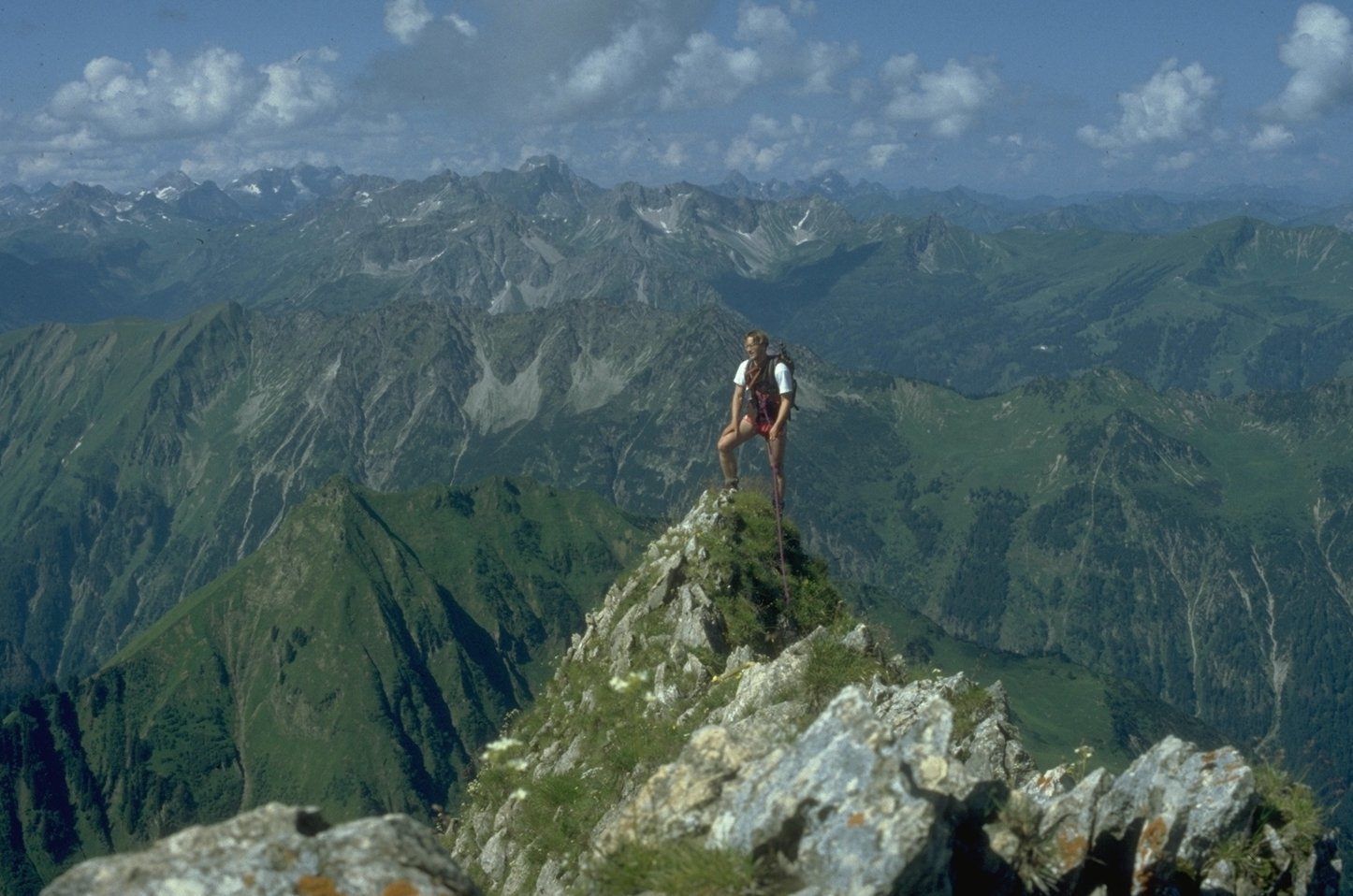
A technically simple, but exposed arete on the Höfats in Bavaria, Germany

Exposure is a climbing and hiking term. Sections of a hiking path or climbing route are described as "exposed" if there is a high risk of injury in the event of a fall because of the steepness of the terrain. If such routes are negotiated without any protection, a false step can result in a serious fall. The negotiation of such routes can cause fear of falling because of the potential danger.

== Definitions ==
What constitutes exposure on a path is fairly obvious, however, an "exposed" location or section of a climbing route is not uniformly or clearly defined in the literature. There are no threshold values, for example, based on the gradient of the terrain, the height of rock faces or the character of a ridge or arête. Authors tend to use their own definition of the terms "exposure" or "exposed" when describing routes, for example:

=== Exposure ===
- "The distance from the climber to where the climber would likely stop in the event of an unprotected fall."
- "Being very far above your last piece of protection or being in a situation in which you are very aware that you are high off the ground or in a remote location."
- "The existence of a formidable amount of empty space along a line drawn between the climber and the center of the earth. Similarly, a climb possessing exposure is said to be "exposed." Exposure is the spice of rock climbing. On an exposed pitch a beginner is likely to be needlessly frightened. The experienced climber, however, with many years of experience to steady his nerves, will be calm and level headed throughout the proceedings until he is asked to try the climb himself."

=== Exposed ===
- "A route that has parts that remind you of how far up you are and with how little gear."
- "The kind of position where you suddenly realise how far away the ground has become; a route or move that takes you into such a position."

== Medical and psychological aspects ==
"Exposed" sections of a path or a route can cause fear as well as serious problems for climbers and walkers in mountainous terrain if they lack a head for heights. However, what may feel exposed to some people, may hardly affect others at all. In critical situations it is therefore necessary, either to turn back or to use a protective measure such as a rope; some paths have fixed ropes, chains, ladders, etc. The anxiety caused by the exposure reduces with habituation, but even experienced climbers often have to get used to heights again at the start of the climbing season.

== See also ==
- Climbing protection
- Head for heights
- Hiking
- Scrambling
- Sure-footedness
- Hazards of outdoor recreation
