= Chronic stress =

Physiological or psychological condition

Chronic stress is the physiological or psychological response induced by a long-term internal or external stressor. The stressor, either physically present or recollected, will produce the same effect and trigger a chronic stress response. There is a wide range of chronic stressors, but most entail relatively prolonged problems, conflicts and threats that people encounter on a daily basis. Several chronic stressors have been identified as associated with disease and mortality including "neighbourhood environment, financial strain, interpersonal stress, work stress and caregiving."

Stress responses, such as the fight or flight response, are fundamental. The complexity of the environment means that it is constantly changing. To navigate the surroundings, we, therefore, need a system that is capable of responding to perceived threatening and harmful situations. The stress response system thus has its role as an adaptive process to restore homeostasis in the body by actively making changes. For instance, the body will involve in an endocrine system response in which corticosteroids are released. This process is known as allostasis, first proposed by Sterling and Eyer (1988). Research has provided considerable evidence to illustrate the stress response as a short-term adaptive system. The immediate effects of stress hormones are beneficial in a particular short-term situation. The system is arguably a protective defense against threats and usually does not pose a health risk.

However, the problem arises when there is a persistent threat. First-time exposure to a stressor will trigger an acute stress response in the body; however, repeated and continuous exposure causes the stressor to become chronic. McEwen and Stellar (1993) argued there is a "hidden cost of chronic stress to the body over long time periods". That is often known as allostatic load. Chronic stress can cause the allostasis system to overstimulate in response to the persistent threat. And such overstimulation can lead to an adverse impact. To illustrate, the long-term exposure to stress creates a high level of these hormones. This may lead to high blood pressure (and subsequently heart disease), damage to muscle tissue, inhibition of growth, and damage to mental health. Chronic stress also relates directly to the functionality and structure of the nervous system, thereby influencing affective and physiological responses to stress. These subsequently can result in damage to the body.

== Historical development ==
Hans Selye (1907–1982), known as the "father of stress", is credited with first studying and identifying stress. He studied stress effects by subjecting lab mice to various physical, antigenic, and environmental stressors, including excessive exercise, starvation, and extreme temperatures. He determined that regardless of the type of stress, the mice exhibited similar physical effects, including thymus gland deterioration and the development of ulcers. Selye then developed his theory of general adaptive syndrome (GAS) in 1936, known today as "stress response". He concluded that humans exposed to prolonged stress could also experience hormonal system breakdown and subsequently develop conditions such as heart disease and elevated blood pressure. Selye considered these conditions to be "diseases of adaptation", or the effects of chronic stress caused by heightened hormonal and chemical levels. His research on acute and chronic stress responses introduced stress to the medical field.

== Physiology ==
Animals exposed to distressing events over which they have no control respond by releasing corticosteroids. The sympathetic branch of the nervous system is activated, also releasing epinephrine and norepinephrine.

Stress has a role in humans as a method of reacting to difficult and possibly dangerous situations. The "fight or flight" response when one perceives a threat helps the body exert energy to fight or run away to live another day. This response is noticeable when the adrenal glands release epinephrine, causing the blood vessels to constrict and heart rate to increase. In addition, cortisol is another hormone that is released under stress and its purpose is to raise the glucose level in the blood. Glucose is the main energy source for human cells and its increase during time of stress is for the purpose of having energy readily available for over active cells.

Chronic stress is also known to be associated with an accelerated loss of telomeres in most but not all studies.

== Response ==
Different types of stressors, the timing (duration) of the stressors, and genetic inherited personal characteristics all influence the response of the hypothalamic–pituitary–adrenal axis to stressful situations. The hypothalamic–pituitary–thyroid axis and other endocrine axes are also involved in the stress response. Those with a wealthy background have a stronger response to stress than those in the lower strata.

Resilience in chronic stress is defined as the ability to deal and cope with stresses in a healthy manner. There are six categories of resources that affect an individual's coping resources:

- Personality (empathy/sympathy, commitment, optimism)
- Ego-related traits (self-esteem, self-confidence, self-control)
- Social connectivity (social network, available support)
- Cultural views (religious beliefs, moral beliefs)
- Behavioral skills (social skills, response to emotions management)
- Other (socioeconomic status, general health)

== Symptoms ==
People may experience anxiety, depression, sadness, anger, irritability, social isolation, headache, menstrual problems, abdominal pain, back pain, muscle pains, and difficulty concentrating.

== Impacts ==
Chronic stress causes the body to stay in a constant state of alertness, despite being in no danger. Extensive studies have provided evidence of the association between "chronic stressors and physical health outcomes" Take caregiving as an example. A review of 37 studies has suggested that dementia caregivers subjected to chronic stress are more susceptible to diseases. Although the connection between stress and health requires continuous research, the existing findings have suggested the potential link between the two.

=== Brain ===
A primary target of stress is the brain. When exposed to stress, it serves as the centre to interpret the stressors and determine the appropriate behavioural and psychological responses. Therefore, exposure to chronic stress will have a direct impact on brain function. For instance, chronic stress inhibits neuron growth inside the hippocampus and prefrontal cortex. The neuronal atrophy in these two structures can lead to hypertrophy in amygdala, responsible for anxiety and stress. In turn, this will lead to an increase of fear and aggression and impairment in learning ability. Memory and decision-making can also be negatively affected. Additionally, chronic stress can suppress neural pathways active in cognition and decision-making, speeding up aging. Also, being chronically stressed worsens the damage caused by a stroke and can lead to sleep disorders due to the overexposure of cortisol.

=== Other systems ===
The alterations in brain function can have a more extensive effect on other body systems. Since chronic stress is due to a wide variety of environmental, nutritional, chemical, pathological, or genetic factors, a wide range of physiological systems can be damaged. Prolonged stress can disturb the immune, digestive, cardiovascular, sleep, and reproductive systems. For example, it was found that:

- Chronic stress reduces resistance of infection and inflammation, and might even cause the immune system to attack itself.
- Stress responses can cause atrophy of muscles and increases in blood pressure. When the stress is chronic, it will lead to sustained elevated blood pressure, impairing the heart functions.

== Measurement ==
The advancement of the scientific study of stress will require better and more accurate measurement of the stress process. However, the complexity of stress has added difficulties to establish consistent and thorough measures.

Chronic stress measures primarily comprise epidemiological studies that look at current experiences within specific life domains. Despite its significance, cumulative stress exposure from past experiences is often compromised due to practical difficulties such as limitations on time. Another potential issue with measuring chronic stress is the validity. In particular for retrospective studies, the validity of the measure is strongly dependent on the accuracy of recollection. Biases and memory decay can contribute to underreporting. Similarly for prospective studies, the validity of the measures will depend on the accuracy of report and detection by the respondent and monitoring agencies.

In regards to measuring stress responses, it can vary from person. It is suggested that individual and environmental contextual factors, such as genes and culture, will contribute to one's vulnerability and resilience to stress. By contrast, protective factors, such as a supportive environment, can strengthen resilience. The two factors are important as they influence the brain's judgment of the stressors. In addition, the interactions of different stressors will lead to cumulative stress exposure. These all together contribute to the differential stress responses. The subjective differences thus may pose challenges for researchers.

Owing to the complexity of measuring stress processes over the lifespan, many researchers decided on measuring more assessable aspects of stress. That includes: "historic exposure, current exposure and responses across different time scale". In many cases, chronic stress is measured by its duration. Yet, there can be considerable variations in the criteria. For example, the Life Events and Difficulties Schedule by Brown and Harris (1978) proposed that chronic difficulty is characterised by a 4-week-cut-off. Alternatively, other researchers may define chronicity with a shorter or longer period. The implication is that studies on chronic stress may not necessarily have a uniform scale for comparison.

== See also ==
- Acute stress reaction
- Perseverative cognition
- Precarious work
- Psychosomatic medicine
- Psychoneuroimmunology
- Stress (biology)
- Stress management
- Why Zebras Don't Get Ulcers
