= 2004 Liechtenstein referendum =

- 4 April 2004

Amending the law on compulsory accident insurance
For	33.74%
Against	66.26%

Funding a new building for the security forces
For	31.77%
Against	68.23%
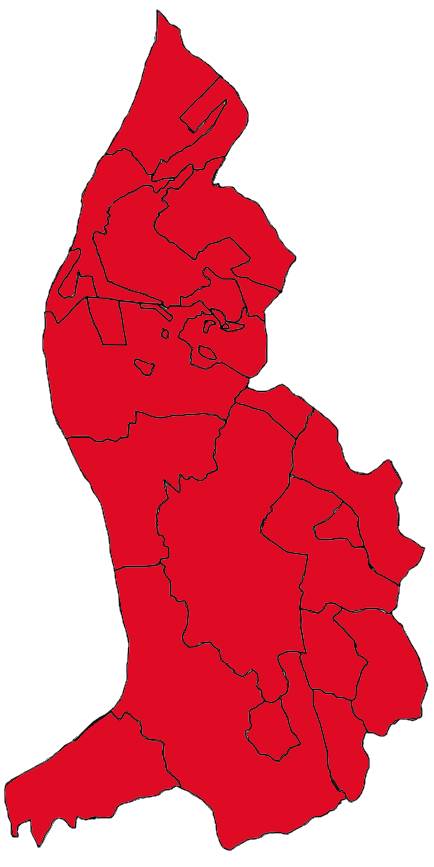
- Results by municipality

A double referendum was held in Liechtenstein on 4 April 2004. Voters were asked whether they approved of amending the law on compulsory accident insurance, which would abolish the government's contribution to domestic accident insurance, and funding a new building for the security forces. Both proposals were rejected by 66 and 68 percent of the voters respectively.

== Results ==
Question	For		Against		Invalid/ blank	Total votes	Registered voters	Turnout	Outcome
Question	Votes	%	Votes	%	Invalid/ blank	Total votes	Registered voters	Turnout	Outcome
Amendment to the law on compulsory accident insurance	3,953	33.74	7,763	66.24	179	11,895	17,190	69.20	Rejected
Funding a new building for the security forces	3,745	31.77	8,042	68.23	108	11,895	17,190	69.20	Rejected
Source: Nohlen & Stöver
