= Perseverative cognition =

Repeated thinking about negative events

Perseverative cognition is a collective term in psychology for continuous thinking about negative events in the past or in the future (e.g. worry, rumination and brooding, but also mind wandering about negative topics).

It has been shown to have physiological effects, such as increased heart rate, blood pressure and cortisol, in daily life as well as under controlled laboratory conditions. Because of these physiological effects, the psychological concept of perseverative cognition helps to explain how psychological stress, such as work stress and marital stress, leads to disease, such as cardiovascular disease.

== Definition ==
The definition of perseverative cognition is: "the repeated or chronic activation of the cognitive representation of one or more psychological stressors". Worry, rumination and all other forms of thoughts (cognition), about stressful events that have happened or might happen, fall under the definition of perseverative cognition. 'Just thinking about your problems, without calling it worrying or rumination', is also perseverative cognition, as is mind wandering when it concerns negative topics. There is a large body of knowledge about the typical constituents of perseverative cognition, such as worry, rumination, repetitive thinking and (negative) mind wandering (reviewed in Watkins, 2008). Perseverative cognition may partly be unconscious. Just as people are not aware of the larger part of their thoughts (cognition), they may also not be aware they continue to think about stressors.

== Perseverative cognition hypothesis ==
The perseverative cognition hypothesis holds that stressful events begin to affect people's health when they think about them repetitively or continuously (that is, 'perseverate cognitively').

Stressful events and the direct physiological responses to them are often too short in duration to cause bodily harm. But people can have continuing thoughts about events from the past, or about potential future events, and the body reacts to the repeated thoughts (perseverative cognition) with prolonged physiological stress responses. Therefore, it is the perseverative cognition, and not the stressors that can eventually lead to disease. In scientific terms, it is said that perseverative cognition is a mediator of the detrimental effects of stress on one's health. Since its publication scientific evidence for this hypothesis has been accumulating.

== Physiological effects and disease ==
Perseverative cognition is involved with a "stress-disease link". Further, it is the thinking about the stress, or rather the obsessing over it, that establishes a link between stress and disease. Perseverative cognition also focuses on the effects that worrying over anticipated events have on the physical body and mind. This could suggest that obsessive worrying over past events or the future could lead to physical issues.

There are some physical evidences of the effects of perseverative cognition, as noted in an analysis article. The article found that cortisol levels, as well as the average heart rates of individuals, were higher when perseverative cognitive processes were present. Another article says that "worrying about stressful events increases the total amount of time that stress has a 'wear and tear' effect on the human body." Studies have been done that show links between cognitive perseverance and increased heart rates. The consistent, ruminating thoughts circulating in one's mind could lead to physical responses.

In another article, it is discussed that perseverative cognition increases heart rate, and also impacts parts of the brain, notably in the prefrontal and amygdala areas. There is a connection between the brain and the heart when it comes to perseverative cognition. When present, it impacts not only mental facilities, but also physical components. One article describes the physical components as a response to the thoughts, "as if the individual were facing an external stressor". The article also talks about how obsessive thoughts of worry lead to greater depression. Cognitive perseverance leads to multiple issues, ranging from mood to heart rate.

Cognitive perseverance not only impacts mental and physical processing, but it also has the possibility of impacting sleep, as explored in one article. In this article, the impact of obsessive worrying regarding jobs, therefore creating perseverative cognition, on sleep was explored. They found that there was a correlation between excessive job centered perseverative cognition and a lack of good sleep. Perseverative cognition impacts several parts of life. Another article talks about how poor sleep could happen when one had perseverative cognition. The article uses the term mind wandering to talk about "persistent and repetitive" thoughts and correlates with other mental disorders. Perseverative cognition can affect more than physical components, as stated earlier. The same article also talked about how mental rigidity ties in with perseverative cognition and impacts individuals in multiple ways.

In addition, perseverative cognition has potential to make other mental illnesses worse. In another article, on its effect on PTSD, it was found that with severe PTSD and the perseverative cognition, it correlated with less recovery regarding cardiovascular disease.

== See also ==
- Health psychology
- Metacognitive therapy
- Chronic stress
- Mindfulness-based stress reduction
- Unconscious cognition
