= Memory and decision-making =

The memory system plays a key role in the decision-making process because individuals constantly choose among alternative options. Due to the volume of decisions made, much of the decision-making process is unconscious and automatic. Information about how a decision is made is remembered and used for future decisions. Although memory is susceptible to biases, it plays a vital role in forming preferences and differentiating between choices.

== Preferences-as-memory approach ==
The preferences-as-memory (PAM) framework is a model that maps the role of memory in decision-making. It suggests that decisions are chosen based on the retrieval of relevant knowledge from memory. This knowledge includes information from both previous identical and similar situations. The model assumes that there never is one precise optimal choice due to the complexity of the memory system.

=== Classical Models ===
Classic models of judgment and decision-making assume that all individuals abide to a given set of assumptions when making a decision. Humans are believed to have stable preferences that follow the rules of continuity and precision, and so we will make consistent choices regardless of the influence of any internal or external factors. These assumptions have been challenged. A growing body of evidence suggests that our preferences are constructed for each novel occurrence of a situation and thus are not as stringent as previously thought. The PAM framework diverges from classical models and views our preferences as volatile and subject to change.

=== Impact of Memory on Decisions ===
==== Memory Integration ====
Memory integration dictates one's preferences for a given alternative. The PAM model suggests that preferences are formed when individuals retrieve from memory a set of queries regarding the attributes of the alternative choices. These queries are believed to be an automatic, unconscious process. Many individuals think largely in terms of emotions when asked to make a decision, and so the way in which a question is posed as well as the manner in which it is asked impacts the decision-making process. If asked to choose where to go for dinner, one will select a series of possible restaurants, consider each option, and determine the positive attributes of each. The restaurant chosen will be the one with the greatest number of positive attributes.

This choice depends on the order in which one evaluates the benefits of each option and whether one considers the negative rather than the positive possibilities. The phrasing of a question also affects this query process. For example, "the car tapped the pole" versus "the car crashed into the pole." The framing of a question primes different components of the memory system and has the ability to reconstruct our memories. Memory is not an event that occurs in isolation, but is integrated and thus influenced by the goals of the decision-maker, the questions posed, and an infinite amount of internal and external factors.

==== Inhibition and Memory Reactivity ====
Memory for events is constantly changing in both its short-term accessibility and how the content is stored long-term. A question posed before giving one's preference can influence the short-term accessibility of memory, as can anchoring effects. Questions posed also can have significant long-term effects, can reconstruct memory, and can predict or influence behavior. For example, students who answered affirmative to the question of whether they would vote in the upcoming election increased their voting behavior even though the question was asked months beforehand.

The memory system suffers from inhibition. This is why it is difficult to hold two different phone numbers in working memory at the same time. Although it may seem that inhibition impedes our memory system, it allows humans to focus on the relevant details and ignore irrelevant ones when required to make quick decisions. Earlier queries can establish preferences that inhibit responses to later queries. A person who is presented with two items and asked to choose between the two is more likely to be choose the item that was presented first. Order matters because inhibition influences both our memory and preferences so that new information competes with older information in regards to memory space and memory associations.

==== Hierarchical Structure of Memory ====
The hierarchical structure of the memory system is a construct of elaborate categories that people create to classify objects. Instead of memory connections between all knowledge, we have connections between various concept nodes. According to Sherman's study, it shows that when given B object, people can form A object as B object provides relevant sample space that leads people to make judgement. For example, a person who is asked to retrieve a bird from memory thinks first of the concept node of all animals, then of all animals that can fly, and finally of a bird that is the most stereotypical of the class; for example, a robin. A penguin would be less likely to be retrieved because a penguin is less typical of the class. This is the reason why it is more difficult to make decisions about abstract and non-hierarchical concepts like time and money. It is easy to envision a pencil but more difficult to decide what to do with a sum of money or how to spend the next three hours of free time.

== Implicit Memory and Decision-making ==
Implicit memory is a form of long-term memory not involved in conscious awareness. A process stored in implicit memory may be easy to carry out but difficult to verbalize. For example, although we can ride a bicycle even after a decade-long hiatus, it is difficult to explain to another individual how to do so. Evidence suggests that implicit memory, especially in the realm of advertising, may impact decision-making.

People, as consumers, are surrounded by advertisements that promote businesses' products and services with the goal that we choose theirs over that of another competing brand. These advertisements are believed to become an internalized form of implicit memory in which, with no conscious awareness, people favor one brand over the others. Advertisements may create perceived biases that allows us to choose that the product in our memory system and with which we are familiar, whether consciously or implicitly. The reasons for our preferences may reside in implicit memory and thus be unknown to us.

=== Priming ===
The priming effect is another key aspect of how memory influences decisions. Priming activates a certain memory node that results in easier accessibility later on. A recent study examined the impact of playing certain types of music in a store that sells wine. German wines were sold at a higher rate when German music was played, and French wines sold better when French music was played. This effect resulted in a quarter of the variance in wine sales. Priming increases the accessibility of a memory and may be the reason we chose one alternative over the other.

==== Classical Conditioning ====
Classical Conditioning involves three stages. First, it happens when people naturally respond (unconditioned response) to a stimulus (unconditioned stimulus). For example, a dog starts salivation when food is presented. Second, it is the stage of acquisition in which an object is presented as a neutral stimulus, a stimulus like a ringtone that does not naturally elicit the unconditioned response, and the object will associate them together after a few repetitions. The unconditioned stimulus still elicits the unconditioned response, but now the neutral stimulus can elicit the same response. Thus, we now have a conditioned stimulus and conditioned response. Following acquisition, the third stage is when the unconditioned stimulus will not elicit the unconditioned response, but the neutral stimulus now will become a conditioned stimulus that can elicit the unconditioned response. Take dog as an example to explain the effect of the third stage. A dog is trained to eat (unconditioned response) after the bell rings (conditioned stimulus). Then, that dog will continue to get up and start eating when the bell rings because his memory is being revoked when hearing the bell rings.

== Memory, Environment, and Decision-making ==
The event of a person having placed an item into memory implies that the person has had at least one encounter with that item. The memory system behaves optimally when memories that are more likely to be used are more easily retrievable than less-likely memories. Memory is influenced by practice effects, the concept that greater practice with an item results in easier retrieval; retention effects, which means that memories grow less likely to be retrieved as a longer period of time passes, and spacing effects, in which memories are more easily recalled if they are encoded into memory over a longer time interval.

It is plausible that the environmental structure, which influences our memory structure, impacts how we create preferences and make decisions. Evidence suggests that the memory system is organized in a way that is adapted to the structure of the environment. We are thus able to predict when we will need a certain memory even after controlling for practice, retention, and spacing effects.

== Affect and memory ==
Memory and emotion, or "affect", are closely related and impact each other simultaneously. One's mood determines the thoughts he or she experiences as well as the memories that are recalled. An experiment by Rimmele shows that people are more likely to remember negative pictures than neutral pictures, and they have more confidence in emotional pictures than neutral pictures. Emotion triggers memories which in turn triggers reactions. According to Ledoux in 1996, those with phobias automatically react to threatening stimuli and situations even though that fear can be controlled by using psychotherapy, a psychological technique that rely on verbal communication such as Systematic desensitization. It is also possible for phobias to return when a strong threatening stimulus shows up again in which shows that fear rekindles the memory from the past experience which cause natural reaction.

Another common example is that sufferers of depression find it difficult to recall happy memories because they are overwhelmed with negative thoughts. According to Reevy et al., (2010)“The patients have poorer memory overall and selectively recall more negative than positive information (known as emotional memory bias)”(p. 371). We recall from memory the information that reflects our current state. When a memory is tied with emotion, people have a tendency to remember more compared to memories of daily events. Emotional memory can trigger behaviors. As an example, when couples break up, they may cry over their love song when played on the radio. It is because there is a strong emotional memory connected to the song; tears may automatically run down on the face, and some even choose to refuse to listen to the song as a result then. Memory has been shown to influence decision-making behavior and, considering the reciprocal connection between the two, affect can as well.
