= Head for heights =

Having no acrophobia or vertigo

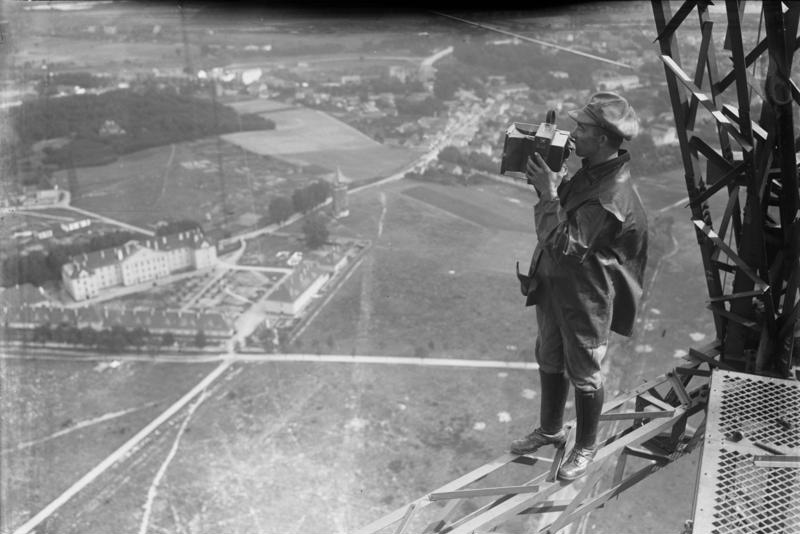
Press photographer on the transmission tower in Königs Wusterhausen, Germany, 1932

To have a head for heights means that one has no acrophobia (irrational fear of heights), and is also not particularly prone to fear of falling or suffering from vertigo (the spinning sensation that can be triggered, for example, by looking down from a high place).

A head for heights is frequently cited as a requirement when mountain hiking or climbing for a particular route, as well as when paragliding and hang-gliding. It is needed for certain jobs, such as for wind turbine technicians, chimney sweeps, roofers, steeplejacks and window cleaners. Mohawk ironworkers have worked for generations erecting New York City skyscrapers, but the idea that all Mohawk people have an innate skill for doing so is a myth.

Unlike acrophobia, a natural fear of falling is normal. When one finds oneself in an exposed place at a great height, one normally feels one’s own posture as unstable. A normal fear of falling can generate feelings of anxiety, as well as autonomic symptoms like outbreaks of sweat. In someone with acrophobia, however, the fear of falling arises in situations that would not affect most people, and the fear can be much stronger and out of proportion to the situation.

== Causes of fear of falling ==
There are logical biological causes of fear of falling. Firstly, there is the innate so-called "cliff edge phenomenon", whereby even toddlers, as well as many animals, avoid large drops, even without having previously had a bad experience.

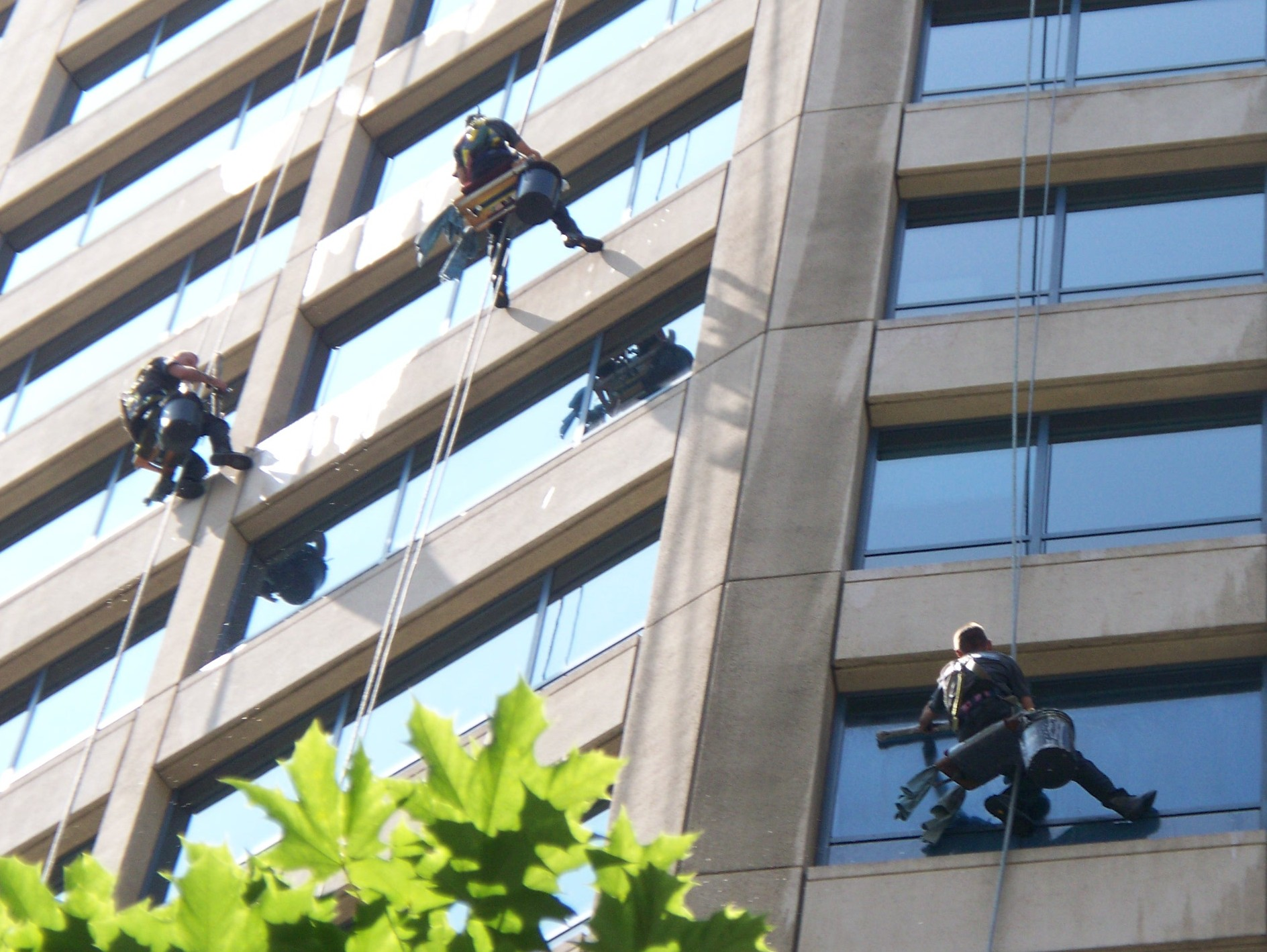
Three high-rise window cleaners at work

Vertigo is a separate condition, caused by a destabilization of the posture. When it occurs at height, it is the result of too large a distance from the eyes to the nearest visible solid object and is referred to as "distance vertigo" or "height vertigo". In order to see the object, the head starts to sway imperceptibly, and "location reflex" then causes the body to sway with it. At the same time, the body stabilizes its sense of position using the periphery of the retina, but if the person looks down they lose this stabilizing factor. This physiological swaying is normally counteracted by the body's vestibular system and proprioceptive sense. However, if the person's sense of balance has previously been damaged, the risk of falling is increased.

== Literature ==
- Martin Roos: Wenn die Höhe zur Hölle wird. In: DAV Panorama 1/2008, ISSN 1437-5923
- Pepi Stückl/Georg Sojer: Bergsteigen: Lehrbuch für alle Spielarten des Bergsteigens, Bruckmann, Munich, 1996, ISBN 3-7654-2859-0
