= Worry =

Thoughts, images, emotions, and actions of a pessimistic nature

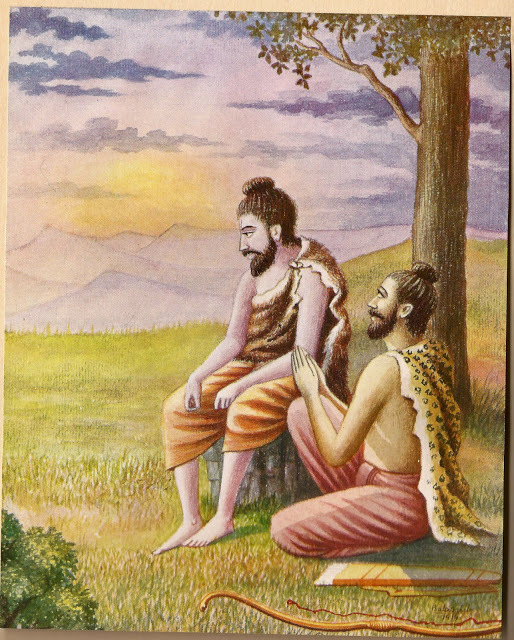
A depiction of Rama in the Ramayana. Worried about his wife Sita, he is consoled by his brother Lakshmana.

Worrying is the mental distress or agitation resulting from anxiety, usually coming from a place of anticipatory fear (terror) or fear coming from a present threat (horror). With more understanding of the situation, worry becomes concern, the recognition of a future outcome that could be troubling, without necessarily having fear in that outcome.

== Definition ==
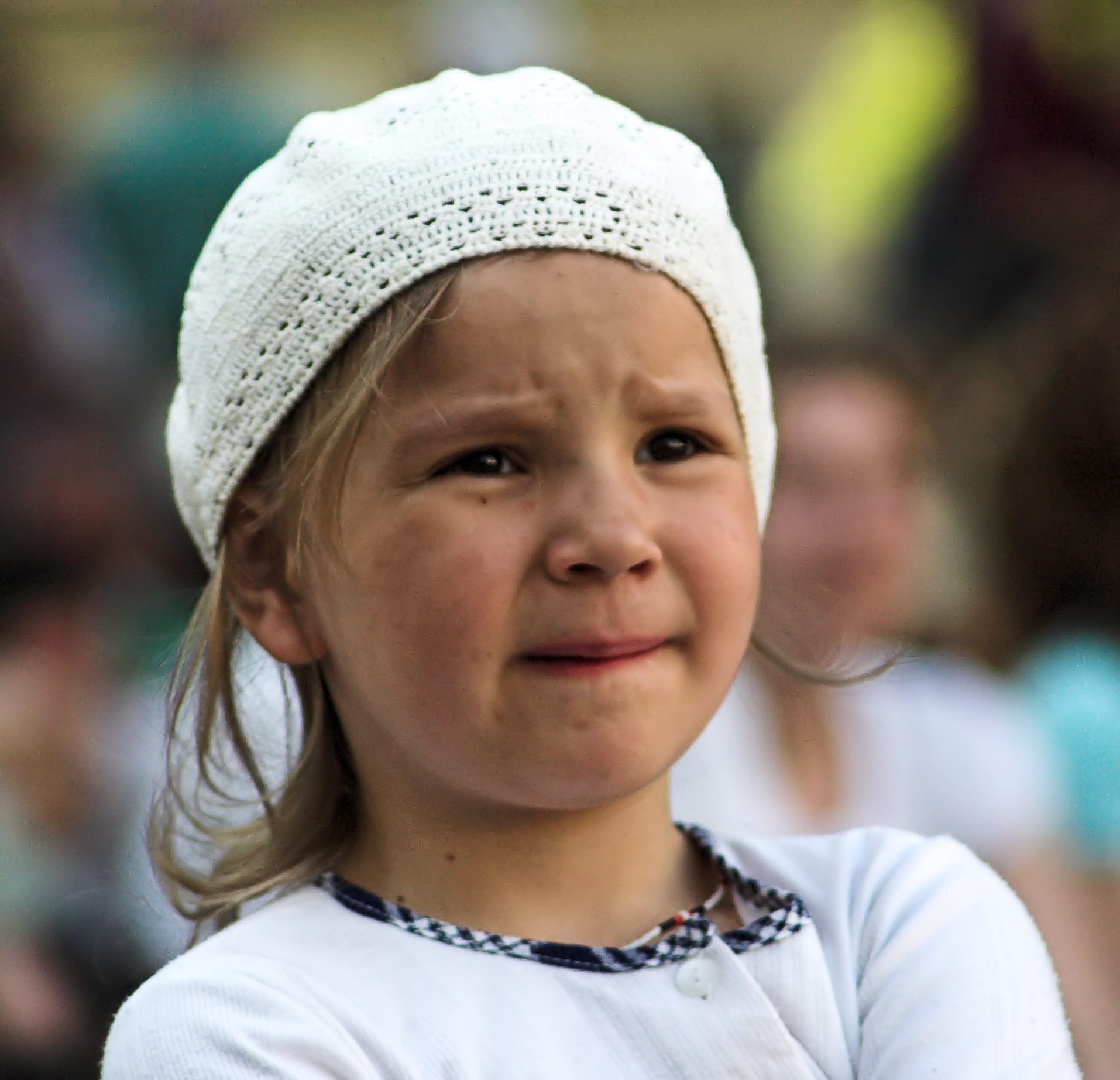
A young girl looking worried

Worry is a category of perseverative cognition, i.e., a continuous thinking about negative events in the past or in the future. Worry has been described as a chain of thoughts and images that are negatively affect-laden and relatively uncontrollable, and its content typically concerns future events whose outcomes are uncertain but carry the possibility of one or more negative outcomes. Reported proneness to worry varies continuously across the general population, without a sudden discontinuity between ordinary and excessive worry. It is a natural response to anticipated future problems. Excessive worry is a primary diagnostic feature of generalized anxiety disorder, but also is pervasive in other psychological disorders, like schizophrenia.

Most people experience short-lived periods of worry in their lives without incident; indeed, a mild amount of worrying has positive effects, if it prompts people to take precautions (e.g., fastening their seat belt or buying insurance) or avoid risky behaviors (e.g., angering dangerous animals, or binge drinking), but with excessive worrisome people they overestimate future dangers in their assessments and in its extremities tend to magnify the situation as a dead end which results in stress. Overestimation happens because analytic resources are a combination of external locus of control, personal experience and belief fallacies. Chronically worried individuals are also more likely to lack confidence in their problem solving ability, perceive problems as threats, become easily frustrated when dealing with a problem, and are pessimistic about the outcome of problem-solving efforts.

Seriously anxious people find it difficult to control their worry and typically experience symptoms like restlessness, fatigue, difficulty in concentrating, irritability, muscle tension and sleep disturbance.

== Theories ==
Mental state in terms of challenge level and skill level, according to Csikszentmihalyi's flow model. (Click on a fragment of the image to go to the appropriate article)

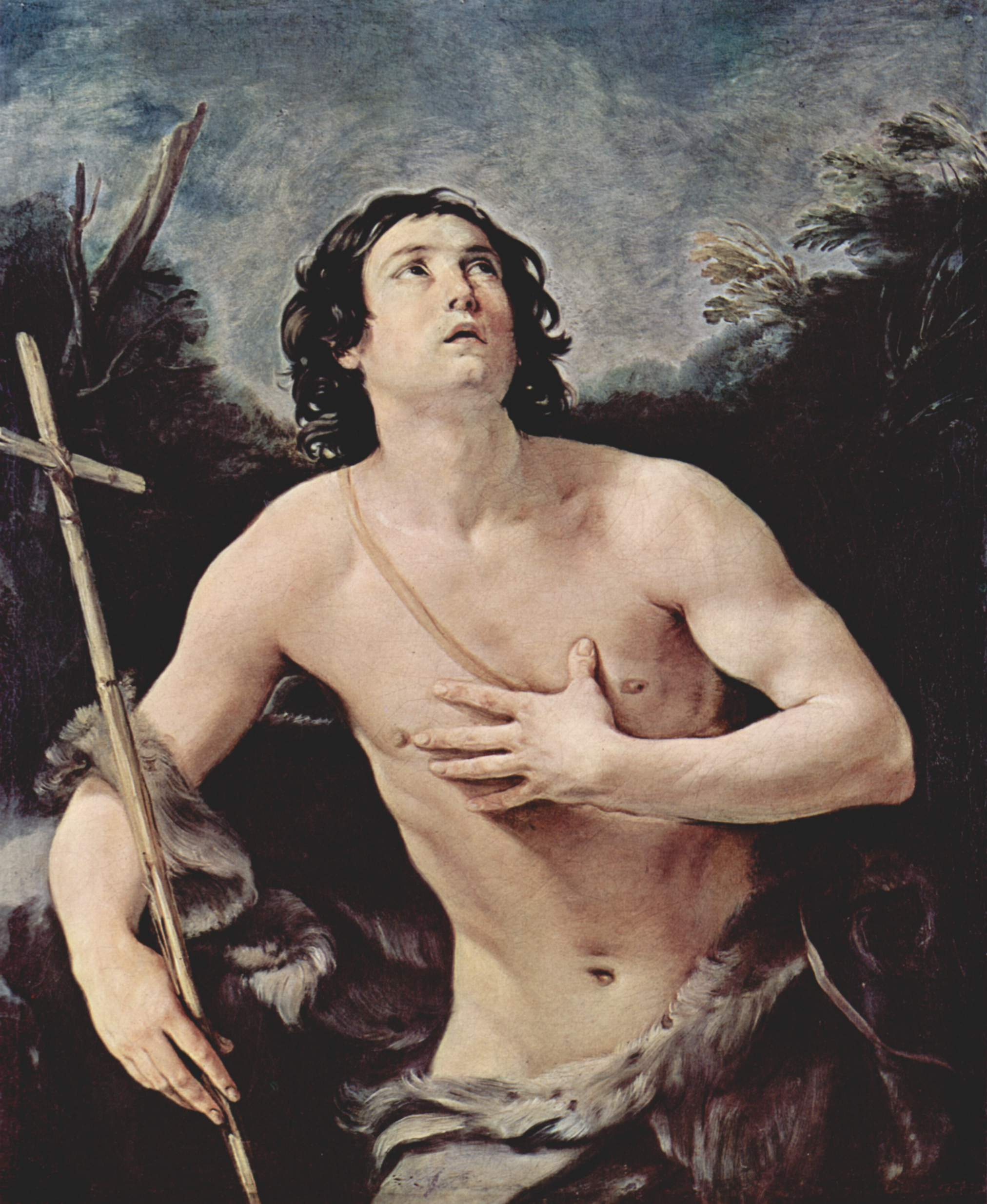
Guido Reni's 17th-century painting of John the Baptist depicts anguish and worry.

=== Avoidance model ===
The avoidance model of worry (AMW) theorizes that worry is a verbal linguistic, thought based activity, which arises as an attempt to inhibit vivid mental imagery and associated somatic and emotional activation. This inhibition precludes the emotional processing of fear that is theoretically necessary for successful habituation and extinction of feared stimuli. Worry is reinforced as a coping technique due to the fact that most worries never actually occur, leaving the worrier with a feeling of having successfully controlled the feared situation, without the unpleasant sensations associated with exposure. Noteworthy, studies also show that visual worry, i.e. worrying that occurs in visual modality, is also associated with increased anxiety and other psychopathology symptoms.

=== Cognitive model ===
This model explains pathological worry to be an interaction between involuntary (bottom-up) processes, such as habitual biases in attention and interpretation favoring threat content, and voluntary (top-down) processes, such as attentional control. Emotional processing biases influence the probability of threat representations into the awareness as intruding negative or positive thoughts. At a pre-conscious level, these processes influence the competition among mental representations in which some correspond to the assertive power of worry with impaired cognitive process and others to the preventive power of worry with attentional control or exhaustive vigilance. The biases determine threatening degree and nature of worry content the worrier attempts to resolve the perceived threat and the redirection of anticipations, responses and coping in such situations.

There are some who respond to mental representations in an uncertain or ambiguous state in regard to the stressful or upsetting event. In this state the worrier is held in a perpetual state of worry. This is because availability of an overwhelming number (maybe 2 or 3, depending upon the worry-prone individual) of possibilities of outcomes which can be generated, it puts the worrier in a threatening crisis and they focus their attentional control voluntarily on the potential negative outcomes, whereas others engage in a constructive problem solving manner and in a benign approach rather than to engage with heightened anticipation on the possible negative outcome.

== Philosophy ==
Greek thinkers such as stoic philosopher Epictetus and Seneca advised against worry. Albert Ellis, the creator of Rational Emotive Behavior Therapy, was inspired by the Stoics' therapeutic ideas.

== Religion ==
=== Christianity ===
The biblical word used in Hebrew for worry (Hebrew: דָּאַג, daag) regards worry as a combined form of fear and sorrow which affects nephesh, the totality of our being. The bible takes a fortitude-strengthening approach regarding worrying, e.g., Psalm 94:

In the multitude of my anxieties within me, your comforts delight my soul.

In the New Testament, the Gospel of Matthew encourages:

And can any of you by worrying add a single hour to your span of life? ... So do not worry about tomorrow, for tomorrow will bring worries of its own. Today's trouble is enough for today.

The Greek word used for worry in Matthew is merimnaō, which means to be anxious about, or to be troubled with cares.

St. Paul writes to the Philippian church, "There is no need to worry" and in the pastoral epistles, 2 Timothy 1:7 emboldens:

For God did not give us a spirit of cowardice, but rather a spirit of power and of love and of self-discipline.

Similarly James 1:2-4 motivates us to face trials of any kind with joy, because such trials produce endurance (strength and courage). Further Saint Peter reveals his understanding of healthy living in Second Peter 1:3,5–7:

We have a sure hope ... this is a cause of great joy for us.

=== Hinduism ===
A late Indian spiritual teacher Meher Baba stated that worry is caused by desires and can be overcome through detachment:

Worry is the product of feverish imagination working under the stimulus of desires ... (It) is a necessary resultant of attachment to the past or to the anticipated future, and it always persists in some form or other until the mind is completely detached from everything.

== Management ==
The worry system is activated from exposure to a potential triggering event, traumatic experience or vulnerability, this brings worrisome thoughts and feelings which bring about physical stress reactions and response to avoid worrisome behavior, to ensure allostasis. But under the crisis this activity feeds back into the first worrisome thoughts and feelings which generates and strengthens the vicious worry cycle. Relaxation, risk assessment, worry exposure, exercises such as yoga, and behavior prevention may be effective in curbing excessive worry, a chief feature of generalized anxiety disorder. Cognitive behavioral techniques hasn't branched out enough to address the problem holistically but therapy can control or diminish worry.

== See also ==
- Anxiety
- Attitude (psychology)
- Fear
- Interoceptive exposure
- Mental toughness
- Neuroticism
- Panic attack
- Rumination (psychology)
