= Measures of conditioned emotional response =

In experimental psychology the term conditioned emotional response refers to a phenomenon that is seen in classical conditioning after a conditioned stimulus (CS) has been paired with an emotion-producing unconditioned stimulus (US) such as electric shock. The conditioned emotional response is usually measured through its effect in suppressing an ongoing response.

== Example ==
For example, a rat first learns to press a lever through operant conditioning. Classical conditioning follows: in a series of trials the rat is exposed to a CS, often a light or a noise. Each CS is followed by the US, an electric shock. As an association between the CS and US develops, the rat slows or stops its lever pressing when the CS comes on. The slower the rat presses, the stronger its conditioned emotional response, or "fear."

Researchers working on theories of conditioning often use the conditioned emotional response to measure the strength of the association between CS and US. They use the suppression ratio to quantify this strength.

== Suppression ratio ==
The suppression ratio equals the number of responses made during a CS divided by the number of responses made during the CS plus the number of responses made during a period just before the CS that has the same duration as the CS:

$SR = D / (D+B)$.

Where SR = suppression Ratio, D = responding during CS and B = responding before CS.

- If SR = 0, there were no responses during the CS and conditioning is strong.
- If SR = 1/2, the response rate did not change when the CS was presented and there is no evidence of conditioning
- It would be unusual for SR to be greater than 1/2. This would mean the subject responded faster during the CS than before; this could happen if the US were something positive, like food, instead of shock.
