= Shula Marks =

South African historian (born 1938)

Shula Eta Marks OBE, FBA
- Born: Shula Eta Winokur; 14 October 1938 (age 88); Cape Town, South Africa
- Education: University of Cape Town, University of London
- Occupations: Author, scholar, journalist
- Employer(s): School of Oriental and African Studies, University of London
- Known for: Divided Sisterhood
- Spouse: Isaac Marks
- Children: 2

Shula Eta Marks, OBE, FBA (born 14 October 1938, in Cape Town) is a South African-British historian and author. She is a emeritus professor of history at the School of Oriental and African Studies of the University of London. She has written at least seven books and a WHO monograph on Health and Apartheid, concerning experiences and public health issues in South Africa. Some of her current public health work involves the fight against the spread of HIV/AIDS in contemporary South Africa.

She was born Shula Eta Winokur in Cape Town and was educated at the University of Cape Town (BA) and the University of London (PhD). She also holds three honorary doctorates. She is married to Professor Isaac Marks, emeritus professor at King's College London. She has two children: Lara, a historian of medicine, and Raphael, an architect.

== Career ==
- Lecturer in the history of Africa, Institute of Commonwealth Studies and SOAS (jointly) 1963–1976
- Reader in the history of Southern Africa, 1976–84; Professor of Commonwealth history 1984–93 and Director, 1983–1993, Institute of Commonwealth Studies
- Hon DLitt, University of Cape Town, 1994
- Hon DSocSci, University of Natal, 1996
- Professor of history of Southern Africa SOAS 1993–2001 (professor emeritus 2001–, honorary fellow 2005)
- Douglas Southall Freeman professor, University of Richmond 2005
- Hon DLitt et Phil, University of Johannesburg, 2012

== Other positions and honours ==
- Consultant, World Health Organization, 1977–1980
- President, African Studies Association of the United Kingdom (ASAUK), 1978–1979
- Chair, World University Southern African Scholarships Committee, 1981–1992
- Council Society for Protection of Science and Learning (now Council for Assisting Refugee Academics (CARA)), 1983–2013 (chair 1993–2004)
- Governor, Institute of Development Studies, University of Sussex, 1988–1991
- Chair, The International Records Management Trust, 1989–2004
- Advisory Council on Public Records, 1989–1994
- Governing Body Queen Elizabeth House Oxford, 1991–1994
- Commonwealth Scholarships Commission, 1992–1998
- Fellow of the British Academy (FBA), 1995
- OBE, 1996
- 7th Annual Bindoff lecture, "Rewriting South African history, or, The hunt for Hintsa's head", Queen Mary and Westfield College (University of London), delivered 12 March 1996
- Humanities Research Board 1997–98, a Non-Departmental Government Body of the British Research Council
- Arts and Humanities Research Council (AHRB), 1998–2000
- Vice-president, Royal African Society, 1999–
- Distinguished Africanist Award, African Studies Association of the UK, 2002
- Trustee, Council Member, Canon Collins Educational & Legal Assistance Trust, 2004–2014

== Publications ==
- Reluctant Rebellion: An Assessment of the 1906–08 Disturbance in Natal (1970)
- Economy and Society in Preindustrial South Africa (edited jointly with Anthony Atmore, 1980)
- Industrialisation and Social Change in South Africa: African class formation, culture, and consciousness, 1870–1930 (Edited jointly with Richard Rathbone, 1982), London and New York: Longman, 383 pages
- WHO monograph on Health and Apartheid, co-authored, 1983
- Ambiguities of Dependence in South Africa: Class, Nationalism and the State in Twentieth Century Natal (1986)
- The Politics of Race, Class and Nationalism in Twentieth Century South Africa (edited jointly with Stanley Trapido, 1987)
- Not Either an Experimental Doll: The Separate Worlds of Three South African Women (1987)
- Divided Sisterhood: Race, Class and Gender in the South African Nursing Profession (1994)
