= Joseph Biederman =

American psychiatrist (1947–2023)

- Born: September 29, 1947; Prague, Czechoslovakia
- Died: January 5, 2023 (aged 75); Boston, Massachusetts, USA
- Education: M.D., cum laude, Buenos Aires University Medical School, Buenos Aires, Argentina 1971; Rotating internship, Hadassah University Hospital, Hebrew University, Jerusalem, Israel; Resident in Psychiatry, Hadassah University Hospital, Hebrew University, Jerusalem, Israel; Research Fellow, Jerusalem Mental Health Center, Hebrew University, Jerusalem, Israel; Clinical Fellow in Psychiatry, Massachusetts General Hospital, Harvard Medical School, Boston, MA
- Known for: Creating the first pediatric psychopharmacology clinic Studies of the nature, diagnosis and treatment of attention deficit hyperactivity disorder, mood and anxiety disorders in children and adults
- Medical career
- Profession: Psychiatry
- Institutions: Massachusetts General Hospital; Harvard Medical School
- Sub-specialties: Child and Adolescent Psychiatry
- Research: Child and Adolescent Psychiatry; Attention Deficit Hyperactivity Disorder in Adults

Joseph Biederman (29 September 1947 – 5 January 2023) was an American academic psychiatrist. He was Chief of the Clinical and Research Programs in Pediatric Psychopharmacology and Adult ADHD at the Massachusetts General Hospital and a professor of psychiatry at Harvard Medical School.

From 2019 to 2022, his citation metrics placed him in the top 0.01% of scientists across all fields. His research was and is highly cited: Biederman had a lifetime h-index of 121, which is one of the highest in the field of mental health. These metrics indicate that his publications have had a substantial impact on the field. Although his biggest focus was on attention-deficit/hyperactivity disorder (ADHD) in youth and adults, he also studied obsessive-compulsive disorder, bipolar disorder, tic disorders, depression, and substance use disorders in youth. Due to this work, he is regarded as the father of pediatric psychopharmacology. He attracted controversy and public attention for his role in promoting the diagnosis of childhood bipolar disorder and his financial ties to the pharmaceutical industry.

== Awards and honors ==
In 1995, Biederman was inducted into the CHADD Hall of Fame. He was awarded the 2021 World Federation of ADHD Gold Medal Award for lifetime contributions to the field of ADHD. In 2023, he was awarded the Lifetime Achievement Award of the American Professional Society of ADHD and Related Disorders. After his death, his contributions to ADHD clinical practice and research were memorialized by naming the Lifetime Achievement Award in his honor. During his lifetime, he was awarded over 15 million dollars in grant funding from the National Institutes of Health to support his research into the nature, causes and treatment of mental health disorders in youth.

== Career ==
Described as "one of the world's most influential child psychiatrists", Biederman published hundred of papers on attention-deficit hyperactivity disorder (ADHD) and ranks as one of the most-cited researchers on the subject. He was one of the first to systematically study the co-occurrence of ADHD with mood, anxiety and substance use disorders. His work showed that these disorders were common among ADHD patients. Biederman also completed the first large scale case-control family studies of ADHD.

Biederman also led studies concluding that a substantial minority of children diagnosed with ADHD actually had pediatric bipolar disorder. This theory was proposed at a time when it was unheard for young children to be diagnosed with bipolar disorder, which is characterized by severe mood swings. According to the New York Times, between 1994 and 2003, there was a controversial 40-fold increase in the diagnosis of pediatric bipolar disorder.

Although Biederman was one of the first to systematically study childhood onset bipolar disorder, the existence of bipolar disorder in childhood had been shown by many prior reports. In 1986, Weller et al. searched the literature of case reports describing children with severe psychiatric symptoms. Of 157 such cases, 24% had childhood onset bipolar disorder. This review suggested that juvenile mania may be common among referred children with severe psychopathology but that it may be difficult to diagnose.

This early work led to systematic studies by Biederman and others which showed that childhood onset bipolar disorder was more common than originally believed, especially among children with attention deficit hyperactivity disorder or conduct disorder. Childhood onset bipolar disorder is now recognized by the American Academy of Child and Adolescent Psychiatry as a valid disorder as indicated by the publication of a practice parameter for diagnosing and treating bipolar disorder in children.

For many years the secondary prevention of bipolar disorder had been stymied by diagnostic uncertainties, especially its diagnostic criterion overlap with attention deficit hyperactivity disorder (ADHD). These uncertainties made it difficult for clinicians to identify children with the disorder leading to delays and failures to treat the disorder. To deal with this problem, Biederman began a program of research aimed at clarifying the diagnosis and better understanding its etiologic links with other disorders. In an initial study, he and his mentees examined the prevalence and clinical features of childhood onset bipolar disorder in clinically referred children. The sample consisted of all children, 12 years or younger, who had been consecutively referred to Biederman's pediatric psychopharmacology clinic since 1991. Sixteen percent of 262 consecutive referrals met criteria for bipolar disorder. Their bipolar disorder was chronic, severe and impairing in multiple domains of functioning (psychopathology, cognitive impairment and social disability). All but one of the bipolar disorder children had a severe ADHD syndrome prior to the onset of mania. Notably, symptom overlap analyses showed that this high rate of comorbidity was not due to diagnostic criteria shared by the two disorders.

Using the same sample, Biederman evaluated the ability of the Child Behavior Checklist (CBCL) to identify children with bipolar disorder. His results showed excellent correspondence between the clinical scales of the CBCL and DSM-III-R diagnoses of bipolar disorder. The excellent correspondence between clinical diagnoses and CBCL scales reflecting content congruent dimensions suggests that the CBCL could be a useful screening instrument to help identify mania and its associated comorbid conditions in referred children. Because other research groups replicated his findings, they now provide a simple method for pediatricians and child psychiatrists to screen for bipolar disorder in their practices.

Prior work suggested that there may be a familial link between ADHD and bipolar disorder. However, these prior studies had not explored the nature of this familial link. Thus, Biederman sought to clarify the familial relationship between ADHD and bipolar disorder by testing competing hypotheses, based in part on models of familial transmission. He did this in two separate samples: the clinically referred bipolar disorder children described above and a sample 140 ADHD probands and 120 normal controls. These studies found elevated rates of bipolar disorder in the families of ADHD children. However, bipolar disorder was found almost exclusively among the families of ADHD+bipolar disorder children. In these families, ADHD and bipolar disorder cosegregated. He subsequently replicated these findings among families of ADHD girls. Overall, the pattern of results suggested that the comorbid condition of ADHD+bipolar disorder was a severe and distinct familial subtype of illness.

Diagnostic criterion overlap between ADHD and bipolar disorder raised the possibility that their apparent comorbidity is due to symptom overlap. To examine this issue, Biederman performed symptom overlap analyses separately on two samples: bipolar disorder children with ADHD and bipolar disorder adults with ADHD. These studies showed that, for the majority of ADHD children and adults, the ADHD diagnosis cannot be accounted for by symptoms of bipolar disorder. Moreover, the bipolar disorder observed in these samples could not be attributed to symptom overlap with ADHD.

Biederman also evaluated the psychiatric, cognitive and functional correlates of ADHD children with and without comorbid bipolar disorder (bipolar disorder). He diagnosed bipolar disorder in 11% of ADHD children at baseline and in an additional 12% at four year follow-up. These rates were significantly higher than those of controls at each assessment. ADHD children with comorbid bipolar disorder at either baseline or follow-up assessment had significantly higher rates of additional psychopathology, psychiatric hospitalization, and severely impaired psychosocial functioning than other ADHD children. The clinical picture of bipolarity was mostly irritable and mixed. ADHD children with comorbid bipolar disorder also had a very severe symptomatic picture of ADHD as well as prototypical correlates of the disorder. Comorbidity between ADHD and bipolar disorder was not due to symptom overlap. ADHD children who developed bipolar disorder at the 4 year follow-up had higher initial rates of comorbidity, more symptoms of ADHD, worse scores on the CBCL and a greater family history of depression compared with non-bipolar disorder, ADHD children. These results extended previous results documenting that children with ADHD are at increased risk to develop bipolar disorder with its associated severe morbidity, dysfunction and incapacitation.

The connection between ADHD and bipolar disorder along with the well known link between ADHD and conduct disorder (CD), led Biederman to further examine the link between bipolar disorder and CD. He reasoned that the aggression and conduct disordered behavior of bipolar disorder children might respond to mood stabilization. Thus, he sought to identify a more homogeneous subgroup of CD youth with distinct pathophysiology, course, family history, outcome and treatment response. To address this issue, Biederman examined 140 ADHD and 120 normal controls at baseline and four years later using assessments from multiple domains. He compared ADHD subgroups with and without conduct (CD) and bipolar (bipolar disorder) disorders on psychiatric outcomes at a four-year follow-up, familial psychopathology and psychosocial functioning. He found that ADHD children with both disorders had higher familial and personal risk for mood disorders than those with CD only who had a higher personal risk for antisocial personality disorder. Among ADHD probands, having both CD and bipolar disorder was associated with poorer functioning and an increased risk for psychiatric hospitalization. These findings along with additional work from his group validated a syndrome expressed as bipolar disorder, CD and ADHD that may be a distinct nosological entity and certainly is one of the most impairing and costly of child psychiatric disorders.

Another of Biederman's studies sought to compare the characteristics and correlates of mania among referred adolescents and to determine whether ADHD is a marker of very early onset mania. From 668 consecutive admissions he recruited 68 children and 42 adolescent with mania. These were compared with the 558 non-manic referrals and 100 normal controls. With the exception of comorbidity with ADHD, there were more similarities than differences between the children and adolescents with mania in course and correlates. There was an inverse relationship between the rates of comorbid ADHD and age of onset of mania: higher in manic children, intermediate in adolescents with childhood onset mania and lower in adolescent with adolescent onset mania. He concluded that ADHD is more common among childhood onset compared with adolescent onset cases of bipolar disorder, suggesting that, in some cases, ADHD may signal a very early onset of bipolar disorder. Clinical similarities between the child and adolescent onset cases provided evidence for the clinical validity of childhood onset mania.

Biederman's diagnostic and family studies laid the ground work for preventive treatment studies. He first studied a sample of 59 consecutively referred pediatric patients who, at initial intake, satisfied diagnostic criteria for mania on a structured diagnostic interview. He systematically reviewed their clinical records to assess: 1) the course of manic symptoms and 2) all medications prescribed at each follow-up visit. Survival analysis was used to determine the effect of mood stabilizers and other medications on the course of manic symptoms. The occurrence of manic symptoms significantly predicted the subsequent prescription of mood stabilizers and mood stabilizers predicted decreases in manic symptoms. However, improvement was slow and associated with a substantial risk for relapse. He concluded that mood stabilizers were frequently used in manic children and their use was associated with significant improvement of manic symptoms while antidepressant, and stimulant medications were not.

The diagnostic studies suggested an additional target for secondary prevention in bipolar disorder: comorbid ADHD and depressive symptoms. In evaluation of the clinical records of pediatrically referred patients with a diagnosis of bipolar disorder and comorbid ADHD, Biederman found that the presence of mania interfered with the improvement of ADHD symptomatology during anti-ADHD pharmacotherapy such that ADHD symptoms were much more likely to improve after mood stabilization. Although treatment with tricyclic antidepressants (TCAs) had significant anti-ADHD effects, they also had a destabilizing impact on manic symptoms. Biederman also reported that SSRIs were selectively efficacious in the treatment of bipolar depression. However, SSRIs were also associated with destabilizing effects on manic symptomatology in those patients presenting with depressive symptoms in the absence of active mania but that concomitant use of SSRIs did not inhibit the anti-manic effects of mood stabilizers. Since bipolar youth commonly present to clinical practice with depression, these results underscored the importance of assessing a lifetime history of bipolar disorder in making treatment decisions in depressed youth.

The significance of Biederman's work in juvenile bipolar disorder went beyond resolving a vexing nosological question. bipolar disorder children may be relatively uncommon in most outpatient settings, but clinical experience suggests that they account for a substantial number of child psychiatric hospitalizations and that they are plagued with chronic psychiatric and psychosocial disability. Biederman's identification of a nosologically distinct subgroup provided a first step toward validating this subgroup that has led to improved guidelines for diagnosis, treatment and prevention. By clarifying the link between bipolar disorder and CD, Biederman also helped clinicians understand the importance of assessing symptoms of bipolar disorder in children with conduct disorder, a group that has proven refractory to most other pharmacologic treatments. By reducing the aggressiveness and delinquency of bipolar disorder+CD children, the treatment protocols developed by Biederman make possible the primary prevention of some violent behavior in juveniles. Because these youth are also at very high risk for substance abuse and dependence, the primary prevention of these disorders in bipolar disorder youth is now possible.

== Research funding ==
During his lifetime, he was awarded over 15 million dollars in grant funding from the National Institutes of Health to support his research into the nature, causes and treatment of mental health disorders in youth. Johnson & Johnson gave more than $700,000 to a research center headed by Biederman, which was involved in research on Risperdal, the company's antipsychotic drug.

== Questions of ethics ==
In 2008, Senator Chuck Grassley, undertook an investigation that alleged that Joseph Biederman had violated federal regulations in addition to Harvard Medical School's and Massachusetts General Hospital's research rules by receiving money from the pharmaceutical companies. According to newspaper reports, Biederman received research funding from 15 drug companies and served as a paid speaker or adviser to seven, including Eli Lilly & Co. and Janssen Pharmaceuticals. Biederman earned consulting fees of at least $1.6 million over eight years from pharmaceutical companies.

Subsequent to these reports, the Massachusetts General Hospital launched an investigation. Biederman said that he was not influenced by the money and that some of his work supported drugs other than Risperdal. In 2011, Massachusetts General Hospital and Harvard Medical School disciplined Biederman for small clerical errors that violated conflict of interest policies. Drs. Joseph Biederman, Thomas Spencer and Timothy Wilens were barred from accepting payments for "all paid industry-sponsor outside activities" for one year, required to seek approval for "paid activities" and required to disclose those activities for two years, undergo training on conflicts of interest, and face a delay in of consideration for promotion and advancement. Biederman retained his Professorship at Harvard and his positions at the Massachusetts General Hospital where he was subsequently awarded an endowed Chair.

According to ProPublica's drug company money database, Biederman received over $3,000 from pharmaceutical company Shire's North American division in 2018, mainly for consulting. According to Gardiner Harris, in his exposé of Johnson & Johnson "No More Tears," Beiderman was paid millions of undisclosed dollars by the pharmceutical company to support his research and enrich himself.
