= Behavioral Ecology (journal) =

- Discipline: Evolutionary biology
- Language: English
- Edited by: Leigh Simmons

Publication details
- History: 1990–present
- Publisher: Oxford University Press on behalf of the International Society for Behavioral Ecology
- Frequency: Bimonthly
- Impact factor: 2.671 (2020)

Standard abbreviations
- ISO 4: Behav. Ecol.

Indexing
- ISSN: 1045-2249 (print); 1465-7279 (web)
- LCCN: 90650061
- OCLC no.: 41963900

Links
- Journal homepage; Online access; Online archive

Behavioral Ecology is a bimonthly peer-reviewed scientific journal published by Oxford University Press on behalf of the International Society for Behavioral Ecology. The journal was established in 1990.

== Scope ==
Behavioral Ecology publishes empirical and theoretical papers on a broad range of topics related to behavioural ecology, including ethology, sociobiology, evolution, and ecology of behaviour. The journal includes research at the levels of the individual, population, and community on various organisms such as vertebrates, invertebrates, and plants.

According to the Journal Citation Reports, the journal has a 2020 impact factor of 2.671, ranking it 22nd out of 175 journals in the category "Zoology".

== Article categories ==
The journal publishes following types of articles:

- original articles
- reviews
- commentaries
