= Accident insurance =

Insurance that pays benefits for injuries or death caused by accidental events

Accident insurance is a type of insurance where the policy holder is paid directly in the event of an accident resulting in injury of the insured. The insured can spend the benefit payment however they choose. Accident insurance is complementary to, not a replacement for, health insurance.

== Accidents ==
While accidents and their causes vary wildly, the general definition of an accident is an unfortunate incident that happens unexpectedly and unintentionally, typically resulting in damage or injury. Accident insurers may define accidents differently in their specific policies.

== Common exclusions ==
Every insurer maintains a list of events and circumstances that void the insured's entitlement to his or her accident benefits. For example, accident insurance policies may exclude coverage for injuries sustained while the insured was intoxicated or committing an illegal act.

== Comparison to other types of insurance ==
Accident insurance is part of a category of insurance products designed to manage the cost of medical care. Other types of insurance in this category include health insurance, disability insurance, and accidental death & dismemberment insurance. Accident insurance is part of a category distinct from liability insurance or property insurance.

=== Health insurance ===
Accident insurance complements but does not replace health insurance. In the event of an accident resulting in an injury, a health insurance policyholder may still be responsible for out-of-pocket expenses. These may include copayments, deductibles, and coinsurance charges that must be paid by the insured before the health insurer pays any benefits. In the first half of 2018, almost half of Americans with health insurance had high-deductible plans—defined as plans with a deductible of at least $1,350 for an individual policyholder. Without accident insurance, the insured would be responsible for paying that full amount (plus a copayment and any out-of-network costs) themselves before a health insurer began paying for care.

=== Disability insurance ===
Like accident insurance, disability insurance pays the insured directly if they are injured in a way covered by the policy. However, disability insurance only pays if the injury prevents the insured from working. Accident insurance benefits are paid whether or not the insured misses work as a result of the accident.

=== Accidental death & dismemberment insurance ===
In the event of an accidental death, accidental death and dismemberment insurance, often abbreviated as "AD&D", will pay benefits in addition to any life insurance held by the insured. Accidental deaths are the third leading cause of death in the U.S. Some accident insurance policies will include benefits for accidental death and dismemberment.

== Policy structures ==
=== Individual policies ===
Individual plans are designed to cover a single person or family that is not purchasing accident insurance through an organization.

=== Group policies ===
Group accident insurance plans are those that are created to be sold through an employer or other incorporated organization. They are typically designed and priced for the group as a whole.

=== On-demand accident insurance ===
With on-demand accident insurance, the policyholder receives coverage the same day they apply for it. In addition, on-demand insurance providers may offer episodic insurance policies, which allow the policyholder to customize the term of the policy (i.e. the duration of coverage). The policyholder need only pay for coverage for as long as they need or can afford it. Prices generally correspond to the length of the term, with lower prices for shorter terms.

== See also ==
- Accident-proneness
