= Acrophobia =

Extreme fear of heights

- Other names: Hypsophobia; Fear of heights
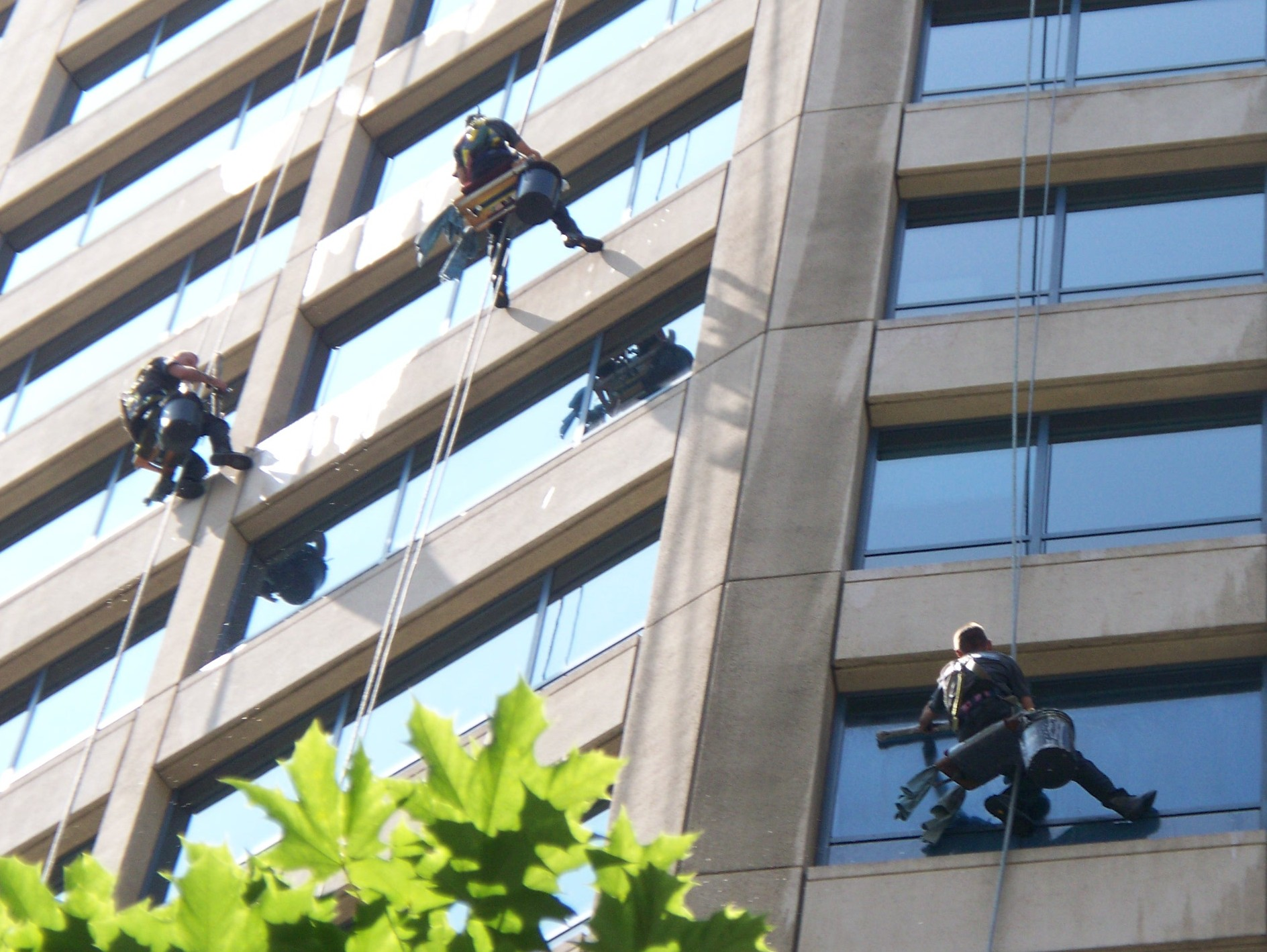
- Some jobs require working at heights, which can be a problem for acrophobes
- Pronunciation: /ˌækrəˈfoʊbiə/
- Specialty: Psychiatry
- Symptoms: Extreme or irrational fear of heights
- Complications: Panic attacks on high places
- Frequency: 6.4% (lifetime risk); 2.0% (12-month risk)

Acrophobia, also known as hypsophobia, is an extreme or irrational fear or phobia of heights, especially when one is not particularly high up. It belongs to a category of specific phobias, called space and motion discomfort, that share similar causes and options for treatment.

Most people experience a degree of natural fear when exposed to heights, known as the fear of falling. On the other hand, those who have little fear of such exposure are said to have a head for heights. A head for heights is advantageous for hiking or climbing in mountainous terrain and also in certain jobs such as steeplejacks or wind turbine mechanics.

People with acrophobia can experience a panic attack in high places and become too agitated to get themselves down safely. Approximately 2–5% of the general population has acrophobia, with twice as many women affected as men. The term is from the Greek: ἄκρον, ákron, meaning "peak, summit, edge" and φόβος, phóbos, "fear". The term "hypsophobia" derives from the Greek word ύψος (hypsos), meaning "height". In Modern Greek, the actual term used for this condition is "υψοφοβία" (hypsophobia).

== Confusion with vertigo ==
"Vertigo" is often used to describe a fear of heights, but it is more accurately a spinning sensation that occurs when one is not actually spinning. It can be triggered by looking down from a high place, by looking straight up at a high place or tall object, or even by watching something (i.e. a car or a bird) go past at high speed, but this alone does not describe vertigo. True vertigo can be triggered by almost any type of movement (e.g. standing up, sitting down, walking) or change in visual perspective (e.g. squatting down, walking up or down stairs, looking out of the window of a moving car or train). Vertigo is called height vertigo when the sensation of vertigo is triggered by heights.

Height vertigo is caused by a conflict between vision, vestibular and somatosensory senses. This occurs when vestibular and somatosensory systems sense a body movement that is not detected by the eyes. More research indicates that this conflict leads to both motion sickness and anxiety. Confusion may arise in differentiating between height vertigo and acrophobia due to the conditions' overlapping symptom pools, including body swaying and dizziness. Further confusion can occur due to height vertigo being a direct symptom of acrophobia.

== Causes ==
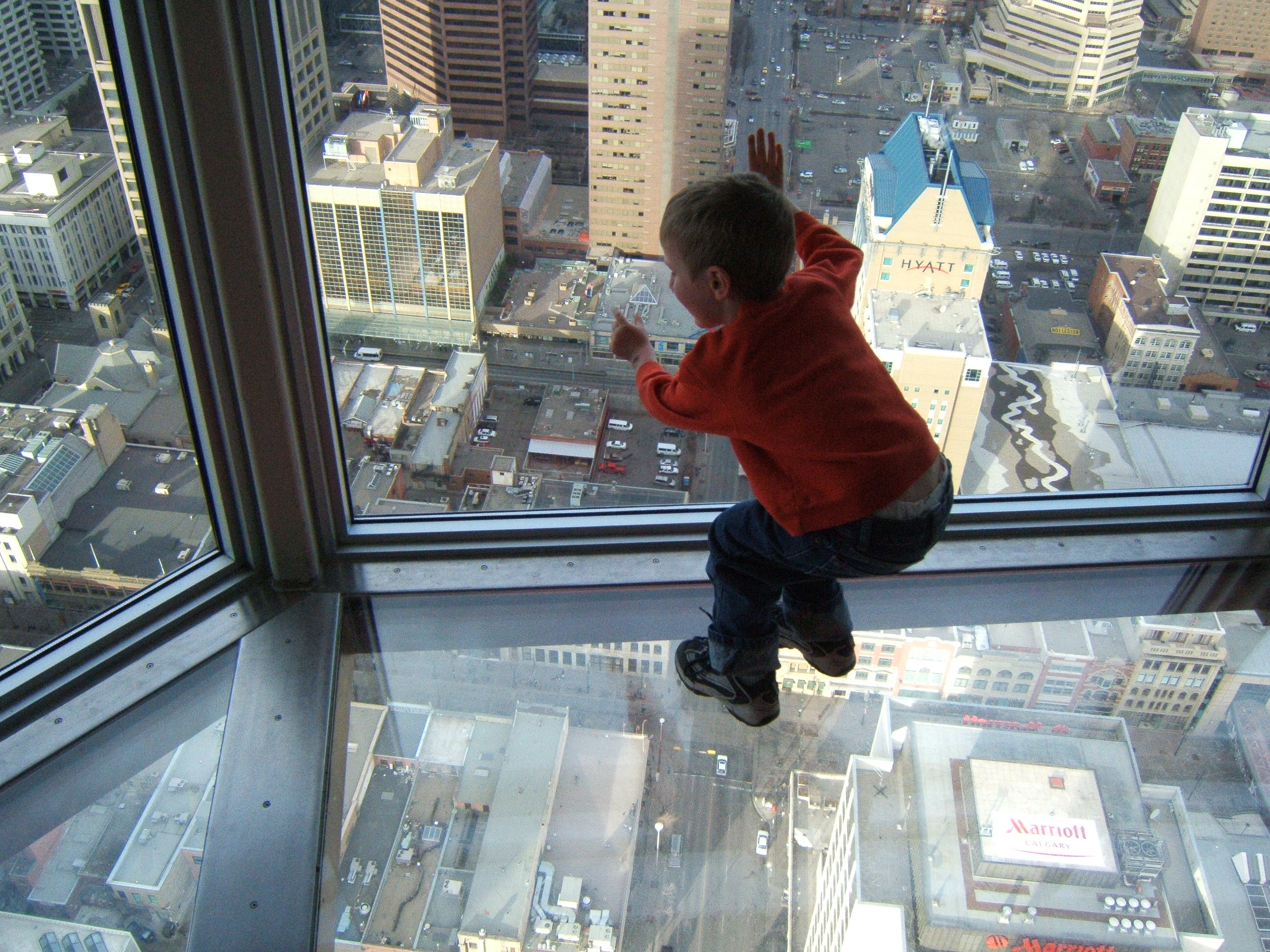
530 feet (160 m) above the streets of Calgary

Traditionally, acrophobia has been attributed, like other phobias, to conditioning or a traumatic experience. Recent studies have cast doubt on this explanation. Individuals with acrophobia are found to be lacking in traumatic experiences. Nevertheless, this may be due to the failure to recall the experiences, as memory fades as time passes. To address the problems of self report and memory, a large cohort study with 1000 participants was conducted from birth; the results showed that participants with less fear of heights had more injuries because of falling. Psychologists Richie Poulton, Simon Davies, Ross G. Menzies, John D. Langley, and Phil A. Silva sampled subjects from the Dunedin Multidisciplinary Health and Development Study who had been injured in a fall between the ages of 5 and 9, compared them to children who had no similar injury, and found that at age 18, acrophobia was present in only 2 percent of the subjects who had an injurious fall but was present among 7 percent of subjects who had no injurious fall (with the same sample finding that typical basophobia was 7 times less common in subjects at age 18 who had injurious falls as children than subjects that did not).

More studies have suggested a possible explanation for acrophobia is that it emerges through accumulation of non-traumatic experiences of falling that are not memorable but can influence behaviours in the future. Also, fear of heights may be acquired when infants learn to crawl. If they fell, they would learn the concepts about surfaces, posture, balance, and movement. Cognitive factors may also contribute to the development of acrophobia. People tend to wrongly interpret visuo-vestibular discrepancies as dizziness and nausea and associate them with a forthcoming fall. Experiencing these cognitive factors while associating them with the idea of falling may be enough to cause the same fear that would be expected after a traumatic fall.

A fear of falling, along with a fear of loud noises, is one of the most commonly suggested inborn or "non-associative" fears. The newer non-association theory is that a fear of heights is an evolved adaptation to a world where falls posed a significant danger. If this fear is inherited, it is possible that people can get rid of it by frequent exposure of heights in habituation. In other words, acrophobia could be associated with a lack of exposure to heights in early life. The degree of fear varies, and the term phobia is reserved for those at the extreme end of the spectrum. Researchers have argued that a fear of heights is an instinct found in many mammals, including domestic animals and humans. Experiments using visual cliffs have shown human infants and toddlers, as well as other animals of various ages, to be reluctant in venturing onto a glass floor with a view of a few meters of apparent fall-space below it. Although human infants initially experienced fear when crawling on the visual cliff, most of them overcame the fear through practice, exposure and mastery and retained a level of healthy cautiousness. While an innate cautiousness around heights is helpful for survival, extreme fear can interfere with the activities of everyday life, such as standing on a ladder or chair, or even walking up a flight of stairs. It is uncertain if acrophobia is related to the failure to reach a certain developmental stage. Besides associative accounts, a diathetic-stress model is also very appealing for considering both vicarious learning and hereditary factors such as personality traits (i.e., neuroticism).

Another possible contributing factor is a dysfunction in maintaining balance. In this case, the anxiety is both well-founded and secondary. The human balance system integrates proprioceptive, vestibular and nearby visual cues to reckon position and motion. As height increases, visual cues recede and balance becomes poorer in people without acrophobia. However, most people respond to such a situation by shifting to more reliance on the proprioceptive and vestibular branches of the equilibrium system.

Some people are more dependent on visual signals than others. People who rely more on visual cues to control body movements are less physically stable. An acrophobic, however, continues to over-rely on visual signals, whether because of inadequate vestibular function or incorrect strategy. Locomotion at a high elevation requires more than normal visual processing. The visual cortex becomes overloaded, resulting in confusion. Some proponents of the alternative view of acrophobia warn that it may be ill-advised to encourage acrophobics to expose themselves to height without first resolving the vestibular issues. Research is underway at several clinics. Recent studies found that participants experienced increased anxiety not only when the height increased, but also when they were required to move sideways at a fixed height.

A recombinant model of the development of acrophobia is very possible, in which learning factors, cognitive factors (e.g. interpretations), perceptual factors (e.g. visual dependence), and biological factors (e.g. heredity) interact to provoke fear or habituation.

== Assessment ==
ICD-10 and DSM-5 are used to diagnose acrophobia. Acrophobia Questionnaire (AQ) is a self report that contains 40 items, assessing anxiety level on a 0–6 point scale and degree of avoidance on a 0–2 point scale. The Attitude Towards Heights Questionnaires (ATHQ) and Behavioural Avoidance Tests (BAT) are also used.

However, acrophobic individuals tend to have biases in self-reporting. They often overestimate the danger and question their abilities of addressing height relevant issues. A Height Interpretation Questionnaire (HIQ) is a self-report to measure these height relevant judgements and interpretations. The Depression Scale of the Depression Anxiety Stress Scales short form (DASS21-DS) is a self report used to examine validity of the HIQ.

== Treatment ==
Traditional treatment of phobias is still in use today. Its underlying theory states that phobic anxiety is conditioned and triggered by a conditional stimulus. By avoiding phobic situations, anxiety is reduced. However, avoidance behaviour is reinforced through negative reinforcement. Wolpe developed a technique called systematic desensitization to help participants avoid "avoidance". Research results have suggested that even with a decrease in therapeutic contact, desensitization is still very effective. However, other studies have shown that therapists play an essential role in acrophobia treatment. Treatments like reinforced practice and self-efficacy treatments also emerged.

There have been a number of studies into using virtual reality therapy for acrophobia. Botella and colleagues and Schneider were the first to use VR in treatment. Specifically, Schneider utilised inverted lenses in binoculars to "alter" the reality. Later in the mid-1990s, VR became computer-based and was widely available for therapists. A cheap VR equipment uses a normal PC with head-mounted display (HMD). In contrast, VRET uses an advanced computer automatic virtual environment (CAVE). VR has several advantages over in vivo treatment: (1) therapist can control the situation better by manipulating the stimuli, in terms of their quality, intensity, duration and frequency; (2) VR can help participants avoid public embarrassment and protect their confidentiality; (3) therapist's office can be well-maintained; (4) VR encourages more people to seek treatment; (5) VR saves time and money, as participants do not need to leave the consulting room.

Many different types of medications are used in the treatment of phobias like fear of heights, including traditional anti-anxiety drugs such as benzodiazepines, and newer options such as antidepressants and beta-blockers.

== Prognosis ==
Some desensitization treatments produce short-term improvements in symptoms. Long-term treatment success has been elusive.

== Epidemiology ==
Approximately 2–5% of the general population has acrophobia, with twice as many women affected as men.

A related, milder form of visually triggered fear or anxiety is called visual height intolerance (vHI). Up to one-third of people may have some level of visual height intolerance. Pure vHI usually has smaller impact on individuals compared to acrophobia, in terms of intensity of symptoms load, social life, and overall life quality. However, few people with visual height intolerance seek professional help.

== See also ==
- Acclimatization
- List of phobias

== General and cited sources ==
- Sartorius, N.; Henderson, A.S.; Strotzka, H.; Lipowski, Z.; Yu-cun, S.; You-xin, X.; Strömgren, E.; Glatzel, J.; et al. "The ICD-10 Classification of Mental and Behavioural Disorders Clinical descriptions and diagnostic guidelines" (PDF). World Health Organization. p. 114.
