= Journal of Attention Disorders =

- Discipline: Psychiatry
- Language: English
- Edited by: Michael Kofler

Publication details
- History: 1996-present
- Publisher: SAGE Publications
- Frequency: 14/year
- Impact factor: 3.668 (2017)

Standard abbreviations
- ISO 4: J. Atten. Disord.

Indexing
- ISSN: 1087-0547 (print); 1557-1246 (web)
- LCCN: 96660069
- OCLC no.: 796012956

Links
- Journal homepage; Online access; Online archive

The Journal of Attention Disorders is a peer-reviewed academic journal covering the field of psychiatry and attention disorders. This journal is a member of the Committee on Publication Ethics (COPE). The journal's editor is Michael Kofler (Florida State University). It was founded by Keith Conners (Duke University) and Sam Goldstein (University of Utah), has been in publication since 1996, and is currently published by SAGE Publications.

== Abstracting and indexing ==
The Journal of Attention Disorders is abstracted and indexed in, among other databases: SCOPUS, and the Social Sciences Citation Index. According to the Journal Citation Reports, its 2017 impact factor is 3.668, ranking it 39 out of 142 journals in the category 'Psychiatry'. and 12 out of 73 journals in the category 'Psychology, Developmental'.
