= Family study =

Genetic epidemiological study of families

In genetic epidemiology, family studies are studies of whether a disease or trait "runs in a family". In other words, they are studies aimed at detecting the presence or absence of familial aggregation for the disease or trait, in which having a family history is associated with greater risk. The family research design can also be used to estimate penetrance for a given genotype, to conduct genetic association studies, and to study potential modifiers of an individual's genetic risk. If a family study shows that a trait is familial, this is a necessary, but not sufficient, criterion for it to be established as genetically influenced.

== Types ==
There are three main types of family studies in genetics:

1. Those aimed at measuring the extent of familial aggregation for a trait
  1. Familial aggregation is the practice of combing multiple data sets of different traits and/or characteristics in a family.
  2. Family history of disease is collected in case studies, which seeks if a certain disease of one family member increases the risk of that disease being passed down to others. This could be related to either genes or environmental factors.
2. Linkage studies aimed at identifying specific genetic loci that have a moderate to large effect on risk
  1. Genetic linkage occurs when two genes on a DNA sequence on the same chromosome are inherited together.
  2. This can occur with sex linked genes with the X or Y chromosome. Although it is more common to be inherited from the X chromosome because the Y chromosome has less genes attached.
3. Association studies aimed at detecting loci with relatively small effects on risk.
  1. Locus (loci plural) is the physical location and position of a gene or genetic marker on the chromosome.
  2. Chromosomes carry genetic information across all of it, each gene having its specific location and position. There are 40,000 to 100,000 protein coding genes across human chromosomes.
