= Carelessness =

Lack of awareness during a behaviour that can result in unintentional consequences

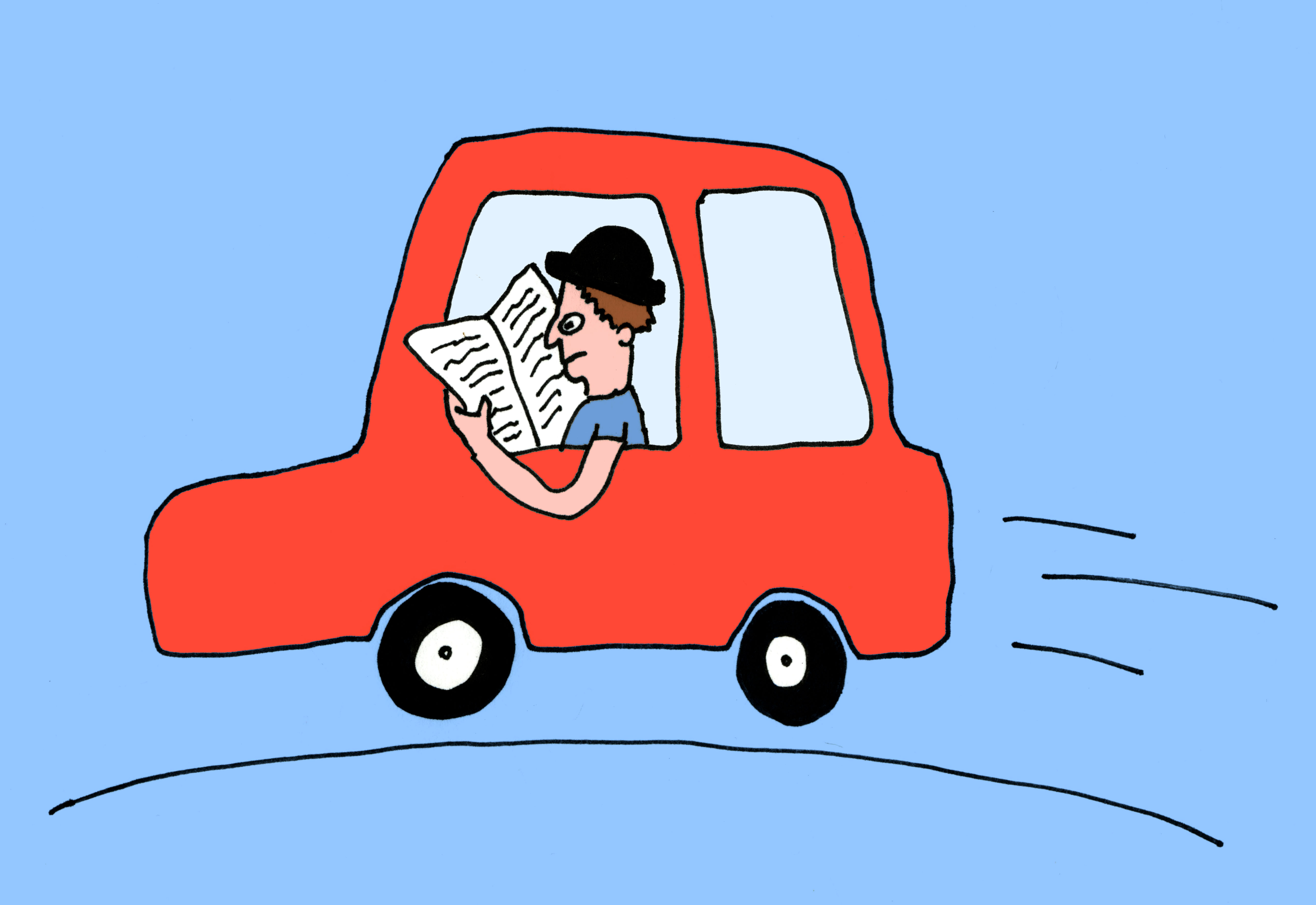

Carelessness refers to the lack of awareness during a behaviour that can result in unintended consequences. The consequences of carelessness are often undesirable and tend to be mistakes. A lack of concern or an indifference for the consequences of the action due to inattention may be involved in the origin of carelessness.

Carelessness has been hypothesized to be one possible cause of accident-proneness.

== Associated areas of concern ==
=== Education ===
In any education environment, careless mistakes are errors that occur in areas within which the student has had training. Careless mistakes are common occurrences for students both within and outside of the learning environment. They are often associated with a lapse in judgment because the students had the know-how to avoid making such mistakes, but did not for undeterminable reasons. Given that students that are competent of the subject and focused are most likely to make careless mistakes, concerns for students exhibiting careless mistakes often turn toward neurological disorders as the cause.

Attention deficit hyperactivity disorder (ADHD) is a neurodevelopmental and neuropsychiatric disorder that is known to impact students' performance in school due to the culmination of its symptoms creating abnormalities in their levels of attention, hyperactivity, and impulsivity. It is not entirely invalid for there to be concern of ADHD in students who make careless mistakes without any other logical explanation. In addition, making careless mistakes is a symptom of ADHD that is commonly studied. Although largely studied for its prevalence in children and adolescents, there is still limited knowledge about the origin of the disorder.

=== Research and data collection ===
Data is information or evidence that is gathered from an environment or sample to be processed and interpreted to find and provide results for a particular study. Research data has an important role in the field of psychology, providing insight to be analyzed, shared, and stored for future reference.

Particularly, survey data collection refers to the gathering of information from subjects in a sample by empirical research methods in order to attain a comprehensive examination of a situation or specific study from the individuals. The validity of the responses of the subjects in the sample is important, as they provide the basis for which a conclusion can be drawn in that study.

In survey data, careless responses are those that are defined to have not been entirely authentic or to be lacking in relevance to the topic being examined in the study. Also referred to as random response, this is an area of concern in research studies and data collection due to the possible impacts that error data could have on the significance conclusion to be drawn later. Attention and interest are both factors that have a possible influence on the validity of an individual's responses. Careless data can lead to lower reliability, which will ultimately decrease the intensity of correlation, if one exists. A method known as data screening is recommended as a means of discerning between response data that is valid and that which is careless.

== See also ==
- Impulsivity
- Negligence
