= Neutral stimulus =

Stimulus initially producing no specific response

A neutral stimulus is a stimulus which initially produces no specific response other than focusing attention. In classical conditioning, when used together with an unconditioned stimulus, the neutral stimulus becomes a conditioned stimulus. With repeated presentations of both the neutral stimulus and the unconditioned stimulus, the neutral stimulus will elicit a response as well, known as a conditioned response. Once the neutral stimulus elicits a conditioned response, the neutral stimulus becomes known as a conditioned stimulus. The conditioned response is the same as the unconditioned response, but occurs in the presence of the conditioned stimulus rather than the unconditioned stimulus.

== Pavlov's research in digestion ==
Ivan Pavlov conducted multiple experiments investigating digestion in dogs in which neutral, unconditioned, and conditioned stimuli were used. In these experiments, the neutral stimulus was the sound of a bell ringing. This sound was presented to the dogs along with food, which acted as an unconditioned stimulus. The presentation of a neutral stimulus does not result in any particular response, but the presentation of an unconditioned stimulus results in an unconditioned response, which was the dogs salivating in Pavlov's experiments. After conditioning, the bell ringing became a conditioned stimulus. Pavlov later used the sound of a metronome as a neutral stimulus in studies on cerebral cortex activity.

== See also ==
- Behavior modification
