= Conditioned emotional response =

Specific learned behavior from classical conditioning

The term conditioned emotional response (CER) can refer to a specific learned behavior or a procedure commonly used in classical or Pavlovian conditioning research. It may also be called "conditioned suppression" or "conditioned fear response (CFR)." It is an "emotional response" that results from classical conditioning, usually from the association of a relatively neutral stimulus with a painful or fear-inducing unconditional stimulus. As a result, the formerly neutral stimulus elicits fear. For example, if seeing a dog (a neutral stimulus) is paired with the pain of being bitten by the dog (unconditioned stimulus), seeing a dog may become a conditioned stimulus that elicits fear (conditioned response).

== Experimentation ==
In 1920 John B. Watson and Rosalie Rayner demonstrated such fear conditioning in the Little Albert experiment. They started with a 9-month boy called "Albert", who was unemotional but was made to cry by the loud noise (unconditioned stimulus) of a hammer striking a steel bar. Albert initially showed no fear of a white rat (neutral stimulus), but after the sight of the rat had been accompanied five times by the loud noise, he cried and tried to escape the rat, showing that the rat had become a conditioned stimulus for fear. Although the Watson and Rayner work with Little Albert clearly falls under the broad umbrella of "conditioned fear" they did not use the term CER and thought they were applying more general conditioning principles to human behavior.

In 1941 B.F. Skinner and William Kaye Estes were the first to use the term "CER" and demonstrated the phenomenon with rats. They trained food-deprived rats to lever-press (operant conditioning) for food pellets, maintained on a variable interval (VI) schedule of reinforcement. Periodically, a tone was presented, for a brief amount of time, which co-terminated with electric shock to the metal floor (classical delay conditioning). The rats, upon receipt of the first shock, displayed the expected unconditional responses to the shock (e.g., jumping, squealing, urinating, etc.), however with subsequent presentations of the tone-shock trials, those responses habituated somewhat. The largest change in behavior occurred during the time the tone was presented. That is, lever-pressing during the tone reduced to near zero levels. Given that the tone-shock pairings were likely sufficient to produce classical conditioning, Estes and Skinner hypothesized that the tone elicited fear that interfered or interrupted ongoing operant behavior. In a sense, the now CS (tone) "paralyzed in fear" the rat. Note that the suppression of lever-pressing was robust, even though the operant, lever-press - food contingency was not altered at all. This experiment is critical in experimental psychology for it demonstrated that the interaction of classical and operant conditioning contingency could be powerful in altering behavior. This work sparked a number of experiments on this interaction, resulting in important experimental and theoretical contributions on autoshaping, negative automaintenance, and potentiated feeding, to name a few.

More importantly, the CER procedure solved a serious experimental problem in classical conditioning. In Pavlov's original demonstration of classical conditioning, he used a backward conditioning arrangement as the control condition. Briefly, in that procedure, the dogs experienced the same number of US presentations (food) and the same number of CS presentations (metronome ticking) as the experimental groups, but the timing of the CS and US presentations were reversed. The US preceded the CS, rather than the other way around. In the backward conditioning control procedure popular with Pavlov, his dogs did not salivate to the presentation of the CS, in contrast to those that received forward conditioning. However, the dogs did learn something - the presentation of the metronome predicted the absence of the food. This phenomenon we now call "conditioned inhibition." However, since Pavlov was studying conditioned excitation, by measuring drops of saliva, he could not experimentally measure the inhibition of salivation. There was a floor effect as the dogs could not salivate below 0 drops of saliva. Thus, the lack of salivation by Pavlov's dogs led him to conclude that no conditioning resulted, however, he could not measure conditioning. The CER procedure obviates this problem because conditioning is typically measured with a "suppression ratio", the ratio of responding during the CS period relative to a period of equal length but without the CS (usually immediately prior to the presentation of the CS). A measure of 0.5 indicates no conditioning, while measures that deviate from 0.5 reflect effective conditioning, relatively (0 is indicative of asymptotic conditioning). CER can, therefore, measure both conditioned excitation and conditioned inhibition.

== Neurological Origin ==
The amygdala, located in the temporal lobe, is a key brain region involved in the conditioned fear response and contributes to the autonomic, hormonal, and behavioral factors associated with that response. According to studies by Coover, Murison, & Jellestad and Davis and LeDoux in 1992, when a dog's amygdala is damaged, it does not show fear, and, when tamed by human beings, the dog's stress hormone levels in the blood are lower than they are in a normal dog. Similarly, humans become less likely to report feelings of fear after their amygdala has been damaged due to injury or stroke.

The most common measure of the CFR is the suppression ratio.

== See also ==
- Classical conditioning
