= Isaac Marks =

British psychiatrist

Isaac Meyer Marks (born 1935 in Cape Town, South Africa) is a British-South African psychiatrist. He trained in medicine in South Africa, qualifying in 1956. His training as a psychiatrist began in 1960 at the University of London (at the Bethlem-Maudsley Hospital) and was completed in 1963. In 1971, he was a founder Member of the Royal College of Psychiatrists, and in 1976 he was elected a Fellow.

Between 1964 and 2000, he conducted clinical research at the Institute of Psychiatry, University of London, and the Bethlem-Maudsley Hospital. He collaborated with the Chief Nursing Officer there, Eileen Skellern, to develop an innovative course for nurses in behavioural psychotherapy, which started in 1973. He became Honorary Consultant Psychiatrist at the Institute in 1968, and Professor of Experimental Psychopathology in 1978. In 2000, he became Professor Emeritus.

From 2000-2003, he ran a computer-aided self-help clinic at Imperial College, London, where he was a visiting professor. He is now also honorary professor at the Free University of Amsterdam.

Marks' research included the treatment of anxiety, phobic, obsessive-compulsive and sexual disorders; interactions between drugs and behavioral psychotherapy; development of a nurse behavioral psychotherapist training program (in relation to which he coined the term 'barefoot therapist', modelled on Mao Zedong's term Barefoot Doctor); community care of serious mental illness; health care and cost-effectiveness evaluation; and electroshock conversion therapy. He has developed computer aids both to evaluate treatment outcome and for self-help - matters which continue to be a central interest.

He was also instrumental in the creation of the self-help organisation Triumph Over Phobia and was a founding member of the BABCP. He is married to Shula Marks.

== Writings ==
- Living with Fear: Understanding and Coping with Anxiety (1978) ISBN 0-07-040396-1
- Cure and Care of Neuroses (1988) ISBN 0-88048-162-5
- The Practice of Behavioural and Cognitive Psychotherapy (foreword) (1991) ISBN 0-521-41741-4
- Hands-on Help: Computer-aided Psychotherapy (2007) ISBN 978-1-84169-679-9
- Fears, Phobias, and Rituals: Panic, Anxiety, and Their Disorders (1987) ISBN 0-19-503927-0
