= Chelmsford Royal Commission =

Australian royal commission

- Date: 1988–1990
- Duration: 2 years
- Location: Sydney, Australia
- Also known as: Royal Commission into Mental Health Services
- Commissioner: Justice John Patrick Slattery

The Royal Commission into Mental Health Services, more commonly known as the Chelmsford Royal Commission (1988–1990), was a royal commission in the Australian state of New South Wales, chaired by Justice John Patrick Slattery. Established by the Government of New South Wales to investigate mental health services in the state, the royal commission came about only after prominent Sydney radio and television shows pressured the newly elected Health Minister, Peter Collins, to make good his promises for a Royal Commission.

Originally, its prime focus was to have been psychosurgery at the NSW Neuropsychiatric Institute. Following media pressure it focused more on the deep sleep therapy of Dr. Harry Bailey, who from 1963 to 1979 was the director of the state-funded Neuropsychiatric Institute and then Chelmsford Private Hospital, a private psychiatric institution in the Pennant Hills suburb of Sydney.

"Deep Sleep Therapy" was a practice of putting psychiatric patients into an induced coma for up to two weeks. The treatment resulted in about 25 deaths, with hundreds more suffering side effects.

== Background ==
Bailey committed suicide in September 1985 in response to the ongoing media exposure of his practices, as well as disquiet from among the ranks of other health professionals. However, during his period of time being a Director of Chelmsford, there were serious allegations of cover up by colleagues and serious failings of the State to investigate.

The Royal Commission said in its 12-volume report that patients at Chelmsford received large doses of barbiturates which put them in comas for up to two weeks. Bailey described this mental state as a "holiday". He said that the drugs "have very beautiful chemicals that allows us to produce very stylish results in people's mental functions". Bailey used deep sleep therapy (DST) for a variety of conditions, both psychiatric and non-psychiatric. Patients were put to sleep in a short-term coma-like state for up to two weeks or longer. While the patients were supposed to be woken up for toileting and daily nursing care, they were kept unconscious for at least two weeks.

DST made its first appearance in the media in November 1967 in The Sydney Morning Herald. The newspaper reported concerns about the excessive amount of drugs given to Ronald Carter, who was then 23 years old. He died in May 1967 while under deep sleep therapy. The drugs used in deep sleep therapy include Tuinal, Neulactil, Sodium Amyta, Placidyl, and Serenace. All of these substances were restricted under Schedule 4 of the Poisons Advisory Committee. Twenty-five patients died from Deep Sleep Therapy and hundreds suffered side effects. Bailey failed to wake patients daily, a standard practice in those days, which would have reduced the risks from pneumonia and bowel impaction.

== Outcomes ==
The Royal Commission into Mental Health Services would expose the current bureaucracy and medical profession to scrutiny. It might "sheet home to doctors, public servants and the various medical boards the consequences of what at worst has been a cover-up, and at best has been an exercise in negligence and incompetence."

The DST was Bailey's invention, a cocktail of barbiturates to put patients into a coma lasting up to 39 days, while also administering electro-convulsive therapy (ECT). Bailey likened the treatment to switching off a television; his self-developed theory was that the brain, by shutting down for an extended period, would "unlearn" habits that led to depression, addiction and other psychiatric conditions. Bailey claimed to have learnt DST from psychiatrists in Britain and Europe, though it was later found that only a mild variant was used there, sedating traumatised ex-soldiers for a few hours at a time, not the median 14 days under which Bailey and his colleague Dr John Herron subjected their 1,127 DST patients at Chelmsford between 1963 and 1979.

Approximately 24 patients died under care of Bailey, after being admitted for usually non-serious medical conditions (some within 4 days of being admitted), with 19 taking their lives by suicide within a year of treatment.

The Newhaven psychiatric hospital in Kew, Victoria, associated with quasi religious sect, The Family (Australian New Age group), "specialised in the use of LSD and psilocybin (magic mushrooms), Deep Sleep Therapy and ECT."

== Legacy ==
In June 2020, Due to a defamation case launched by two of the surviving doctors at Chelmsford against Author Steve Cannane for his book; Fair Game The Incredible Untold Story of Scientology in Australia, the findings of the Chelmsford Royal Commission have been the centre of attention around concerns about the validity of Royal Commissions. The Doctors claim that the inability of the Royal Commission to cross-examine witnesses at the stand, call witnesses to their defence, and denial of basic legal protections, including the privilege against self incrimination, meant that the processes of Royal Commissions are not just.

A key focus of the Royal Commission was the testimony of Nursing Assistant; Rosa Nicholson. Nicholson had stolen medical records from the Matron's office at Chelmsford Private Hospital and had reported the records to local newspaper, The Sydney Morning Herald. The Herald ran many pieces about the hospital which ultimately led to the commencement of the Royal Commission. Throughout the Royal Commission, Nicholson provided numerous testimonies about the conditions of care at Chelmsford, including the attitudes of senior executive staff and doctors at the hospital. However, these claims have been called in disrepute.

In Australian Writer Susan Gaeson's unpublished manuscript; Dark Trance, she reflects on a conversation she had with Ron Segal; the former president of the Australian Wing of the Citizens Commission on Human Rights, a Scientology affiliated organisation. In which he told Gaeson that he "was the mastermind behind the operation. It was he who decided to put Rosa into Chelmsford undercover ". His recollection of events coincides with Nicholson's family members who stated that she was involved with Ron Segal 'years prior' to working at Chelmsford, but contradicts with Nicholson's testimony at the Royal Commission where she stated that she only became involved with Segal after she had already worked in Chelmsford. Furthermore, numerous inconsistencies arose throughout Nicholson's testimony, including notably where she claimed she was present at a key meeting of senior Chelmsford staff where they discussed how they could edit patient documents to falsify consent. This claim was called into disrepute by numerous staff, including the former Matron at Chelmsford Private Hospital; Marcia Fawdry, who said 'She was a casual nursing assistant. It was a meeting of the executive held after hours, there is no way she would have been near there'.

Ultimately, Justice Slattery described Rosa's versions of events as 'mistaken', but did not question the validity of her testimonies. After the Royal Commission, Slattery referred Dr Herron to disciplinary hearings, and another doctor at the hospital to criminal proceedings on two manslaughter charges, although both charges got thrown out due to the lack of a fair trial caused by the media attention the Royal Commission had brought, and the time since the events had occurred, although Dr Herron had his medical license revoked in 1997 for unrelated reasons.
