= Cannane =

Cannane may refer to:

- Steve Cannane (born 1970), Australian television journalist
- The Cannanes, Australian indie rock band formed in 1984
