= Nerina Ramlakhan =

Dr Nerina Ramlakhan is a physiologist and sleep therapist. Nerina obtained her B.Sc. and Ph.D. from King's College London. She is the author of Tired But Wired: How to Overcome Your Sleep Problems: The Essential Toolkit. She is also Silentnight's "sleep expert".
