= Harry Bailey =

Australian psychiatrist (1922 - 1985)

Harry Richard Bailey
- Born: 29 October 1922; Picton, New South Wales, Australia
- Died: 8 September 1985 (aged 62); Mount White, New South Wales, Australia
- Education: University of Sydney
- Occupations: Medical Doctor, Hospital Administrator
- Known for: Deep Sleep Therapy
- Medical career
- Institutions: Tulane University; Chelmsworth Private Hospital (1962-1979)
- Sub-specialties: Psychiatry

Harry Richard Bailey (29 October 1922, Picton, New South Wales – 8 September 1985, Mount White, New South Wales) was an Australian psychiatrist and hospital administrator. He bore the primary responsibility for treatment of mental health patients and drug dependent clients via controversial deep sleep therapy and other methods at the Chelmsford Private Hospital in the Sydney North Shore suburb of Pennant Hills where he was its principal. The treatment has been linked with the deaths of a total of 85 patients, including 19 who died by suicide. Bailey died by suicide while he was being investigated.

One of Bailey's celebrity clients was Australian rock and pop singer and songwriter Stevie Wright, who was being treated for methadone addiction, a report that was later part of a 2013 documentary on Australian Story. Another of Bailey's high profile clients was Australian actress and singer Toni Lamond, who documented her stay at Bailey's clinic in her memoirs First Half.

== Early life and training ==
Bailey was born in Picton, New South Wales, to Jack Nelson Bailey, a stationmaster and railway officer, and Ruth Kathleen Bailey née Smith. He attended Christian Brothers College, Waverley, then enrolled in science at the University of Sydney in 1940. Unable to complete his studies at the time for financial reasons, he earned extra money by taking a position as a pharmacist's assistant. Then he went back to study medicine at Sydney University, graduating in medicine 1951 and in psychiatry in 1954. He was awarded the Norton Manning memorial prize for psychiatry and the Major Ian Vickery prize for paediatrics.

From December 1954, he spent fifteen months on a World Health Organization fellowship in North America and Europe, where he observed the sedation techniques, psychosurgery, and electroconvulsive therapy methods of Ewen Cameron in Canada, William Sargant in the UK, and Lars Leksell in Sweden.

Whereas most of his compatriots who specialized in psychiatry sought out their advanced further training in Britain, Bailey worked in Louisiana with Robert Heath of Tulane University. He also studied electroconvulsive therapy and surgical and pharmacological care under Sir William Trethowan and Cedric Howell Swanton back in Australia. Bailey had shunned psychoanalysis – also known as "the talking cure" – as a treatment for psychiatric problems, and instead chose to focus on what he deemed to be more conventionally practical and pragmatic treatments like drug therapy and "psychosurgery".

== Medical positions ==
In 1952, Bailey was assistant director of clinical psychiatry for the public health service. Between 1962 and 1979, he served as chief psychiatrist at Chelmsford Private Hospital, Pennant Hills, northwest of Sydney. Under his care, 26 patients died. The last of the deaths occurred in the early hours of 12 August 1977.

== Deep Sleep Therapy (DST) ==
Deep Sleep Therapy (DST) was Bailey's invention, a cocktail of barbiturates to put patients into a coma lasting up to 39 days, while also administering electro-convulsive therapy (ECT). Bailey likened the treatment to switching off a television; his self-developed theory was that the brain, by shutting down for an extended period, would "unlearn" habits that led to depression, addiction and other psychiatric conditions. Bailey claimed to have learnt DST from psychiatrists in Britain and Europe, though it was later found that only a mild variant was used there, sedating traumatised ex-soldiers for a few hours at a time, not the median 14 days under which Bailey and his colleague Dr John Herron subjected their 1,127 DST patients at Chelmsford between 1963 and 1979.

== Chelmsford investigation ==
The resultant scandal broke in the early 1980s, following two 60 Minutes programs in 1980 and 1982, and Chelmsford was closed down entirely. In 1985, the "legal and medical investigative machinery finally co-ordinated their actions and Bailey was facing committal proceedings over the death of Miriam Podio in 1977".

The Chelmsford Royal Commission, under the Greiner Government, from 1988 to 1990, headed by Justice John Slattery of the New South Wales Supreme Court, produced findings concerning Chelmsford's treatment program that ran to twelve volumes and included deplorable conditions, fraud and misconduct and medical negligence.

== Death ==
Bailey died by suicide, ingesting barbiturates at Mount White. He left a suicide note: "Let it be known that the Scientologists and the forces of madness have won". The Citizens Commission on Human Rights, a front group of the Church of Scientology, had been active in publicising the scandal. The government then banned the treatment and instigated stricter guidelines governing the administration and the care of mental patients.
