= Cedric Howell Swanton =

- Born: 23 March 1889; Kew, Victoria, Australia
- Died: 11 September 1970 (aged 81); Sydney, Australia
- Education: University of Melbourne, Tavistock Clinic
- Occupation: Medical doctor
- Years active: 1929–1959 (retirement)
- Medical career
- Institutions: Private Practice (Sydney, NSW) 1937–? Royal Prince Alfred Hospital
- Sub-specialties: Psychiatry

Dr Cedric Howell Swanton (Kew, Victoria, 23 March 1899 – Sydney, 11 September 1970) was an Australian physician and psychiatrist.

== Biography ==
Swanton was educated at Scotch College and the University of Melbourne, then went to the United Kingdom for postgraduate studies in surgery in London and Edinburgh. On his return to Australia in 1929 he worked as a general practitioner, but returned to London in 1933 to study psychiatry at the Tavistock Clinic.

In 1937 he opened a practice in Sydney as a consultant psychiatrist and was appointed to the honorary staff of the Royal Prince Alfred Hospital psychiatric clinic, remaining there until retiring in 1959.

Although trained in psychoanalysis, Swanton followed the theory of biological psychiatry, which maintained that mental problems were best treated by physical methods. He was one of the first Australian psychiatrists to use electroconvulsive therapy, persisting with this technique throughout the 1950s and mentoring some psychiatrists of the next generation, including the notorious Harry Bailey of the Chelmsworth Private Hospital, in its use. Swanton also performed leucotomy on many patients.
