= Bobby DeLaughter =

American prosecutor and judge (born 1954)

Robert Burt DeLaughter Sr. (born February 28, 1954, in Vicksburg, Mississippi) is an American politician, member of the Democratic Party, former state prosecutor and then Hinds County Circuit Judge. He prosecuted and secured the conviction in 1994 of Byron De La Beckwith, charged with the murder of the civil rights leader Medgar Evers on June 12, 1963. Two earlier trials in Mississippi in 1964 had resulted in hung juries.

== Early life and education ==
Robert Burt DeLaughter Sr. was born in Vicksburg, Mississippi, on February 28, 1954. He was the first son of Barney Roy DeLaughter and Billie Newman (Burt) DeLaughter, who later had another son Mike. Bobby's father was a commercial artist for a newspaper. The family moved to Jackson when Bobby was very young, and DeLaughter grew up being part of the city's white middle class. He was nine on June 12, 1963, when Medgar Evers was killed.

DeLaughter first saw the law in action when his ninth-grade civics teacher took the class to watch a trial at the Hinds County courthouse. That day convinced DeLaughter he wanted to practice law. He graduated from Wingfield High School in Jackson. DeLaughter attended undergraduate college and law school at the University of Mississippi. He became a member of the Sigma Chi fraternity.

== Marriage and family ==
During the summer of 1973, DeLaughter met Dixie Claire Townsend. They married on November 16, 1973, and their first child, Bobby Burt, was born on December 5, 1978. They also had a daughter, Claire, and a second son, Drew, together.

Due to their opposing views and his commitment on the Evers case, which Bobby started investigating in 1989 for a new trial, his and Dixie's marriage was strained. They divorced on April 15, 1991, and DeLaughter gained custody of their three children.

Later DeLaughter met Peggy Lloyd, a nurse, whom he married. Also divorced, she had three sons from her first marriage: Jared, Joel, and JJ.

== Career ==
Before graduating from law school in 1977, DeLaughter was given the opportunity to work on legal research for Alvin Binder. DeLaughter's father-in-law, Russell Moore, who was serving as a judge at the time, recommended him for the position.

In 1977 DeLaughter was admitted to the Mississippi Bar Association. DeLaughter worked as a criminal and civil defense lawyer for nearly ten years. In 1983 he had formed a firm, Kirksey & DeLaughter, with his colleague Bill Kirksey. By 1986, he wanted to leave private practice and sought a position as a prosecuting attorney.

In 1987, DeLaughter began working as a prosecutor under Ed Peters, the district attorney of Hinds County. He was assigned to the Evers case, which he began investigating in 1989. His strong commitment to the case contributed to the break-up of his marriage.

DeLaughter is best known for leading the state's successful prosecution of Byron De La Beckwith for the assassination of civil rights leader Medgar Evers in 1994, more than 30 years after the crime. Two previous trials in 1964 following the event had resulted in hung juries; at the time, all the jury members were white because blacks had been prevented from voting in Mississippi and thus could not serve on juries. The state retried the case in 1994 based on new evidence.

In 1999, Governor Kirk Fordice appointed DeLaughter to a position as Hinds County Court Judge, after the incumbent judge died. In 2002, DeLaughter was appointed a Circuit Court judge for Hinds County.

=== Bribery charges ===
On March 28, 2008, DeLaughter was suspended from the bench indefinitely by the Mississippi Supreme Court due to allegations of bribery and judicial misconduct. On February 12, 2009, DeLaughter pleaded not guilty to a five-count federal indictment; these charges were linked to the criminal investigation of disgraced tort attorney Richard Scruggs. On July 30, 2009, he pleaded guilty to one obstruction of justice charge. On November 13, 2009, DeLaughter was sentenced to 18 months in federal prison by Judge Glen Davidson. In keeping with the recommendation of his plea agreement, Judge Davidson did not impose a financial penalty on DeLaughter due to his negative net worth. He was incarcerated in the federal prison at McCreary and was released on April 13, 2011. The Mississippi Supreme Court in March 2010 removed him from his judgeship and three months later permanently disbarred him.

=== Later career ===
Following his release from prison, in April 2011, DeLaughter and his family relocated to New Orleans where he restores aged structures into apartments.

== Media and works ==
In 1996, the events surrounding the De La Beckwith trial were memorialized in the Rob Reiner film Ghosts of Mississippi. Alec Baldwin portrayed DeLaughter in the film.

In 2001, his biography about the Evers prosecution, Never Too Late: A Prosecutor’s Story of Justice in the Medgar Evers Trial was published.

In 2014, DeLaughter self-published his debut novel, Inside the Labyrinth: A Bo Landry Erotic Thriller.
