= Richard Scruggs =

American lawyer

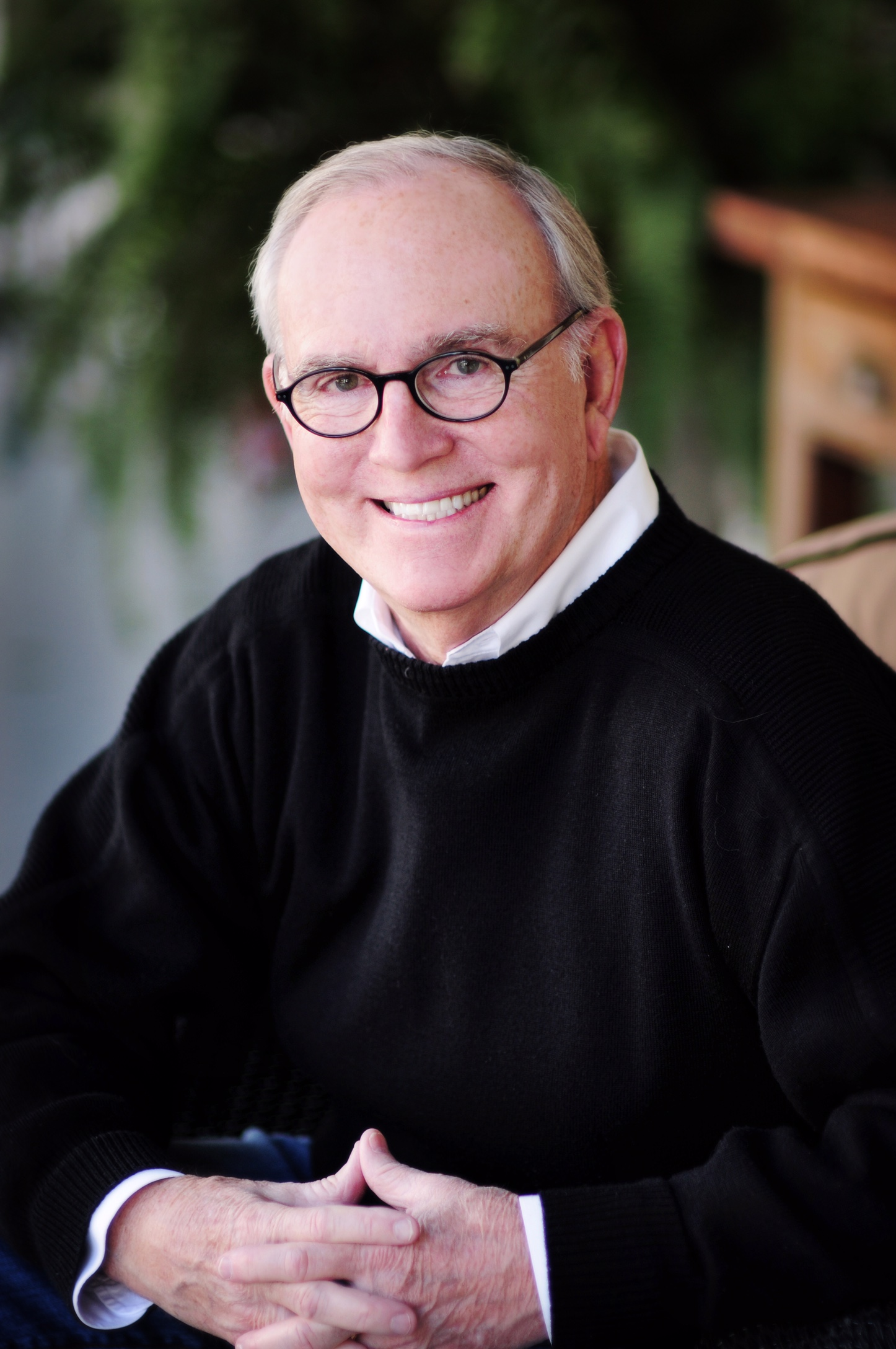
- Born: May 17, 1946 (age 80); Brookhaven, Mississippi, U.S.
- Other name: Dickie
- Education: University of Mississippi
- Occupations: Former attorney, philanthropist
- Known for: Class action lawsuits against the asbestos, tobacco and insurance industries
- Spouse: Diane Thompson
- Partner(s): Helen, Houston Scruggs
- Children: 2

Richard F. "Dickie" Scruggs (born May 17, 1946) is an American former naval aviator and disbarred trial lawyer. He is the brother-in-law of former U.S. Senate Majority Leader Trent Lott. Scruggs first came to the public eye after successfully suing the asbestos industry on behalf of ill shipyard workers. He later represented the state of Mississippi in the tobacco litigation of the 1990s. He also represented hundreds of homeowners in lawsuits against insurance companies following Hurricane Katrina, and a national class action of patients against HMOs in the early 2000s.

Scruggs' legal career was derailed by his indictment in a judicial bribery scheme in 2007. Scruggs pled guilty to conspiracy to bribe Circuit Judge Henry L. Lackey in 2008. He also entered a 2009 guilty plea for a scheme to influence Circuit Judge Bobby DeLaughter.

Scruggs was sentenced to five years in prison on June 27, 2008, by U.S. District Judge Neal Brooks Biggers Jr.; and on February 10, 2009, Judge Glen H. Davidson sentenced him to seven years for the second scheme, to run concurrently. He served six years in federal prison and was released in 2014.

Kings of Tort, by Alan Lange and Tom Dawson, released in 2009, documents the rise and fall of Scruggs. The Fall of the House of Zeus: The Rise and Ruin of America's Most Powerful Trial Lawyer, by veteran journalist Curtis Wilkie, was published in 2010.

== Early life and education ==
Scruggs was born in Brookhaven, Mississippi, on May 17, 1946, but grew up in Pascagoula, Mississippi. He told Time that his father left the family when Scruggs was five years old. Scruggs was then raised by his mother, Helen, who worked as a legal secretary at the Ingalls shipyard.

Scruggs was a member of Sigma Alpha Epsilon as an undergraduate at the University of Mississippi. Upon graduation and commissioning as a naval officer, Scruggs entered flight training and earned his wings as an A6 bomber pilot in 1970. Scruggs was assigned to an aircraft carrier in the Mediterranean Sea during the Yom Kippur War, where he was stationed aboard the carrier Franklin D. Roosevelt during the nuclear alert triggered by the Soviet threat to intervene in the Arab–Israeli War.

He graduated from the University of Mississippi Law School in 1976, where he was a classmate of Mike Moore, a close friend who later became the attorney general of Mississippi.

== Legal career ==
Scruggs began his career with a prestigious law firm in Jackson, Mississippi, where he often defended insurance companies. Later he moved back to Pascagoula and opened his own office.

=== Asbestos litigation ===
One of his first big legal victories was in representing workers at the Pascagoula shipyard who became fatally ill as a result of exposure to asbestos fibers. He encountered his first client in 1984 when he was approached by a shipyard worker looking for help with a lung disease. Scruggs paid for the client's medical tests which revealed the medical ailment to be asbestosis. Scruggs took on 4200 direct clients and served as co-counsel to another 6000.

Soon after taking office as state attorney general, Moore hired Scruggs on a contingency basis to assist in efforts to remove asbestos from public places and pursue efforts to get asbestos producers to fund the necessary renovations. Scruggs eventually won a settlement and earned $6 million from the state in legal fees. State Auditor Steve Patterson felt the arrangement was unethical, as Moore had no specific legal authority to contract out the work of his office to private attorneys and Scruggs had donated $20,000 to his 1991 campaign fund. In 1992, Patterson began working with the Hinds County district attorney to build a criminal case against Moore and Scruggs. Presley Blake, a political consultant who had once been represented by Scruggs in bankruptcy proceedings, interceded and arranged for Patterson and Scruggs to meet. The meeting resulted in Patterson dropping the inquiry and Scruggs reducing his fee for the state by $63,000.

=== Tobacco litigation ===
In the 1990s, Scruggs was hired by Mississippi Attorney General Mike Moore to assist with a lawsuit against thirteen tobacco companies for state-borne health care costs. Scruggs and his colleagues brought a concerted action, representing several states, which resulted in a settlement of over $248 billion. His performance in this case was portrayed by actor Colm Feore in the movie The Insider. Scruggs himself, as well as his second house in Pascagoula, Mississippi, also appeared in the film.

In total, Scruggs' firm Scruggs, Millette, Bozeman and Dent earned about $900 million in legal fees from the judgments, with about one third going to Scruggs. The total in fees Scruggs received resulted in public controversy regarding the amount that lawyers are allowed to take from large settlements. Scruggs stated that his firm held a reserve to help challenge future cases and cover costs, allowing additional financial leverage in addressing the legal infractions of major corporations.

=== Ritalin lawsuits/medical care litigation ===
A short time after the tobacco lawsuit, Scruggs led and became a spokesman for the plaintiffs in the Ritalin class action lawsuits. He asserted that the makers of Ritalin "manufactured a disease" and that Ritalin "has been grossly over-prescribed. It is a huge risk." Following a ruling by the Illinois Supreme Court stating that HMOs could be sued, as opposed to only doctors, Scruggs led a new set of lawsuits against American HMOs. In June 2004, Scruggs also led a lawsuit against 13 non-profit hospital groups, alleging they hoarded funds gained from tax breaks while dispensing inadequate care. All five class actions in five states were dismissed before trial.

=== Katrina litigation ===
In the aftermath of Hurricane Katrina, Scruggs filed a number of lawsuits against insurance companies regarding payment on claims made for storm damage. One of his clients was his brother-in-law Senator Trent Lott, former Majority Leader of the US Senate and Lott's wife, Tricia, in a lawsuit against State Farm Insurance. Numerous other clients and cases followed, most of which resulted in favorable settlements; however, Scruggs eventually dropped the Lott case following his indictment and disqualification.

=== Other litigation ===
In 2003, Scruggs tried and won a national class action against Lehman Brothers, with a verdict of $51 million for financing a predatory lending scheme.

== Bribery and wire fraud ==
At the conclusion of one of the Katrina-related trials, a fee dispute arose between Scruggs and other plaintiff's attorneys involved in the case. That fee dispute resulted in a separate trial to determine how to apportion the fees. According to allegations that later surfaced in a criminal prosecution, Scruggs was involved in an attempt to bribe Mississippi Third Circuit Court Judge Henry L. Lackey with $40,000 in exchange for a favorable ruling in the fee dispute. Lackey had contacted the local U.S. Attorney’s office about an improper communication from a third party associated with Scruggs, and at the U.S. Attorney’s request, Lackey solicited a bribe of $40,000 through the third party. Scruggs, who was later recorded saying he would “take care of” what he was told was a request from the judge for an additional payment, pleaded guilty in Federal Court on March 14, 2008. On June 26, 2008, he was sentenced to five years in prison for the bribery charge.

In a separate federal indictment, Scruggs was accused of attempting to improperly influence Mississippi judge Bobby DeLaughter. On February 10, 2009, Scruggs pleaded guilty in federal court in Aberdeen, Mississippi, to one count of that indictment charging mail fraud in the corruption of a public official. Scruggs was sentenced to a seven-year term to run concurrently with the five-year sentence, adding two years to the total (the maximum penalty was 20 years/$250,000 fine). He was also fined $100,000. Judge Glen H. Davidson imposed his sentence and quoted the Scottish theologian William Barclay: "The Romans had a proverb that money was like sea water. The more you drink the thirstier you become." The conviction also resulted in Scruggs Hall, which housed the music department of the University of Mississippi, being renamed "The Music Building".

In December 2012, a federal judge granted Scruggs' motion to be released from prison on bail pending his appeal of the 2009 conviction. The appeal was unsuccessful and Scruggs returned to jail in April 2013 to complete his sentence. Scruggs was released from jail and placed under house arrest on March 20, 2014. His sentence was completed on September 14, 2014.

== Political activity ==
Scruggs has made monetary contributions to the presidential campaigns of Joe Biden and John McCain; the senatorial campaigns of Hillary Clinton, John Kerry, Biden, and McCain; and to numerous other candidates from both major political parties. He also reportedly contributed to Tom Daschle, Susan Collins, and Harry Reid.

Scruggs was scheduled to host a fundraiser at his home for Senator Clinton's presidential campaign, on December 15, 2007, to be attended by former President Bill Clinton. However, that fundraiser was canceled after Scruggs' indictment.

In the months following Scruggs' indictment, both the McCain and the Biden campaigns returned his contributions.

== Personal life ==
In 1971 he married Diane Thompson, a sister of Tricia Thompson Lott, wife of Trent Lott.

Scruggs lived in a $5 million mansion in Oxford, Mississippi. In 2003, he bought the upper floor of a building on Courthouse Square in Oxford in which he housed the Scruggs Law Firm. In 2010, the space was purchased by the firm of W. Roberts Wilson, Jr. following the 2009 settlement of Wilson's longstanding suit against Scruggs for fees resulting from asbestos cases in the 1980s.

Scruggs and his wife, Diane, were ardent supporters of the University of Mississippi and made large donations to several organizations on campus. Scruggs Hall, which currently houses the music department, was named in their honor. The Scruggs name was removed from the building following Scruggs guilty plea to bribery in March 2007. The building is now called "The Music Building".

John Grisham reported that Scruggs, while serving his sentence in federal prison, worked to help inmates get GED certificates, and expressed astonishment at the low level of literacy among the inmates. Scruggs took long walks with other white-collar inmates. He taught nonviolent offenders, many who were imprisoned on drug charges, helping them to acquire their GEDs, and nearly 60 students under his tutelage graduated. Scruggs has partnered with the Mississippi Integrated Basic Education and Skills Training program (MIBEST), which provides a remedial education and marketable skills to students seeking a GED.

== Works cited ==
- Crockett, James R. (2014). Power, Greed, and Hubris: Judicial Bribery in Mississippi (reprint ed.). University Press of Mississippi. ISBN 9781617039188.
