= Citizens Commission on Human Rights =

Scientology-related organization

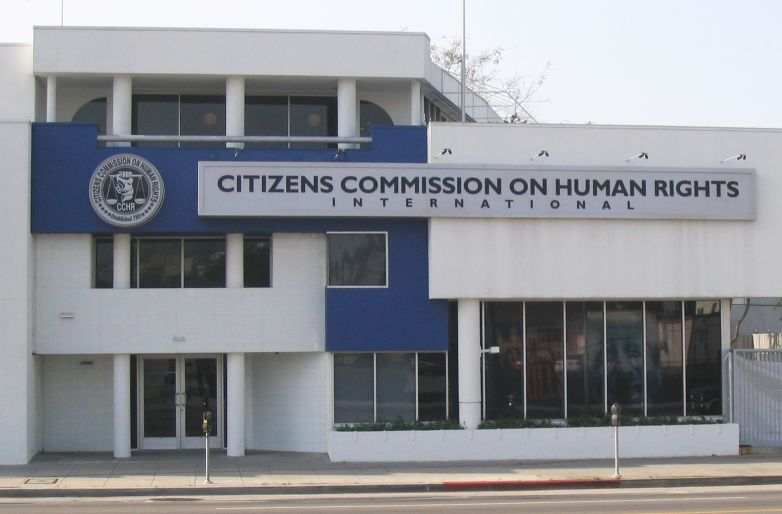
- CCHR International's Los Angeles building (2005)
- Formation: 1982 [1969] (Note: "Citizens Commission on Human Rights" was incorporated in California in 1982. A slightly different named corporation "The Citizens Commission on Human Rights" was registered in the District of Columbia on 6/11/1970 (since dissolved; no date given), as well as registered in California as a foreign corporation on 12/3/1970 (forfeited on 2/1/1973).)
- Legal status: Nonprofit corporation
- Purpose: Anti-psychiatry
- Location: 6616 W Sunset Boulevard, Los Angeles, California
- Coordinates: 34.0976°N 118.334°W
- Website: cchr.org

Citizens Commission on Human Rights (CCHR) is a lobbying organization founded in 1969 by the Church of Scientology and psychiatrist Thomas Szasz. (Note: Szasz was not a Scientologist himself, and he later distanced himself from the church, but he shared Scientology's critical view of psychiatry.) Headquartered in Los Angeles, California, its stated mission is to "eradicate abuses committed under the guise of mental health and enact patient and consumer protections." It is regarded by most non-Scientologists as a Scientology front group whose purpose is to push the organization's anti-psychiatry agenda.

== Campaigns ==
CCHR promotional leaflet, inviting members of the public to "report psychiatric abuse"

The group has organized media campaigns against various psychiatrists, psychiatric organizations and pharmaceutical companies, including Eli Lilly, the manufacturer of Prozac. The campaign against Eli Lilly in 1991 caused Prozac's market share of antidepressants to drop from 25% to 21%.

The group campaigned against the use of Ritalin for the treatment of attention-deficit hyperactivity disorder, a disorder which the organization dismisses as nonexistent. The campaign was part of the Ritalin class action lawsuits against Novartis (the manufacturer of Ritalin), CHADD (Children and Adults with Attention-Deficit/Hyperactivity Disorder), and the American Psychiatric Association (APA); all five lawsuits were dismissed in 2002.

In 2003, CCHR presented a report with the title "The Silent Death of America's Children" to the New Freedom Commission on Mental Health, with case histories of several dozen under-aged psychiatric patients who had died as a result of psychotropic drug treatment and restraint measures in the 1990s and early 2000s.

In 2004, Massachusetts state senators Richard T. Moore and Charles E. Shannon Jr. sponsored a bill requiring doctors to provide parents with information about a psychotropic medication's side effects and obtain their signature before prescribing any psychotropic drugs. Though Moore claimed in an interview to be unaware of CCHR's involvement, Shannon had worked with CCHR on the legislation. Kevin Hall, New England Director for CCHR, claimed to have drafted the bill. The medical establishment widely disagreed with the bill, which it dubbed the "Scientology Bill". Others opposing the bill included the Massachusetts Department of Mental Health, the Massachusetts Psychiatric Society, the American Academy of Pediatrics and the Parent/Professional Advocacy League.

On 5 October 2006, National Mental Health Screening Day, CCHR picketed outside of Riverside Community Care in Wakefield, Massachusetts, holding a protest rally against mental health screening. According to journalist Gary Band in the Wakefield Observer, "The protest fell somewhat flat because Riverside has not conducted these screenings since 2001."

According to an article published in the journal Mental Health, Religion & Culture, "in rare instances, CCHR (and thereby Scientology) has uncovered real instances of questionable (if not dire) psychiatric care, which bolstered its credibility", specifically the exposing of abuses at Chelmsford in 1978; conversely, CCHR has been accused of using pseudoscience and false information to disingenuously validate their claims.

In its early years, CCHR claimed victory in a 1969 Pennsylvania case involving Victor Győry, a Hungarian refugee who had been involuntarily committed to a psychiatric hospital in April 1969. The police officers committing Győry said he had tried to kill himself. Doctors at Haverford State Hospital failed to realize that Győry spoke very little English and was speaking in Hungarian. They judged him "incoherent" and diagnosed him with paranoid schizophrenia. The hospital refused Győry's request for legal representation, and administered drugs and electroshock treatment to him against his will over a three-month period. An aide at the hospital eventually notified CCHR. CCHR's general counsel John Joseph Matonis secured Győry's release through a writ of habeas corpus.

CCHR continued to lobby for legislative reform on mental health issues such as the keeping of detailed computer records on involuntarily committed patients and their families, and drug experimentation without patients' consent. CCHR would typically request a tour of a psychiatric hospital, issue a public report based on patient testimony and other sources, and then push for legal investigations and reform. The early focus was on involuntary commitment procedures.

=== Chelmsford Hospital and DST ===
From 1988 to 1990 the Australian government held the Chelmsford Royal Commission inquiry into Deep Sleep Therapy (DST). For a decade prior, CCHR had been pushing for an investigation of the Chelmsford Private Hospital in New South Wales, and its head, Dr. Harry Bailey, who had been practising DST from 1963 to 1979.

The inquiry discovered that deep sleep therapy had killed 24 patients, not counting patients who had killed themselves, and close to a thousand had had brain damage. Of the former patients, 152 received reparations from a fund totaling in excess of 5 million dollars.

Chelmsford Hospital was forced to close in 1990, and two of its psychiatric staff were made to face charges in 1992. Dr. Bailey himself stepped down in 1979 due to CCHR's protest campaign, and committed suicide by drug overdose in 1985, the night before he was subpoenaed to appear in court. His suicide note read, in part: "Let it be known that the Scientologists and the forces of madness have won."

== Controversies ==
In a 2006 essay, Evolution of the Antipsychiatry Movement Into Mental Health Consumerism, Rissmiller & Rissmiller label CCHR as a radical antipsychiatry organization. It encourages the arrest and incarceration of psychiatrists for their alleged crimes against humanity because L. Ron Hubbard had written, "There is not one institutional psychiatrist alive who ... could not be arraigned and convicted of extortion, mayhem and murder."

CCHR is a front group for the Church of Scientology, which sponsors the organization. In 1993, the US Internal Revenue Service granted CCHR tax exemption as part of an agreement with the Church of Scientology International and Religious Technology Center (RTC) under which the RTC took responsibility for CCHR's tax liabilities.

CCHR has been criticized by journalist Andrew Gumbel for "crudeness" and "paranoia" in its criticism of psychiatry.

In 1988, CCHR claimed that Professor Sir Martin Roth of Newcastle University had used LSD in tests on mental patients in the 1960s. The statements were publicized in the Northern Echo newspaper, which was ordered by an English court to pay "very substantial" libel damages to Roth after the court found that CCHR's claims were "highly defamatory" and "utterly false."

Jan Eastgate, President of CCHR and winner of an International Association of Scientologists Freedom Medal award, has been implicated in covering up the sexual abuse of an 11-year-old girl in the Australian branch of the church. Eastgate was head of the Australian CCHR at the time and the girl was abused by her Scientologist stepfather between the ages of 8 and 11 years. Eastgate, who denied the allegations, labelling them "egregiously false", was arrested on 30 March 2011 on charges of perverting the course of justice but later released on conditional bail. All charges were dropped against Eastgate after an investigation by the New South Wales Director of Public Prosecution found that there was not enough substantiating evidence.

In the immediate aftermath of the September 11 attacks, CCHR promulgated a conspiracy theory assigning responsibility for the attacks to Ayman al-Zawahiri, alleging that, as Osama bin Laden's personal psychiatrist (although he is actually a surgeon), he was the principal mastermind behind the attacks and had brainwashed bin Laden using pain, drugs and hypnosis.

== Psychiatry: An Industry of Death ==
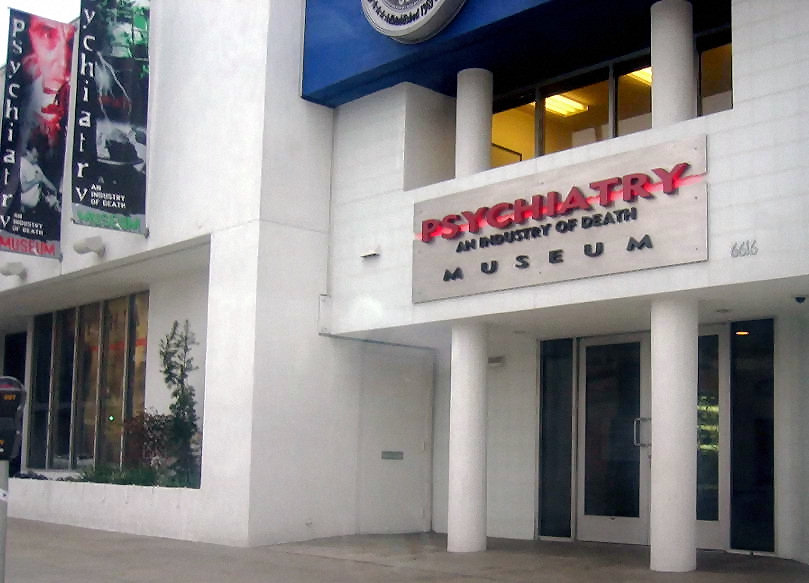
Exhibit entrance (2006)

Housed in CCHR's Los Angeles building is the Psychiatry: An Industry of Death exhibit which was opened in 2005.

I was charged with overseeing building a new museum—the Psychiatry: An Industry of Death Museum. The entire presentation was designed to document how psychiatry is "driven by profit" rather than by care for patient well-being. Every video, artifact, and display was an overblown attempt to show how the profession is to blame for the Holocaust, for destroying artists through barbaric "treatments," for hooking children on drugs, and much, much more. There are small kernels of truth contained in the hype—just enough to give it a speck of credibility—while creating the impression that all psychiatrists are conniving monsters out of B movies. I put together a team and approved the design and content of this extraordinary spectacle of over-the-top propaganda.

— Mike Rinder

Of the anti-psychiatry exhibit, Andrew Gumbel of Los Angeles City Beat stated "it is one thing to assert that psychiatry has had its abuses, quite another to say the profession in and of itself is evil ... this is the classic stuff of paranoid conspiracy theory".

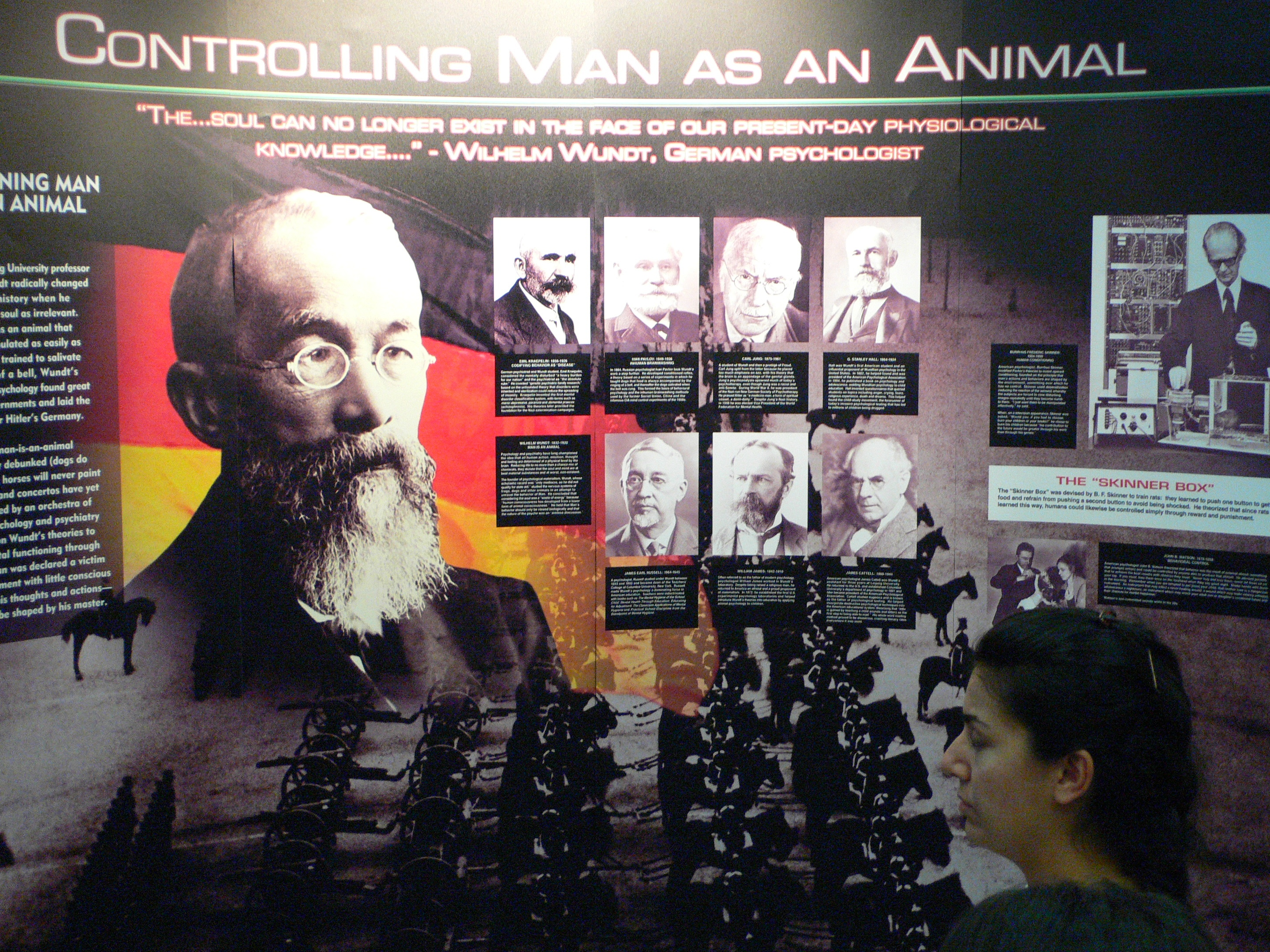
Exhibit at Worldcon 2006

CCHR also has a travelling exhibit of the same name, which National Post writer Kevin Libin called "a fright show" where they show the 2006 two-hour film of the same name, Psychiatry: An Industry of Death. Two individuals featured in the film, Holocaust scholar Michael Berenbaum and bioethics scholar Arthur Caplan, have rejected the attack on psychiatry and psychology. Berenbaum stated that "I have known psychiatrists to be of enormous assistance to people deeply important to me in my life," and Caplan complained that he had been taped without being told what the film was about, and called the producers "smarmy and dishonest."

== Documentaries ==
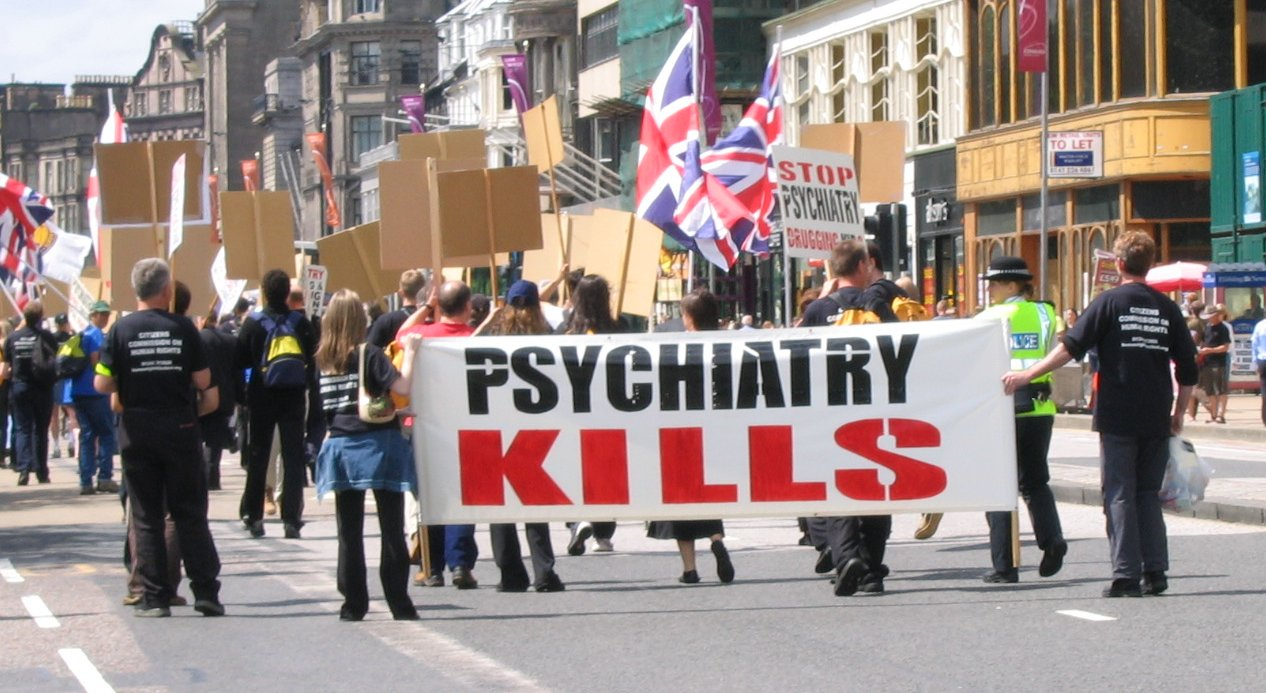
Demonstration by CCHR

CCHR have produced a number of documentaries promoting their view of modern psychiatry. These include:

- The Hidden Enemy,
- Making A Killing,
- Prescription for Violence,
- The Marketing of Madness (see chapter below),
- Dead Wrong, and
- Psychiatry: An Industry of Death, which was made to accompany the exhibit of the same name.

=== The Marketing of Madness: Are We All Insane? ===
The Marketing of Madness is a documentary which alleges that the mental health industry is an unscientific field driven solely by the profit motive, to the detriment of patients.

One of the interviewees is Claudia Keyworth, an advocate of 'Bio-Energetic medicine' who believes that healing is best accomplished using the "energy field of the human body". On the topic of mental illness, she asserts: "they say you have a chemical imbalance of serotonin and dopamine, but there's never been a study to prove that, ever."

Simplistic "chemical imbalance" explanations for mental disorders have never received empirical support; most prominent psychiatrists, neuroscientists, and psychologists have not espoused such ill-defined, facile etiological theories. However, this theory has been widely promoted by the press, advertising and professionals so that the majority of the general western public believes in it.

The documentary claims that psychiatrists have convinced the public that normal negative human experiences are mental illnesses. An example used in the movie is the assertion that psychiatrists seek to label typical shyness as a "social anxiety disorder"; however, patients are diagnosed with a social anxiety disorder only at debilitating levels, where there is an "intense fear in social situations". Unlike a shy individual, a person diagnosed with social anxiety disorder is likely to experience symptoms such as nausea, stammering, and panic attacks.

== See also ==
- Scientology and psychiatry
- Controversy surrounding psychiatry
