= Ritalin class-action lawsuits =

The Ritalin class-action lawsuits were a series of federal lawsuits in 2000, filed in five separate US states. All five lawsuits were dismissed by the end of 2002. The lawsuits alleged that the makers of methylphenidate (brand name Ritalin) and the American Psychiatric Association had conspired to invent and promote the disorder ADHD to create a highly profitable market for the drug. The lawsuit also alleged that CHADD (children and adults with attention deficit/hyperactivity disorder) deliberately attempted to increase the supply of Ritalin and ease restrictions on the supply of Ritalin to help increase profits for Novartis.

== Previous lawsuits and history of class action ==
Beginning in the 1980s, a series of lawsuits were filed based on the perceived harmful side effects of Ritalin. John Coale, who had participated in one of these lawsuits, joined what became an ever larger contingent of lawyers involved in what was then a growing series of Ritalin class action lawsuits. In the late 1990s, there was a significant increase in production of Ritalin. A minority but vocal group of critics perceived that a crisis was on hand. Coale also expressed alarm, "They were giving this stuff away like candy". The Church of Scientology advocacy organization, Citizens Commission on Human Rights, and anti-psychiatry critics believed Ritalin to be highly dangerous and completely unnecessary. Coale seemed to share these beliefs as he stated the purpose of the lawsuit to be; "...to put [Ritalin] off the market." The St. Petersburg Times wrote at that time that Coale, like his wife Greta Van Susteren, was a practicing Scientologist. Richard Scruggs, like John Coale, and a few other lawyers who participated in the Ritalin class action lawsuits, had previously helped win a landmark settlement from the asbestos and tobacco industries, Ritalin was to be the next major battleground. Scruggs would lead and also become a spokesman for the plaintiffs. He asserted the Ritalin defendants, "manufactured a disease"...and "it has been grossly over-prescribed. It is a huge risk." Peter Breggin who is a noted psychiatrist and industry critic, was hired as a medical consultant by the firm and was also involved as a consultant in the other lawsuits.

The first class action was filed in Texas by the law firm Waters & Kraus in 2000. They created a webpage called Ritalinfraud.com which had an online form to seek additional participants in class action lawsuits. According to Breggin, plaintiff Andy Waters had previously read his book Talking back to Ritalin before filing his lawsuit. The firm believed that the improper conduct of Novartis rivaled the improper conduct of the tobacco and asbestos industries and that the drug company could be liable for billions of dollars. The firm claimed that Novartis specifically took the following steps to dramatically increase the sale of Ritalin.

== Novartis and APA respond ==
A spokesperson for Novartis responded to the Texas suit, "Ritalin has been used safely and effectively in the treatment of millions of ADHD patients for over 40 years, and is the most studied drug prescribed for the disorder."

The American Psychiatric Association stated, "the allegation that it had conspired with Novartis to create the ADHD diagnosis was "ludicrous and totally false," and said there existed "a mountain of scientific evidence to refute these meritless allegations."

== Outcome ==
The first suit to be dismissed occurred in California in 2001. U.S. District Judge Rudi Brewster dismissed the suit under California's anti-SLAPP statute. A SLAPP (strategic lawsuit against public participation) is a form of litigation filed to intimidate and silence a less powerful critic by so severely burdening them with the cost of a legal defense that they abandon their criticism. The Anti-SLAPP statute is designed to eliminate potential lawsuits that are in reality political actions by stopping them early in court procedures. Judge Brewster dismissed the suit stating that the defendants' speech is "protected under both the United States and California Constitutions" and that plaintiffs "failed to state a cause of action." In addition to dismissing the suit, the court also ordered that the plaintiffs pay the legal fees for Novartis, APA and CHADD.

In the conclusion to one of the other lawsuits, Judge Tagla stated "that the allegations were fully without merit. Plaintiffs failed to provide any concrete statements to document their claims."

By 2002 all five class action lawsuits had been dismissed or had been withdrawn. A Novartis spokesperson stated;"...the fact that all five of the class action lawsuits have been dismissed, sends a strong message that the decision of how to treat ADHD is between the parent, patient and physician, and has no place in the courts."

== See also ==
- List of class-action lawsuits
