= Deep sleep therapy =

Psychiatric treatment

Deep sleep therapy (DST), also called prolonged sleep treatment or continuous narcosis, is a discredited form of ostensibly psychiatric treatment in which drugs are used to keep patients unconscious for a period of days or weeks. The controversial practice led to the death of 25 patients in Chelmsford Private Hospital in New South Wales, Australia, from the early 1960s to late 1970s.

== History ==
Induction of sleep for psychiatric purposes was first tried by Scottish psychiatrist Neil Macleod at the turn of the 20th century. He used sodium bromide to induce sleep in a few psychiatric patients, one of whom died. His method was adopted by some other physicians but soon abandoned, perhaps because it was considered too toxic or reckless. In 1915, Giuseppe Epifanio tried barbiturate-induced sleep therapy in a psychiatric clinic in Italy, but his reports made little impact. Electronarcosis was also developed and used for various psychiatric disorders, involving current passed through the brain to induce deep sleep.

Deep sleep therapy was popularised in the early 1920s by Swiss psychiatrist Jakob Klaesi, using a combination of two barbiturates marketed as Somnifen by the pharmaceutical company Roche. Most of the patients that were treated had schizophrenia. The method became widely known and was used in some mental hospitals in the 1930s and 1940s. It was adopted and promoted by some leading psychiatrists in the 1950s and 1960s, such as William Sargant in the United Kingdom and by Donald Ewen Cameron, a North American psychiatrist of Scottish origin practising in Canada, some of whose research was funded by the Central Intelligence Agency (CIA) as part of their Project MKULTRA.

Sargant wrote in his standard textbook An introduction to physical methods of treatment in psychiatry:

Many patients unable to tolerate a long course of ECT, can do so when anxiety is relieved by narcosis ... What is so valuable is that they generally have no memory about the actual length of the treatment or the numbers of ECT used ... After 3 or 4 treatments they may ask for ECT to be discontinued because of an increasing dread of further treatments. Combining sleep with ECT avoids this ... All sorts of treatment can be given while the patient is kept sleeping, including a variety of drugs and ECT [which] together generally induce considerable memory loss for the period under narcosis. As a rule the patient does not know how long he has been asleep, or what treatment, even including ECT, he has been given. Under sleep ... one can now give many kinds of physical treatment, necessary, but often not easily tolerated. We may be seeing here a new exciting beginning in psychiatry and the possibility of a treatment era such as followed the introduction of anaesthesia in surgery.

== Australian Chelmsford scandal ==
Deep sleep therapy was also practiced (in combination with electroconvulsive therapy (ECT) and other therapies) by Dr Harry Bailey between 1962 and 1979 in Pennant Hills, New South Wales, at the Chelmsford Private Hospital. As practiced by Bailey, deep sleep therapy involved long periods of barbiturate-induced unconsciousness. It was prescribed for various conditions including schizophrenia, depression, obesity, premenstrual stress syndrome and addiction.

=== Resultant deaths ===
Twenty-five patients died at Chelmsford Private Hospital during the 1960s and 1970s. After the failure of the agencies of medical and criminal investigation to tackle complaints about Chelmsford, a series of articles in the early 1980s in the Sydney Morning Herald and television coverage on 60 Minutes exposed the abuses at the hospital, including 24 deaths from the treatment. That forced the authorities to take action, and the Chelmsford Royal Commission was appointed. The Citizens Commission on Human Rights, co-founded by the Church of Scientology and Professor of Psychiatry Emeritus Dr. Thomas Szasz in 1969, was an advocate for victims; it received documents from the hospital, copied by a nurse, "Rosa".

In 1978, Sydney psychiatrist Brian Boettcher had convened a meeting of doctors working at Chelmsford and found there was little support for deep sleep therapy (Bailey did not attend). However, the treatment continued to be used into 1979.

Legal action on behalf of former patients was pursued in New South Wales.

=== Patient testimony ===
In her book First Half, Toni Lamond described what it was like when she was admitted there in 1970. She had an addiction to prescription drugs and a friend told her about Bailey and he became her psychiatrist.

I was given a semi-private room. On the way to it I saw several beds along the corridors with sleeping patients. The patient in the other bed in my room was also asleep. I thought nothing of it at the time. Although it was mid-morning, the stillness was eerie for a hospital that looked to be full to overflowing. I was given a handful of pills to take and the next thing I remember was Dr Bailey standing by the bed asking how I felt. I told him I'd had a good night's sleep. He laughed and informed me it was ten days later and, what's more, he had taken some weight off me. I was checked out of the hospital and this time noticed the other patients were still asleep or being taken to the bathroom while out on their feet.

A 1992 British television documentary included the testimony of several former patients and relatives of those who died from treatment at Chelmsford Hospital.

=== 2011 controversy ===
In New South Wales in 2011, following the publication of a story in the Sydney Morning Herald, the Minister for Police and Emergency Services, representing the Minister for Health, in answer to a parliamentary question on notice, made a statement on the use of court-ordered prolonged sedation with ECT:

Prolonged sedation is used on rare occasions with the administration of ECT where there has been a clinical indication to combine the two procedures, such as in complex cases when the risk to the patient and others from severe mental illness is extreme and other treatments have been unable to safely contain this risk. The primary purpose of the sedation is to keep the patient and staff safe from the patient's severe aggression and to control agitation. The primary purpose of the ECT is to treat the underlying mental illness.

The minister said that all three cases had positive outcomes and "accepted procedures and clinical governance processes available at the time were followed". The New South Wales Mental Health Review Tribunal has power to approve or prohibit administration of ECT treatment in respect to both voluntary and involuntary patients.

=== HarperCollins Publishers and Steve Cannane ===
In 2017, doctors John Gill and John Herron, previously involved in the Chelmsford scandal, presented charges of defamation against author Steve Cannane and publisher HarperCollins following the publication of the book Fair Game: The Incredible Untold Story of Scientology in Australia. In his book, Cannane refers to the roles Chelmsford Royal Commission and Church of Scientology played in exposing the practices taking place at Chelmsford Private Hospital. In late 2020, judge Jayne Jagot dismissed the defamation case, finding that the claims were substantially true and that Cannane was entitled to trust the royal commission's findings, stating that the accusers tried to "rewrite history and vindicate their conduct", and ordered costs to be paid by Gill and Herron. An appeal was lodged, and in 2022 the court found that Gill was entitled to a retrial. The lawsuit was settled out of court.

== See also ==
- Insulin shock therapy
