= Steve Cannane =

News journalist

Personal details
- Born: 1970
- Occupation: Journalist

Stephen Paul Cannane (born 1970) is a news journalist and current affairs reporter for the Australian Broadcasting Corporation. He is the chief of the ABC's Europe bureau, based in London. Cannane had previously been the ABC's Europe correspondent, a reporter for the ABC's Investigations unit, a host of The Drum and a reporter at Lateline.

== Politics ==
Cannane is a grandson of Pat Hills, a former Lord Mayor of Sydney and Deputy Premier of New South Wales.

At the age of 22, Cannane was persuaded to run as the Australian Labor Party candidate for Warringah in the 1993 Australian federal election. Despite garnering more than 33% of the vote and providing a favourable swing of more than 5% for the ALP, Cannane lost to Liberal Party stalwart Michael MacKellar who had held the seat since 1969. Despite beating Cannane, Mackellar resigned from parliament the following year. This triggered the 1994 Warringah by-election where Labor didn't field a candidate, which was won by Tony Abbott. In 2008 Cannane said although running as a candidate in 1993 was fun at the time, he actually didn't hold any serious political aspirations and had long since moved on.

== Media career ==
Cannane's first radio job was answering the phones during ABC Local Radio's Nightlife program, hosted by Tony Delroy. It was there he was approached by the ABC to work at their youth network Triple J after writing a newspaper article where he opined the organisation wasn't providing sufficient on-air opportunities for young people.

He subsequently started work as a reporter for radio station Triple J's current affairs program, The Morning Show. In 2003, after Francis Leach left the station, Cannane took on the position of host of the show. As a journalist, Cannane has an interest in exposing unscrupulous behaviour, having reported on child abuse within the Church of Scientology, the harassment of the parents of a deceased child by the anti-vaccination lobby and the failure of the Therapeutic Goods Administration (TGA) to protect consumers from dodgy products.

He temporarily presented breakfast on ABC Radio National while the regular presenter pursued other projects.

Cannane was the founding presenter of Triple J's current affairs program, Hack, beginning in 2004.

In 2005, Cannane was accused of antisemitism by Liberal Party senator Santo Santoro who alleged at a senate committee hearing that Cannane had made reference to "those awful jews" in a November 2004 Hack interview about Mordechai Vanunu. However, Santoro later apologised and said that he had been misinformed after a review of the transcript confirmed Cannane had put no such questions forward.

In 2006 he won the Walkley Award for Broadcast Interviewing for a series of three interviews - Petrol Sniffing, Pilltesting and The Cost of War. He was also commended in the same category of the Walkleys in 2005.

In 2006 Cannane won the Excellence in Alcohol and Drug Media Reporting Award at the National Drug and Alcohol Awards and visited the US as the Australian representative on the US Department of State's Edward R Murrow program for journalists.

In 2008, Cannane presented The Hack Half Hour on ABC2.

In 2009, he fronted the ABC1 documentary series Whatever! The Science of Teenagers and published a book, First Tests: Great Australian Cricketers and the Backyards That Made Them.

In July 2010, Cannane was appointed presenter of ABC News 24's The Drum, a panel discussion program providing news and analysis on issues of the day.

Also in July 2010, Cannane broke the story of harassment of the parents of a child who died of whooping cough by the anti-vaccination lobby, the Australian Vaccination Network (AVN) on Lateline. His story was the first to expose the lobby group as callous and cruel, with revelations that their President Meryl Dorey, had sought to access medical records of the child as evidence she had died from a pertussis infection. The story also described a complaint about the AVN which was under investigation by the NSW Health Care Complaints Commission (HCCC), alleging the group disseminated misleading and dangerous health information regarding vaccination. The complaint was eventually upheld, resulting in revocation of the group's charity licence and the issuing of a public warning by the HCCC. Both these actions were overturned following a successful Supreme Court challenge by the AVN in 2011.

Cannane has continued to follow the AVN, most recently on The Drum, discussing the appearance of Dorey at the Woodford Folk Festival.

In November 2010 he was recognised for "...his honest and diligent approach to journalism and the pursuit of truth in all of its aspects and wherever it may lead" at the Australian Skeptics National Convention where he was also a speaker.

He has worked as a reporter and fill in presenter on ABC1's late night news and current affairs program, Lateline, presenter of The Drum on ABC News 24 and has appeared on Ten's The 7pm Project.

From April 2016 until July 2018, Cannane was ABC's Europe Correspondent, based in London before joining the ABC's Investigations Unit as a reporter.

In May 2021, Cannane was named as the new chief of the ABC's Europe bureau.

=== Defamation case ===
In September 2016, Cannane published Fair Game: The Incredible Untold Story of Scientology in Australia, which prompted a defamation suit to be brought against Cannane and HarperCollins by doctors John Gill and John Herron who were involved in the Australian Chelmsford deep sleep scandal.

In his book, Cannane referenced the Chelmsford Royal Commission which exposed practices which took place at the Chelmsford Private Hospital. In 2018, HarperCollins unsuccessfully applied to have the case thrown out due to the unreasonable expectation of Cannane being required to prove the findings of the royal commission.

After an eight-week trial which was held entirely on Microsoft Teams due to the COVID-19 pandemic, the lawsuit was dismissed in late 2020 with Justice Jayne Jagot ruling in favour of Cannane and HarperCollins with Gill and Herron ordered to pay costs.

According to Jagot, as a medical practitioner Herron "had no residual reputation to be protected" while she said Gill was "held in very low estimation by the relevant sector" prior to the release of Cannane's book. Jagot also accused Herron and Gill of attempting to "rewrite history". The judgement also stated that Cannane had established a defence of qualified privilege.

Gill and Herron appealed the decision to the full Federal Court in August 2021 because they believed the use 26 year old reports prepared by dead expert witnesses from a Royal Commission doesn't contribute to a fair trial upon their behalf. Additionally Gill and Herron's appeal also relied upon the idea that Cannane and HarperCollins should not have been granted qualified privilege as a defence against defamation. In 2022, the Federal Court heard the appeal and unanimously agreed that, contrary to Justice Jagot's original findings, Cannane's defence of qualified privilege was not justified and therefore would not be available to him and HarperCollins as a defence against defamation. The Federal Court of appeal, consisting of justices Steven Rares, Michael Lee and Micheal Wigney, agreed unanimously that fundamental errors were made in the original trial by Jagot and that this would in turn justify a retrial. The Federal Court's main contention with Jagot's original findings was that they primarily relied upon multiple Royal Commission expert reports prepared by doctors who are now deceased. All three judges took issue with the fact that the expert witnesses who authored the reports used in the Royal Commission and then later in Cannane's defamation trial were not available for cross examination. Additionally the expert witness who authored the reports did not state with clarity or even at all, the facts and assumptions on which their decisions were based. Furthermore, they failed to elaborate upon the process of reasoning they used when writing said reports. The appeal additionally dismissed Jagot's ruling that Cannane's writings would fall under qualified privilege as a defence against defamation. Cannane was of the belief that he would not be able to obtain an accurate account of events from Mr John Herron and or Dr John Gill, however all three justices agreed that this didn't make it reasonable upon Cannane's and HarperCollins' behalf to completely disregard their account of what occurred. The Federal Court stated that Mr Cannane had made a deliberate choice not to obtain and include an account told from Dr Gill and Mr Herron's view.

Following the Federal Court ruling, Cannane and HarperCollins appealed to the High Court of Australia in an attempt to get the Federal Court's findings overturned. The case for appeal was heard by the High Court of Australia on 17 February 2023. The High Court denied Cannane and HarperCollins' application for an appeal of the Federal Court's findings. Therefore, in the upcoming retrial Cannane and HarperCollins are unable to use qualified privilege and the Royal Commission reports to defend themselves against the claim of defamation against Dr Gill and Mr Herron.
