= Scientology and psychiatry =

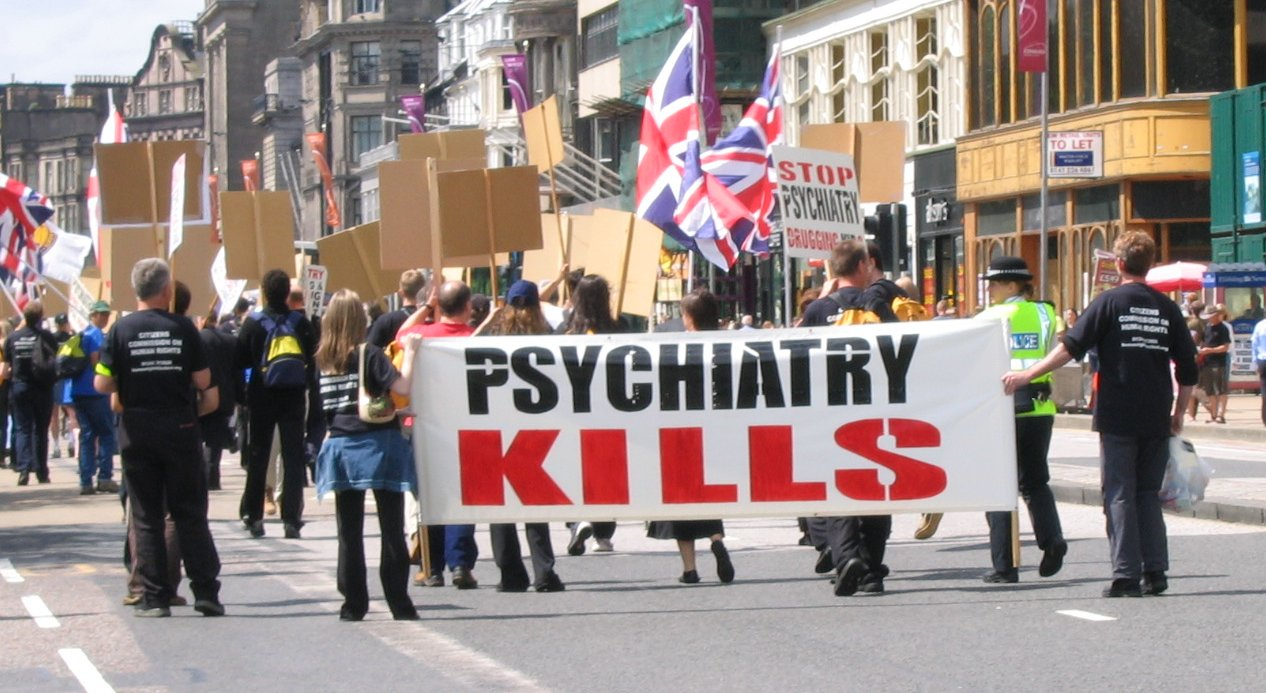
- An anti-psychiatry demonstration by Scientologists in 2005
- Type: Relationship between Scientology and psychiatry
- Description: Scientology's longstanding opposition to psychiatry, rooted in L. Ron Hubbard's writings and personal experiences
- Origins: Hubbard's early encounters with psychiatric institutions and his development of Dianetics
- Key positions: Psychiatry viewed as harmful, abusive, and incompatible with Scientology practices
- Organizations: Citizens Commission on Human Rights and related advocacy groups
- Associated controversies: Public campaigns, medical misinformation, high-profile incidents, legal disputes

Since the founding of the Church of Scientology in 1954 by L. Ron Hubbard, the relationship between Scientology and psychiatry has been dominated by strong opposition by the organization against the medical specialty of psychiatry and of psychology, with themes relating to this opposition occurring repeatedly throughout Scientology literature and doctrine. According to the Church of Scientology, psychiatry has a long history of improper and abusive care. The group's views have been disputed, criticized, and condemned by experts in the medical and scientific community and have been a source of public controversy.

L. Ron Hubbard had a complex and changing relationship with psychiatry. He recalled positive experiences with psychiatrists in his youth and requested psychiatric treatment in adulthood. By 1948, Hubbard claimed to volunteer in a psychiatric clinic and two years later published Dianetics: The Modern Science of Mental Health. In 1951, however, Hubbard's wife Sara Northrup Hollister reportedly consulted psychiatrists who recommended Hubbard be institutionalized; thereafter, Hubbard was increasingly hostile towards psychiatry.

Scientology's opposition to psychiatry has created public controversy. Critics have argued that the Church's views have discouraged the use of conventional mental-health treatment, resulting in several deaths and violent crimes involving Scientologists and the denial of psychiatric care.

== Scientology's position on psychiatry ==
In Scientology doctrine, mental and emotional difficulties are considered to be spiritual rather than medical. The Church of Scientology opposes psychiatric treatments such as electroshock, psychosurgery, and psychiatric medication, arguing that they are harmful and unsupported by science. Scientology instead promotes auditing as the only technique that properly addresses spiritual and mental distress. The Church has campaigned against psychiatry through organizations such as the Citizens Commission on Human Rights (CCHR), and Scientology members are required to sign waivers agreeing with the Church to prefer Scientology techniques rather than psychiatric treatment. Critics, including psychiatric organizations and mental-health professionals, dispute Scientology's claims and have argued that its opposition to psychiatric care can discourage members from seeking treatment.

Scientology's views are expressed by its president in the following quote:

What the Church opposes are brutal, inhumane psychiatric treatments. It does so for three principal reasons: 1) procedures such as electro-shock, drugs and lobotomy injure, maim and destroy people in the guise of help; 2) psychiatry is not a science and has no proven methods to justify the billions of dollars of government funds that are poured into it; and 3) psychiatric theories that man is a mere animal have been used to rationalize, for example, the wholesale slaughter of human beings in World Wars I and II. —Scientology.org FAQ

An October 2006 article in the Evening Standard underlines the strong opposition of Scientology toward the psychiatric profession:

Up front, David Miscavige is dramatically — and somewhat bizarrely — attacking psychiatrists, his words backed by clips from a Scientology-produced DVD are broadcast on four giant high-definition TV screens and sensationally called: Psychiatry: an industry of death [...]. 'A woman is safer in a park at midnight than on a psychiatrist's couch', booms Miscavige, backed by savage graphics of psychiatrists — or 'psychs' as he calls them — being machine-gunned out of existence.

=== Mandatory legal waivers ===
Following legal actions involving the Church of Scientology's relationship with its members, it has become standard practice within the group for members to sign lengthy legal contracts and waivers before engaging in Scientology services. In 2003, a series of media reports examined the legal contracts required by Scientology, which require that, among other things, Scientology followers deny any and all psychiatric care that their doctors may prescribe to them:

I do not believe in or subscribe to psychiatric labels for individuals. It is my strongly held religious belief that all mental problems are spiritual in nature and that there is no such thing as a mentally incompetent person — only those suffering from spiritual upset of one kind or another dramatized by an individual. I reject all psychiatric labels and intend for this Contract to clearly memorialize my desire to be helped exclusively through religious, spiritual means and not through any form of psychiatric treatment, specifically including involuntary commitment based on so-called lack of competence. Under no circumstances, at any time, do I wish to be denied my right to care from members of my religion to the exclusion of psychiatric care or psychiatric directed care, regardless of what any psychiatrist, medical person, designated member of the state or family member may assert supposedly on my behalf.

== Campaigns and organizations ==
A 1969 book, Believe What You Like, described an attempt by Scientologists to secretly infiltrate the National Association of Mental Health in Britain and turn official policy against mental health treatment. Though they were expelled from the organization after their identity and mission were revealed, the Church of Scientology then filed a number of suits against the NAMH.

When Operation Snow White, a Church of Scientology campaign to purge unfavorable records about Scientology and its founder L. Ron Hubbard, was revealed in 1980, it came to light that Scientology agents of the Guardian's Office had also conducted a similar campaign against the World Federation for Mental Health and the National Association of Mental Health.

=== Citizens Commission on Human Rights ===
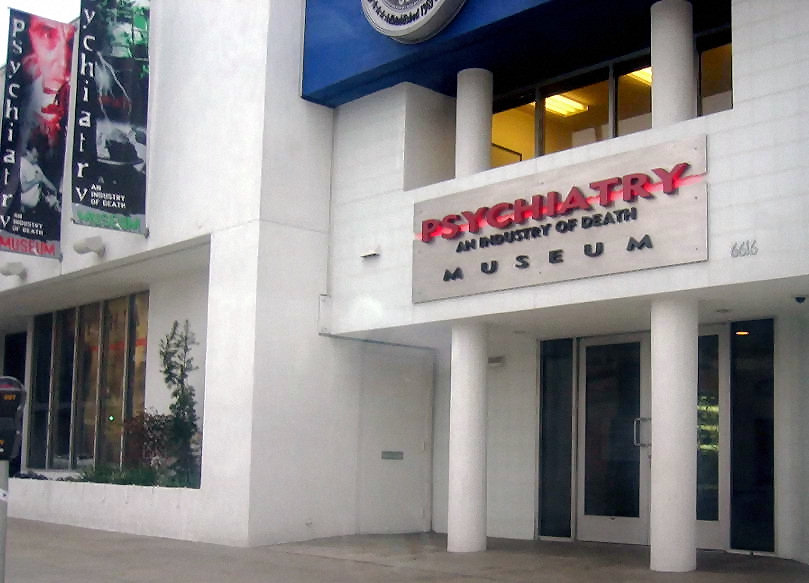
CCHR's museum, Psychiatry: An Industry of Death

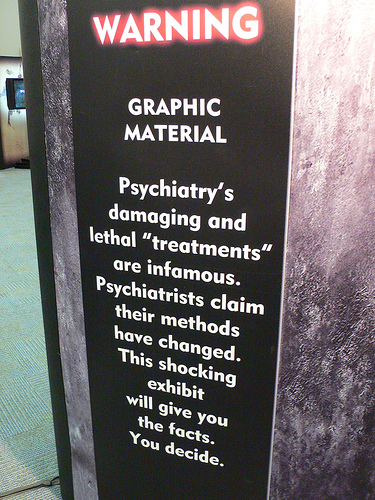
Warning sign at the museum

The Citizens Commission on Human Rights (CCHR), an institution set up by Scientology and Thomas Szasz, also claims that the real nature of psychiatry is that of human rights abuse.

In 1966, Hubbard declared all-out war on psychiatry, telling Scientologists that "We want at least one bad mark on every psychiatrist in England, a murder, an assault, or a rape or more than one." He committed the Church of Scientology to the goal of eradicating psychiatry in 1969, announcing that "Our war has been forced to become 'To take over absolutely the field of mental healing on this planet in all forms.'"

Not coincidentally, the Church of Scientology founded the Citizens Commission on Human Rights that same year as its primary vehicle for attacking psychiatry. CCHR still quotes Hubbard's above-cited statement that all psychiatrists are criminals: "There is not one institutional psychiatrist alive who, by ordinary criminal law, could not be arraigned and convicted of extortion, mayhem and murder. Our files are full of evidence on them."

CCHR has conducted campaigns against Prozac, against electroconvulsive therapy, against Ritalin (and the existence of ADHD) and against various health legislations. CCHR opened an exhibit in their building: Psychiatry: An Industry of Death.

==== Anti-psychiatry books by Scientologists ====
Bruce Wiseman from CCHR published the book Psychiatry: The Ultimate Betrayal (Scientology's Freedom Publications, 1995), in which he portrays psychiatry as creating Adolf Hitler.

The German Scientologists Thomas Roder and Volker Kubillus wrote the book Psychiatrists: the Men Behind Hitler (also published by Scientology's Freedom Publications, 1995–2001), that advances a conspiracy theory of all-powerful psychiatrists to overwhelm the world.

== Public advocacy and media ==
=== Tom Cruise ===
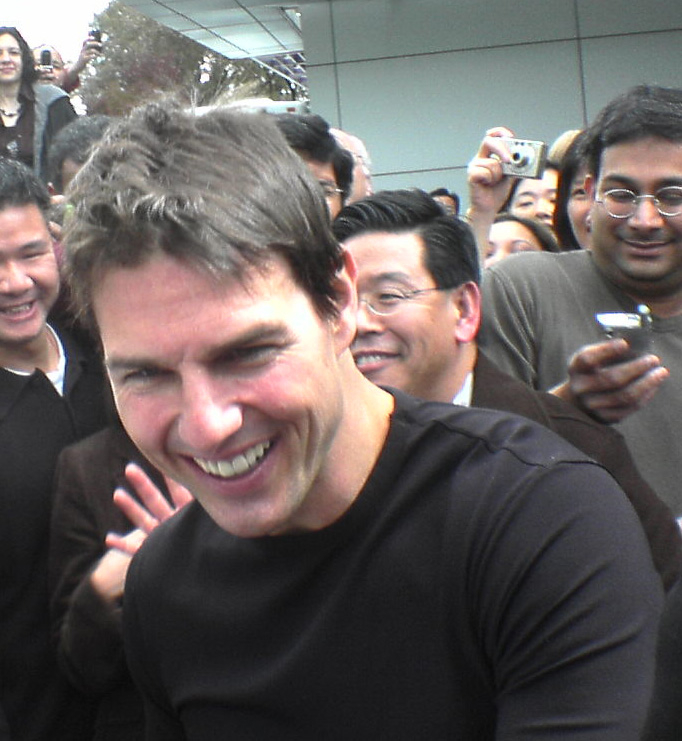
Actor Tom Cruise, a vocal critic of psychiatry

In 2005, celebrity Scientologist Tom Cruise strongly asserted his public opposition to psychiatry.

Tom Cruise has been highly vocal in attacking the use of psychiatric medication, gaining particular attention for becoming extremely animated on the subject during an interview on Today on June 25, 2005. His position has attracted considerable criticism from psychiatrists and other physicians (American Psychiatric Association and National Mental Health Association), and individuals suffering from depression.

In January 2004, Cruise made the controversial statement "I think psychiatry should be outlawed." Further controversy erupted in 2005 after he openly criticized actress Brooke Shields for using the drug Paxil (paroxetine), an anti-depressant to which Shields attributes her recovery from postpartum depression after the birth of her first daughter in 2003. Cruise asserted that there is no such thing as a chemical imbalance and that psychiatry is a form of pseudoscience. Shields responded that Cruise "should stick to saving the world from aliens and let women who are experiencing postpartum depression decide what treatment options are best for them". This led to a heated argument between Matt Lauer and Cruise on NBC's Today on June 24, 2005.

Medical authorities view Cruise's comments as furthering the social stigma of mental illness. Shields herself called Cruise's comments "a disservice to mothers everywhere". In late August 2006, Cruise apologized in person to Shields for his comments.

Scientology is well known for its opposition to mainstream psychiatry and the psychoactive drugs which are routinely prescribed for treatment. It was reported that Cruise's anti-psychiatry actions led to a rift with director Steven Spielberg. Spielberg had reportedly mentioned in Cruise's presence the name of a doctor friend who prescribed psychiatric medication. Shortly thereafter, the doctor's office was picketed by Scientologists, reportedly angering Spielberg.

== Public controversies and incidents ==
=== Introspection Rundown and the death of Lisa McPherson ===
The Introspection Rundown, which Hubbard invented in 1973 as a Scientology treatment for psychotic breaks, calls for isolating the person under silent watch and supplying vitamins and minerals before auditing begins; Hubbard announced that it meant "the last reason to have psychiatry around is gone."

In June 1995, Lisa McPherson had gone through the rundown when she was experiencing severe stress in her work and life, was feeling despondent, and wanted to leave Scientology. A few months later, she attested to the State of Clear and became a walking advertisement for Scientology. However, in November she started to unravel again. During a minor car accident, she removed her clothes in the street and told paramedics she needed help.

She was taken to nearby Morton Plant Hospital, where the emergency physician sought a psychiatric evaluation. Several Scientology officials arrived, told staff that psychiatry was against their religion, and convinced McPherson to come with them. A psychiatric nurse found that McPherson did not meet the criteria for Florida's involuntary commitment law, and McPherson left against medical advice, accompanied by the six Scientologists.

McPherson was taken to the Church's Fort Harrison Hotel for a second Introspection Rundown and was isolated. According to Marty Rathbun, the Church failed to follow their own procedures of the Introspection Rundown which resulted in McPherson becoming increasingly agitated, falling into a coma, and dying after just 17 days in Church custody. On December 5, Church staff drove her to a hospital 45 minutes away where Scientologist physician David Minkoff worked, passing several closer hospitals because they feared that doctors there would involve psychiatrists. She was emaciated, dirty, covered in bruises and scrapes, and was pronounced dead on arrival. The following day the local police department started a suspicious death investigation.

In 1998, prosecutors charged the Church with the felonies of criminal neglect, abuse or neglect of a disabled adult, and practicing medicine without a license. The Church "closed ranks", destroyed evidence, lied to law enforcement, the prosecutors, and the media. It argued that prosecuting it would unconstitutionally punish Scientologists for their religious opposition to psychiatric care. The charges were dropped in 2000 after the medical examiner revised the cause of death. In 2001, Dr. Minkoff, who had prescribed drugs during McPherson's isolation without seeing her, was suspended and fined. A wrongful death suit brought by her family against the Church and its leader David Miscavige was settled in 2004.

=== Jeremy Perkins ===
On March 13, 2003, Scientologist Jeremy Perkins killed his mother, Elli, by stabbing her 77 times. Perkins, previously diagnosed with schizophrenia, never received treatment after previous incidents with violence and hallucinations. His mother, active in the Buffalo Church of Scientology, felt that vitamins and Scientology routines were better than psychological counseling and anti-psychotic medication.

=== Linda Waliki ===
On July 5 2007, 25-year-old Australian woman Linda Waliki killed her 52-year-old father Michael, her 15-year-old sister Kathryn, and injured her mother Sue with a knife. Her name was released in the print edition of the Sydney Morning Herald on 7 July 2007. It was previously unreleased due to one of the victims being under age. She was diagnosed with a psychiatric illness, but her parents denied her continued psychiatric treatment due to their Scientology beliefs. Instead they replaced this medication with one specially imported from Scientologists in the United States.

=== Kenneth Thompson ===
During his 2019 double murder trial, Scientologist Kenneth Thompson's attorneys, aiming for a manslaughter verdict rather than first-degree murder, argued as part of his defense that his actions were rational if viewed through the lens of Scientology. Thompson killed his sister-in-law and her boyfriend after learning that their son was receiving mental health-related treatment. The defense claimed that to a Scientologist like Thompson, who was raised in the Church from the age of five, the treatment posed an irreparable harm to the child as one of the main tenets of Scientology is that psychology is evil. Thompson was convicted of first-degree murder and sentenced to death. He was killed in prison in 2022 in a suspected homicide.

== Responses and analysis ==
The Church of Scientology says that they are near victory in their war against psychiatry. In their treatise Those Who Oppose Scientology, it is stated:

Today, there are 500 Dianeticists and Scientologists to every psychiatrist [...] while Scientology is more visible than ever, with churches dotting every continent on Earth and millions of parishioners around the world, one is hard pressed to find even a single psychiatrist with a shingle on his door.

Scientology claims a worldwide membership of more than 8 million, the total of people who have taken the Scientology introductory course. The Church of Scientology claims 3.5 million members in the United States, though an independent survey has found the number of people in the United States would state their religion as 'Scientology' is close to 55,000. By comparison, the American Psychiatric Association and the American Psychological Association, which are composed of psychiatrists and psychologists, have 38,000 and 148,000 members respectively.

=== Psychiatric responses ===
Mental health professionals are not concerned that the public will take Citizens Commission on Human Rights (CCHR) materials seriously, because of the organization's connection with the Church of Scientology; however, they argue that these materials can have a harmful impact when quoted without attribution.

Except for court trials and media publications and public rallies, published materials have received little notice outside of Scientology and CCHR; of reviews available, few are favorable. Psychology professor Benjamin Beit-Hallahmi's short review of Psychiatrists: The Men Behind Hitler states:

Scientology has attracted much attention through its propaganda effort against what it calls psychiatry. This has involved great expense and organizational effort, carried out through a variety of fronts. If the book Psychiatrists: The Men Behind Hitler (Roder, Kubillus, & Burwell, 1995) is a representative example, and I believe it is, it proves decisively that the campaign is rooted in total paranoia and pathetic ignorance. Reading this book, and I will urge you not to waste too much time doing it, makes clear that the authors simply have no idea what psychiatry is.

The American Psychiatric Association's Lynn Schultz-Writsel adds:

We have not responded in any way, shape or form. There has not been a hue and cry from members to respond. And anyway, the publication speaks for itself.

Michael Burke, the president of the Kansas Psychiatric Association, said regarding Scientology, "They aren't really able to support their position with any scientific data, which they tend to ignore. ... the public seems to be able to look right past the Scientology hoopla."

=== Academic analysis ===
The commercial motivation of Scientology in questioning psychiatry, with their alternative practice, dianetics, has been questioned by Peter W. Huber.

According to Susan Raine in Scientology in Popular Culture (2017), The Church of Scientology's programs against psychiatry "complicates the movement's quest for religious legitimacy." This is because of "the way in which Hubbard tried to replace psychiatry, psychology and other forms of counseling and therapy with Scientology."

In a 2017 article in The Humanistic Psychologist, John H. Wolfe notes that Scientology has been widely discredited, and describes the ways in which Scientology differs from mainstream psychotherapy. He mentions that Scientology counseling is systematically thorough, meaning it considers a client's problem individually and thoroughly before moving on to the next one. Wolfe also compares Scientology auditing to the "nondirective therapy" of Carl Rogers, "who stressed the importance of having the client find the client's own answers, while the counselor refrains from interpretation, but listens with empathic understanding." Unlike Roger's technique, Scientology's auditors ask leading questions, instead of letting them independently stumble upon answers on their own.

=== Relations with anti-psychiatry movement ===
The Citizens Commission on Human Rights was co-founded by anti-psychiatrist Thomas Szasz and the Church of Scientology in 1969. Some anti-psychiatry websites and psychiatric survivors groups have sought to distance themselves from Scientology and the CCHR. In particular, the organisation Mind Freedom has specifically made public statements to emphasise that it is not connected with either CCHR or the Church of Scientology.

Despite sharing notable anti-psychiatry views on some issues with the secular critics, Scientology doctrine does differ in some respects. Scientology has promoted psychiatry-related conspiracy theories, including that psychiatrists were behind the Yugoslav Wars and that September 11 was caused by psychiatrists. Scientologists are committed never to take psychiatric drugs and to reject psychology outright.

The socio-political roots of the movements have different origins. Advocates of the anti-psychiatric world view such as David Cooper, R. D. Laing and Michel Foucault had ties with the political left of the 1960s; Thomas Szasz, with the civil libertarians of the right, as well as an outspoken atheist. Many advocates of the anti-psychiatry movement have stated that they consider the idea of "mental illness" as a convenient and inaccurate label assigned by society rather than an objective biomedical state, rejecting psychiatric terms such as schizophrenia which they may see as stigmatizing. By contrast, Hubbard referred to "schizophrenics" in his writings on Scientology theory, and developed the emotional tone scale to, in part, gauge the health of a person's mental state. Furthermore, in his Science of Survival Hubbard suggested putting people very low on the scale into quarantine, a practice at odds with, for instance, the aim of the American Association for the Abolition of Involuntary Mental Hospitalization: an organization co-founded by Szasz to end involuntary commitment.

== Historical origins: L. Ron Hubbard and psychiatry ==
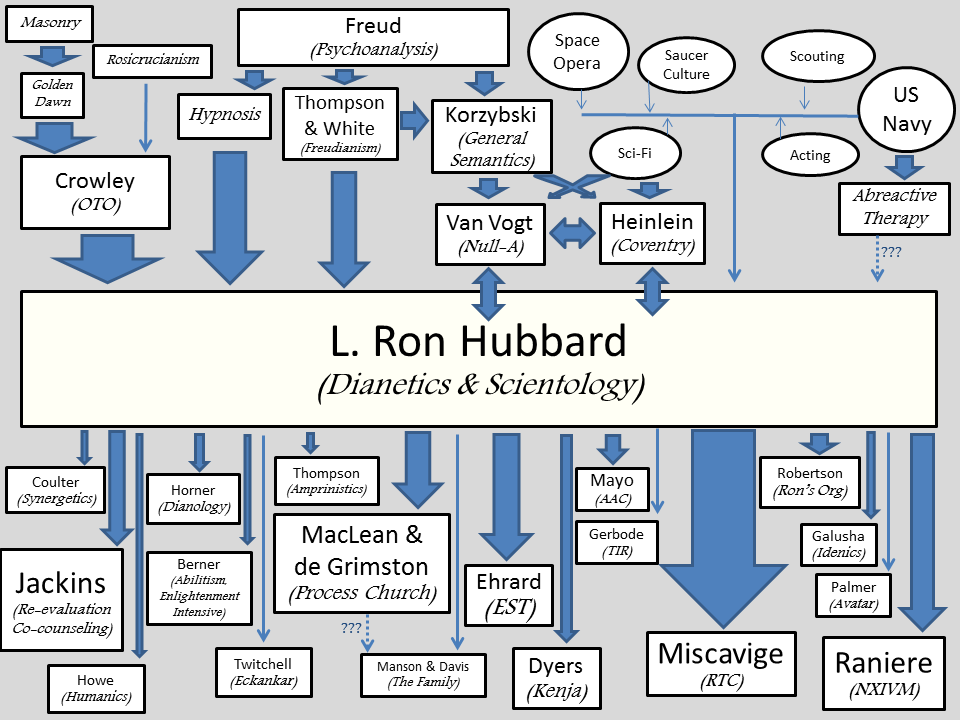
Hubbard's beliefs and practices, drawn from a diverse set of sources, influenced numerous offshoots, splinter-groups, and new movements.

L. Ron Hubbard was an American author of science fiction and fantasy stories. Hubbard reported many encounters with psychiatrists from the age of 12 onward.

During World War II, Hubbard was hospitalized; in 1947, Hubbard requested psychiatric treatment and the following year moved with his wife to Savannah, Georgia, where he was reportedly associated with a psychiatric clinic.

In 1950, Hubbard published Dianetics: The Modern Science of Mental Health.

In 1951, it was publicly reported that Hubbard's wife Sara had been advised by a psychiatrist that Hubbard should be institutionalized for treatment of paranoid schizophrenia. They divorced, and the following year, Hubbard founded Scientology, an anti-psychiatry religious movement.

=== Overview ===
Hubbard's views on psychiatry evolved over time.

Hubbard spoke positively of his childhood and teen encounters with psychiatrists in the 1920s and 30s. At the age of 12, Hubbard was accompanied by Navy psychiatrist Joseph Thompson on an ocean trip from Seattle to Washington, D.C. Hubbard likewise wrote positively of teenage/young-adult encounters with D.C.-based psychiatrist William Alanson White. Some of Hubbard's later works included acknowledgements of both Thompson and White, and Hubbard would later claim to have received clinical training from both Thompson and White.

In contrast, Hubbard spoke more critically of his later encounters with psychiatrists and psychiatric institutions. Although Hubbard had written positively of psychiatric hospital superintendent William Alanson White, White's successor (Winfred Overholser) was singled out for criticism. Hubbard likewise spoke critically of his encounters with a Washington, D.C., institution for the treatment of schizophrenia called "Walnut Lodge" (presumably Chestnut Lodge).

During the Second World War, Hubbard was hospitalized at Oak Knoll Military Hospital. In 1947, Hubbard wrote a letter to the VA requesting psychiatric treatment. The following year, Hubbard and his wife Sara moved to Savannah, Georgia, where Hubbard would later recall having been associated with a charity mental health clinic.

According to Hubbard, he worked as a volunteer helping to treat charity patients during his time in Savannah. While in Savannah, Hubbard began working on a "book of psychology" about "the cause and cure of nervous tension"; the next year, he published Dianetics: The Modern Science of Mental Health.

In 1951, Hubbard's wife Sara reportedly consulted a psychiatrist who recommended Hubbard be institutionalized. Hubbard initially responded by kidnapping Sara. Thereafter, he took their daughter and fled to Havana. After Sara went public with her story, Hubbard returned her daughter. In his final known encounter with a psychiatrist, Hubbard consulted a practitioner in order to rebut public claims of his own mental illness.

Thereafter, Hubbard was increasingly hostile towards psychiatry. In the 50s, Hubbard sought to identify "Subversive" psychiatrists or other "Potential Subversives". By the early 70s, Hubbard wrote of having redefined the word "psychiatrist" to mean "an antisocial enemy of the people".

=== Hubbard's early encounters with psychiatry ===
Joseph Thompson, 1917

Hubbard claimed to have personal encounters with several named psychiatrists, beginning in his childhood. Some, like Thompson and White, would later be remembered favorably—Hubbard explicitly cited both as sources for his work, and he and the Church of Scientology have used these hagiographic stories to "authenticate" Hubbard's background in mental health techniques. Others, such as Overholser and Center, were the subject of scorn.

==== Joseph Cheesman Thompson ====
In 1923, L. Ron Hubbard met fellow passenger Joseph "Snake" Thompson, a Navy medical officer and psychoanalyst, on a voyage from Seattle to Washington D.C. via the Panama Canal. In 1958 Hubbard recounted meeting Thompson, "I traveled with Commander Thompson from Seattle, Washington through the Panama Canal to Washington, D.C., when I was about twelve and knew him during all that time that I was in Washington and later." Hubbard recalled that "[Thompson's] friends called him 'Snake' and his enemies called him 'Crazy'. He had lots of both." Hubbard shared anecdotes from his life, and considered Thompson to be a "very great man" who sparked Hubbard's interest in the human mind. Hubbard said that Thompson told him, "If it's not true for you, it's not true." Hubbard recalled that "I was just a kid and Commander Thompson didn't have any boy of his own, and he and I just got along fine." Hubbard continued "Why he [Thompson] took it into his head to start beating Freud into my head, I don't know. But he did."

In 1953, Hubbard argued "It's very odd to realize, as I did one day, that in subsequent years I have approximated to a very remarkable degree the career of Commander Thompson – to show you what an impressed – impressionable boy can have handed to him suddenly."

In 1954, Hubbard described an encounter with psychiatrists in which playing sports was seen as a positive indicator:

"I knew people, and the people who were trained by these people. And, if there was anything they were in awe of, it was somebody who engaged in sports. So this fellow was phenomenal to them. They knew this was very good somehow or another, but they couldn't quite put their finger on it. And to this day it is enough to tell a psychiatrist that, and prove to him, that you are very energetic and engaged in sports, to have him dismiss you immediately as being completely sane. Only that's just, bing. He just says, "Well, I..." He just goes into apathy right at that point. That's the truth.
"The... it was an interesting thing, for instance, to William Allen White. And Commander Thompson. Both of them, where I was concerned, that I wasn't very interested in sitting around figuring about this stuff and didn't seem to be terribly interested in the insane."

Hubbard described later encounters with Thompson: "In 1930 I knew a fellow by the name of Commander Thompson. I had known him before, actually".

In 1958, Hubbard told an audience: "I have made people feel better by using straight Freudian analysis the way I got it from Commander Thompson who imported it to the US Navy, not via Catherine [sic] Horney".

Thompson died in 1943, seven years before the publication of Dianetics. Thompson was included in the Acknowledgements section of 1951's Science of Survival, as was William A. White.

==== William Alanson White ====
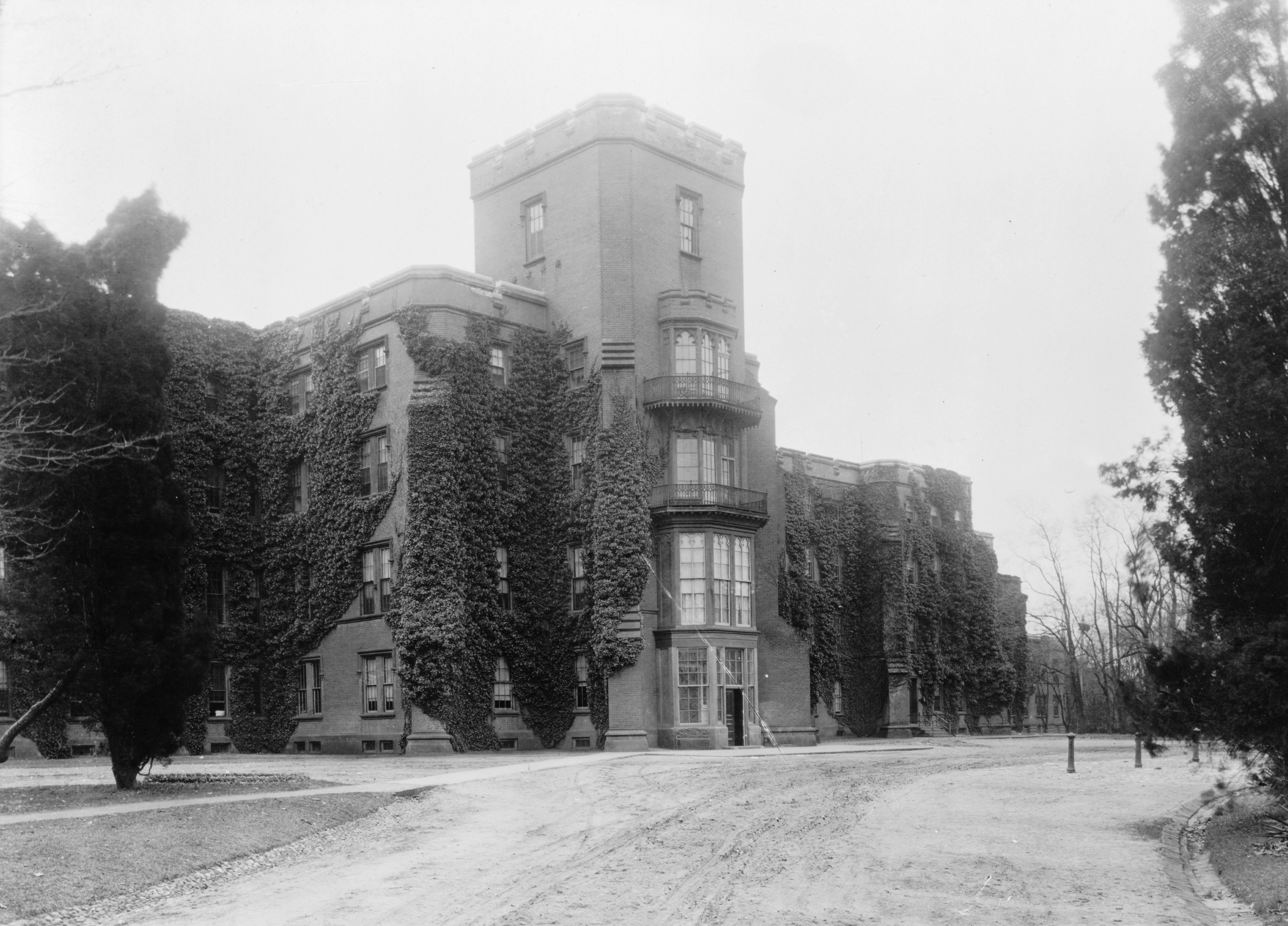
The Center Building at St. Elizabeths, one of the oldest on the campus, as it appeared in the early 20th century

William Alanson White was an American neurologist and psychiatrist who served as superintendent of St. Elizabeths Hospital. A letter from the Hubbard Association of Scientologists International to the FBI, dated June 12, 1954, claims that Hubbard was trained by both Joseph Thompson and William Alanson White. Hubbard recalled "Dr. William Alanson White, a very fine man. He was head of the big St. Elizabeth's, the big mental institution there in Washington, D.C., and he had been a friend of mine for quite a while. I had met him through other friends of Dr. Thompson's". In a lecture, Hubbard described consulting White about a theoretical calculation of human memory capacity, apparently during Hubbard's university days. Hubbard recalled that "he [White] used to see me every once in a while".

In a 1951 lecture, Hubbard described St. Elizabeth's as "where they sent the naval officers after they had received their fifth contradiction from the Navy Department".

For two years in the 1920s, White had opened the doors of St. Elizabeths to Alfred Korzybski, enabling Korzybski to directly study mental illness, research that contributed heavily to Korzybski's 1933 Science and Sanity: An Introduction to Non-Aristotelian Systems and General Semantics. Hubbard cited the relationship between Korzybski and White in his lectures.

White died in 1937, thirteen years before the publication of Dianetics. White was included in the Acknowledgements section of 1951's Science of Survival, as was Joseph Thompson.

==== "Walnut Lodge" ====
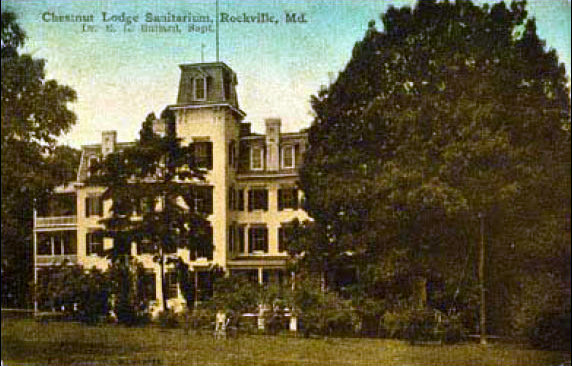
Hand coloured photographic postcard of Chestnut Lodge Sanitorium postmarked 1909

For much of the 1920s and 30s, L. Ron Hubbard lived in Washington D.C. (Note: 1922–1927, 1929–1932) In 1932, Hubbard listed the US Naval Hospital in Washington as his address; In 1933, Hubbard listed a P.O. Box in Beallsville, Maryland.

In a 1952 lecture, Hubbard recalls his interaction with staff and patients at a facility specializing in schizophrenia which he calls "Walnut Lodge" (presumably Chestnut Lodge):

there's a place by the name of Walnut Lodge. I... I... They don't see anything humorous in that, by the way; it's Walnut Lodge. [...] They... they... they sent three people to see, to... to see me and every one of them was under treatment. And this was their staff. But anyway, very good people there, I'm sure, didn't happen to meet any. Have some fine patients though. Anyway, they... they treat only schizophrenia. And so they take only schizophrenics. Now how do they get only schizophrenics? Well, anybody sent to Walnut Lodge is a classified schizophrenic. And they take somebody who is a dementia praecox unclassified or a more modern definition, a mania-depressive and they take him from Saint Elizabeth's and they take him over to Walnut Lodge and he goes onto the books as a schizophrenic. Why? Because Walnut Lodge takes only schizophrenics.

In 1966, Hubbard recalled "Identification by classification. This is a type of thing Psychiatry does all the time. They say this is a Dementia Praecox case. They've gotten so idiotic with it now that if someboy goes to Chestnut Lodge... if a person is transferred to Chestnut Lodge, regardless of their symptoms before, they now have schizophrenia."

Hubbard would return to "Walnut Lodge" in future writings. A 1970 bulletin states that "$2,000 a month for board only is the price at Walnut Lodge in Washington DC, an average place." In his work Mission Earth, Hubbard writes "Arginal P. Pauper was today committed to Walnut Lodge Nut House".

=== Hubbard as patient ===
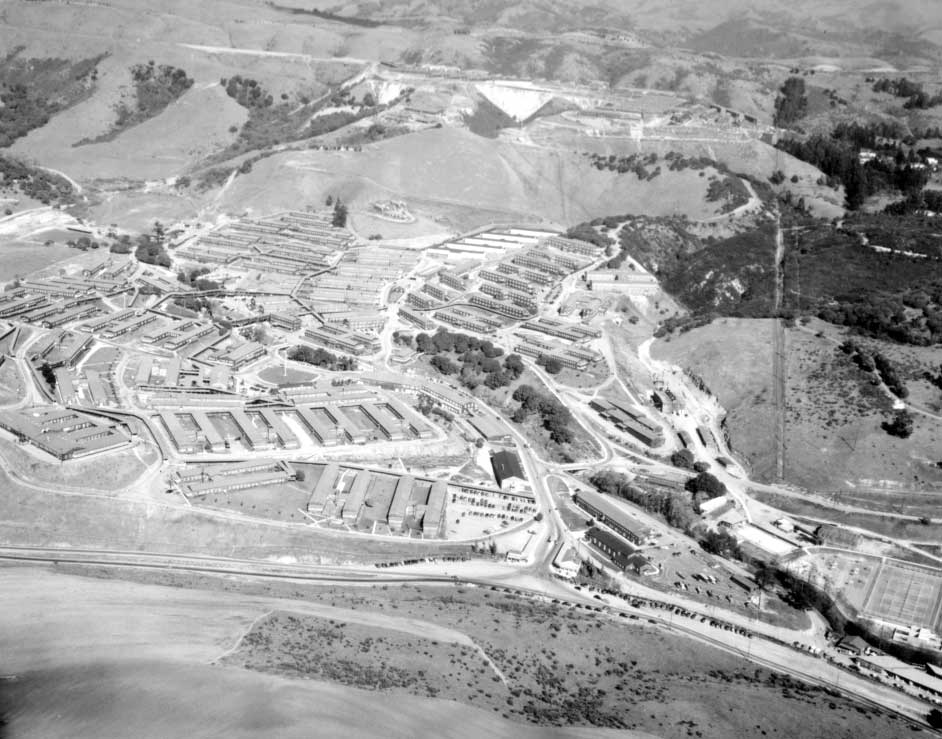
Naval Hospital, Oak Knoll, c. 1946

During World War Two, Hubbard was hospitalized at a California military hospital. After his release, he wrote to the Veterans Administration to request further treatment. Thereafter, he and his wife moved to Savannah, Georgia, where he was reportedly associated with a charity mental health clinic.

==== Oak Knoll Military Hospital ====
In 1945, Hubbard was a patient at Oak Knoll Military Hospital. Hubbard's estranged son, L. Ron Hubbard, Jr., later known as Ron DeWolf, would later state that Hubbard received psychiatric treatment during his hospitalization. Hubbard would later cite his time with psychiatric patients at Oak Knoll "using a park bench as a consulting room" as a major influence on his development of Dianetics.

==== Request for psychiatric treatment ====
After his discharge, Hubbard sought out psychiatric help to treat his "long periods of moroseness and suicidal inclinations" but reported that he could not afford it. A letter dated October 15, 1947, which Hubbard wrote to the Veterans Administration (VA) begins: "This is a request for treatment". The letter continues:

After trying and failing for two years to regain my equilibrium in civil life, I am utterly unable to approach anything like my own competence. My last physician informed me that it might be very helpful if I were to be examined and perhaps treated psychiatrically or even by a psychoanalyst. Toward the end of my service I avoided out of pride any mental examinations, hoping that time would balance a mind which I had every reason to suppose was seriously affected. I cannot account for nor rise above long periods of moroseness and suicidal inclinations, and have newly come to realize that I must first triumph above this before I can hope to rehabilitate myself at all. ... I cannot, myself, afford such treatment.
Would you please help me?

The following year, Hubbard and his wife moved to Savannah, Georgia, where he was associated with a charity psychiatric clinic.

=== Hubbard as would-be psychologist ===
After his arrival in Savannah, Hubbard began to describe himself as mental health practitioner, ultimately authoring Dianetics.

==== Savannah, Georgia psychiatric clinic ====
Beginning in June 1948, the nationally syndicated wire service United Press ran a story on an American Legion-sponsored psychiatric ward in Savannah, Georgia, which sought to keep mentally ill war veterans out of jail. That summer, Hubbard was arrested by the San Luis Obispo sheriff on a charge of petty theft for passing a fraudulent check.

In late 1948, Hubbard and his second wife Sara moved from California to Savannah, Georgia, where he would later claim to have "worked" as a "volunteer" in the psychiatric clinic, where he claimed he "processed an awful lot of Negroes". Hubbard later wrote of having observed a "Dr. Center" in Savannah:

I well recall a conversation I had with a Dr. Center in Savannah, Georgia, in 1949. It well expresses the arrogance and complete contempt for law and order of the psychiatrist. ... A man had just called to inquire after his wife who was "under treatment" in Center's hospital. Center asked him, "Do you have the money...? That's right, thirty thousand ... well you better get it or I'll have to send your dear wife to the state institution and you know what will happen then!" ... I was there doing work on charity patients the local psychiatrists wouldn't touch. Center had forgotten I was in the room.

In a 1966 interview, Hubbard recalled a man receiving a bill for psychoanalysis: "These people, you know, in psychoanalysis, they worked on somebody for a year just to find out if they could help him and then they charged him about 9,000 quid for having not helped him".

==== Dianetics ====
In January 1949, Hubbard wrote that he was working on a "book of psychology" about "the cause and cure of nervous tension", which he was going to call The Dark Sword, Excalibur or Science of the Mind. In April 1949, Hubbard wrote from Savannah to inform the Gerontological Society at Baltimore City Hospital that he was preparing a paper entitled Certain Discoveries and Researches Leading to the Removal of Early Traumatic Experiences Including Attempted Abortion, Birth Shock and Infant Illnesses and Accidents with an Examination of their Effects Physiological and Psychological and their Potential Influence on Longevity on the Adult Individual with an Account of the Techniques Evolved and Employed. The Society apparently declined involvement.

He also wrote to the American Medical Association and the American Psychiatric Association. These letters, and their responses, have not been published, though Hubbard later said that they had been negative. Hubbard later wrote, "In 1948 I wrote a thesis on an elementary technique of application and submitted it to the medical and psychiatric professions for their use or consideration. The data was not utilized."

In December 1949, Hubbard composed a letter to publisher John Campbell in which he provided an article entitled "A Criticism of Dianetics" to be published under the pen name Irving R. Kutzman, M.D. (ostensibly an opponent of Dianetic auditing). In his letter to Campbell, Hubbard described synthesizing the opinions of multiple doctors:

The philosophic derivation comments are direct quote from Davies of APA. The comment on operators is direct quote from Craig, MD PhD of Savannah. The pre-frontal lobotomy angle (changed only to trans-orbital leukotomy) is a direct quote from Delchamp, MD PhD. You heard nearly all these things repeated by Kahn, MD and he did not diverge in any particular from the standard attitude toward Dianetics, General Semantics (quote on this from Davies of APA), Cybernetics (Boswell, MD) etc. etc. This article would be found by an MD psychiatrist to be a pretty valid statement of their case because they have so stated the case many times.

The following year, Hubbard authored Dianetics: the Modern Science of Mental Health, a handbook for "the psychiatrist, psycho-analyst and intelligent layman".

By September 1950, the American Psychological Association's governing body unanimously adopted a resolution advising its members against using Hubbard's techniques with their patients and leading psychologists spoke out against Dianetics. Thereafter, Hubbard was critical of psychiatry.

Winfred Overholser was superintendent of St. Elizabeths Hospital after 1937. By 1950, he was president of the American Psychiatric Association. In a 1953 lecture, Hubbard claimed:

Doctor Upholstered is in charge of ... he's in charge of the rest home for feeble minded government officials here in Washington, Saint Elizabeths.

In 1972, Hubbard recalled:

[Overholser] blew the whistle on Dianetics when St. Elizabeths psychiatrists were just beginning to use it and were for the first time getting results on patients at the National Asylum. He forbade them to use it but they disagreed heavily and privately used it for many years under cover. This broke up introducing Dianetics on regular channels – May 1950. ... Thereafter a violent and gory attack was mounted. It was begun by Overholser, went over to [the] George Wash[ington] U[niversity] Psychology [Department] at once and there a student of the first Dianetics class (Dolly Jones) also a psychology student was hypnotized, beaten, told to go crazy, did so and we had to hospitalize her. ... He (Overholser) was a member of the Club.

In another lecture, Hubbard claimed he gave a speech in which he hypnotized the staff of St. Elizabeths.

In late 1950, Hubbard criticized mainstream psychiatry but still wrote positively of Sigmund Freud as a fellow persecuted trailblazer, arguing that "to talk of the faults of Freud, as do those who practice psychoanalysis today, is ungenerous. This great pioneer, against the violent objections of medical doctors and the psychiatrists of his day, ventured to put forth the theory that memory was connected with present time behavior" Hubbard elaborated: "Freud was so thoroughly shunned by neurologists of his day and medicine ever since, that only his great literary skill brought his work as far as it has come."

As late as 1955, Hubbard still identified himself with mental health professions, describing himself as "a writer, a scientist, and a psychologist".

=== Attempted institutionalization and aftermath ===
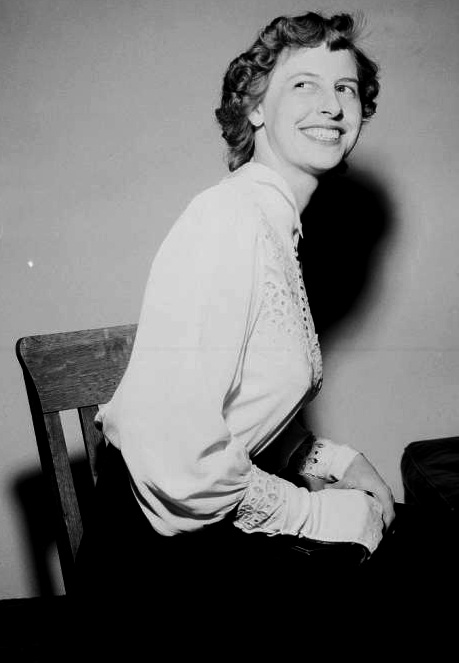
Hubbard's wife Sara in 1951

In 1951, Hubbard's wife Sara sought advice from a psychiatrist who recommend Hubbard be institutionalized. Upon learning of the plan, Hubbard initially kidnapped Sara; After her release, Hubbard fled to Havana with their young daughter. Hubbard then underwent a public divorce in which his wife publicly alleged that Hubbard had been diagnosed with paranoid schizophrenia. Upon his return to the US, Hubbard consulted with a psychiatrist to rebut public claims of his mental illness.

==== Sara consults psychiatrist ====
In 1951, Hubbard's wife Sara went to a psychiatrist to obtain advice about his increasingly violent and irrational behaviour, and was told that he probably needed to be institutionalized and that she was in serious danger. She gave Hubbard an ultimatum: get treatment or she would leave with the baby. He was furious and threatened to kill their daughter Alexis rather than let Northrup care for her. Sara later recalled: "He didn't want her to be brought up by me because I was in league with the doctors. He thought I had thrown in with the psychiatrists, with the devils."

In a letter to the Attorney General dated May 1951, Hubbard claims that on "Feb. 25 she [Sara] flew to San Francisco and my general managers Jack Maloney in New Jersey received a phone call from her and Miles Hollister and a psychiatrist named Meyer Zelig in San Francisco that I had gone insane and that they needed money to incarcerate me quickly."

Two decades later, in 1972, Hubbard would write to followers:

the NY Times Literary Section began an attack and a lot of violent track ran by which included DR. MEYER-ZELIG, a psychiatrist in San Francisco master-minding a kidnapping of me to fly me to St. Louis and be put away. His (Zelig's) plans miscarried. MILES HOLLISTER, formerly a psych student, got hold of SARA NORTHRUP (really Komknoidominoff) (or ov) and handed her over to Zelig who put her in deep hypnosis, fixated her on the idea I was trying to kill her and spun her in, in which state she has remained since. This caused the final destruction of the HDRF (Hubbard Dianetic Research Foundation) as national press only played up her divorce.

==== Hubbard kidnaps wife, daughter ====
On the night of February 24, 1951, Hubbard allegedly took daughter Alexis while Sara was at a movie theater. A few hours later, he returned with two of his Dianetics Foundation staff and told Sara, who was now back at her apartment: "We have Alexis and you'll never see her alive unless you come with us." She was bundled into the back of a car and driven to San Bernardino, California, where Hubbard attempted to find a doctor to examine his wife and declare her insane. His search was unsuccessful and he released her at Yuma Airport across the state line in Arizona. He promised that he would tell her where Alexis was if she signed a piece of paper saying that she had gone with him voluntarily. She agreed but Hubbard reneged on the deal and flew to Chicago, where he found a psychologist who wrote a favorable report about his mental condition to refute Northrup's accusations. Rather than telling Northrup where Alexis was, he called her and said that "he had cut [Alexis] into little pieces and dropped the pieces in a river and that he had seen little arms and legs floating down the river and it was my fault, I'd done it because I'd left him."

From March to May 1951, Hubbard fled to Havana with his infant daughter. According to his estranged son Ronald DeWolf, Hubbard was under psychiatric care at this time.

==== Public allegation of Hubbard having 'paranoid schizophrenia' ====
After her release, Sara filed for divorce, charging Hubbard with causing her "extreme cruelty, great mental anguish and physical suffering". Her allegations produced more lurid headlines: not only was Hubbard accused of bigamy and kidnapping, but she had been subjected to "systematic torture, including loss of sleep, beatings, and strangulations and scientific experiments". Because of his "crazy misconduct" she was in "hourly fear of both the life of herself and of her infant daughter, who she has not seen for two months".

On April 23, 1951, it was publicly reported that Sara had consulted doctors who "concluded that said Hubbard was hopelessly insane, and crazy, and that there was no hope for said Hubbard, or any reason for her to endure further; that competent medical advisers recommended that said Hubbard be committed to a private sanatorium for psychiatric observation and treatment of a mental ailment known as paranoid schizophrenia." The San Francisco Chronicle coverage used the headline "Ron Hubbard Insane, Says His Wife".

Hubbard's lover, Barbara Klowden, recorded in her journal:

He [Hubbard] talked about what he was going to do to psychiatrists.

How he brought psychotic into present time in psychiatrists office and how that psychiatrist said to him "If you think you've cured this woman you're crazy. If you claim to cure people by doing that, if you're not careful, we'll lock you up." He laughed and laughed.

Then, tearing indignantly at chicken leg, he said "They all came to me and said I was a psychotic. Hah. They called me a paranoid. Can you imagine?"

My blood ran cold as he was saying that and it was all I could do to keep from weeping. Wouldn't it tear your heart out coming from the one you love when you knew all the time was a psychotic and a paranoid?

=== Psychiatry as evil ===
In 1955, Hubbard wrote that "nearly all the backlash in society against Dianetics and Scientology has a common source — the psychiatrist-psychologist-psychoanalyst clique". In a letter addressed to the FBI dated July 11, Hubbard reports having been the victim of an "attack made by psychiatrists using evidently Communist connected personnel".

In 1956, Hubbard wrote an article entitled "A Critique of Psychoanalysis" which embodies Hubbard's harder stance. Writes Hubbard: "Now and then it becomes necessary to eradicate from a new subject things which it has inherited from an old. And only because this has become necessary am I persuaded to tread upon the toes of the 'grandfather' to Dianetics and Scientology." In the essay, Hubbard admits that from "the earliest beginnings of Dianetics it is possible to trace a considerable psychoanalytic influence." Hubbard makes a distinction between Dianetics and Scientology writing that "Scientology, unlike Dianetics, is not a psychotherapy. It is therefore from the dominance of Scientology rather than from the viewpoint of Dianetics that one can understand the failings of psychoanalysis, its dangers and the reasons why it did not produce what it should have produced."

We discover psychoanalysis to have been superseded by tyrannous sadism, practiced by unprincipled men, themselves evidently in the last stages of dementia. This, then, is the end of the trail for psychoanalysis—a world of failure and brutality. Today men who call themselves analysts are merrily sawing out patients' brains, shocking them with murderous drugs, striking them with high voltages, burying them underneath mounds of ice, placing them in restraints, "sterilizing" them sexually and generally conducting themselves much as their patients would were they given the chance. It is up to us to realize, then, that psychoanalysis in its pure practice is dead the moment the spirit of humanity in which Freud developed the work is betrayed by the handing over of a patient to the merciless misconduct which passes today for treatment.

In 1957, Hubbard founded the "National Academy of American Psychology" which sought to issue a "loyalty oath" to psychologists and psychiatrists. Those who opposed the oath were to be labelled "Subversive" psychiatrists, while those who merely refused to sign the oath would be labelled "Potentially Subversive".

In 1958, Hubbard wrote that "Destroy is the same as help to a psychiatrist". His 1958 writings cited "Psychiatry: The Greatest Flub of the Russian Civilization" by Tom Esterbrook; Hubbard's son would later reveal that Tom Eastebrook was one of Hubbard's many pen-names.

In 1966 Hubbard declared all-out war on psychiatry, telling Scientologists that "We want at least one bad mark on every psychiatrist in England, a murder, an assault, or a rape or more than one." He committed the Church of Scientology to the goal of eradicating psychiatry in 1969, announcing that "Our war has been forced to become 'To take over absolutely the field of mental healing on this planet in all forms.'"

By 1967, Hubbard claimed that psychiatrists were behind a worldwide conspiracy to attack Scientology and create a "world government" run by psychiatrists on behalf of the USSR:

Our enemies on this planet are less than twelve men. They are members of the Bank of England and other higher financial circles. They own and control newspaper chains, and they are, oddly enough, directors in all the mental health groups in the world which have sprung up. ... The rest of their apparent program was to use mental health—which is to say psychiatric electric shock and prefrontal lobotomy—to remove from their path any political dissenters. ... [T]hese fellows have gotten nearly every government in the world to owe them considerable quantities of money through various chicaneries, and they control of course income tax, the government finance. Wilson, for instance, the current premier of England, is totally involved with these fellows, and talks about nothing else actually.

— L. Ron Hubbard, Ron's Journal 67

Referring to psychiatrists as "psychs", Hubbard wrote of psychiatrists as denying human spirituality and peddling fake cures. He taught that psychiatrists were themselves deeply unethical individuals, committing "extortion, mayhem and murder. Our files are full of evidence on them."

Hubbard's efforts to cast the field of psychiatry as the source of all of humanity's problems are exemplified in a policy letter written in 1971, in which he attempted to redefine the word "psychiatrist" to mean "an antisocial enemy of the people":

Psychiatry and psychiatrist are easily redefined to mean 'an antisocial enemy of the people.' This takes the kill-crazy psychiatrist off the preferred list of professions. This is a good use of the technique [of redefining words] as for a century the psychiatrist has been setting an all-time record for inhumanity to Man.

Anti-psychiatric themes also appear in some of Hubbard's later fictional works. In Hubbard's ten-volume series Mission Earth, various characters debate the methods and validity of psychology. In his novel Battlefield Earth, the evil Catrists (a pun on psychiatrists), are described as a group of charlatans claiming to be mental health experts.

== See also ==
- Alaska Mental Health Enabling Act
- Anti-psychiatry
- Citizens Commission on Human Rights
