= Paramarsh =

- Genre: Non-Technical college fiesta
- Locations: Vadodara, India
- Founded: 2001
- Filing status: Student Run, Non-Profit Organization
- Sponsor: Faculty of Technology and Engineering, Maharaja Sayajirao University of Baroda
- Website: www.msu-paramarsh.org

Paramarsh is a national level, non-technical college fiesta, organized by the students of Faculty of Technology and Engineering, M. S. University, Vadodara, Gujarat. It is an annual 3-day gala of workshops and lectures for students. Started in 2001, Paramarsh is now in its 18th consecutive year with the distinction of being one of the biggest of its kind in the entire West zone.

== Introduction ==
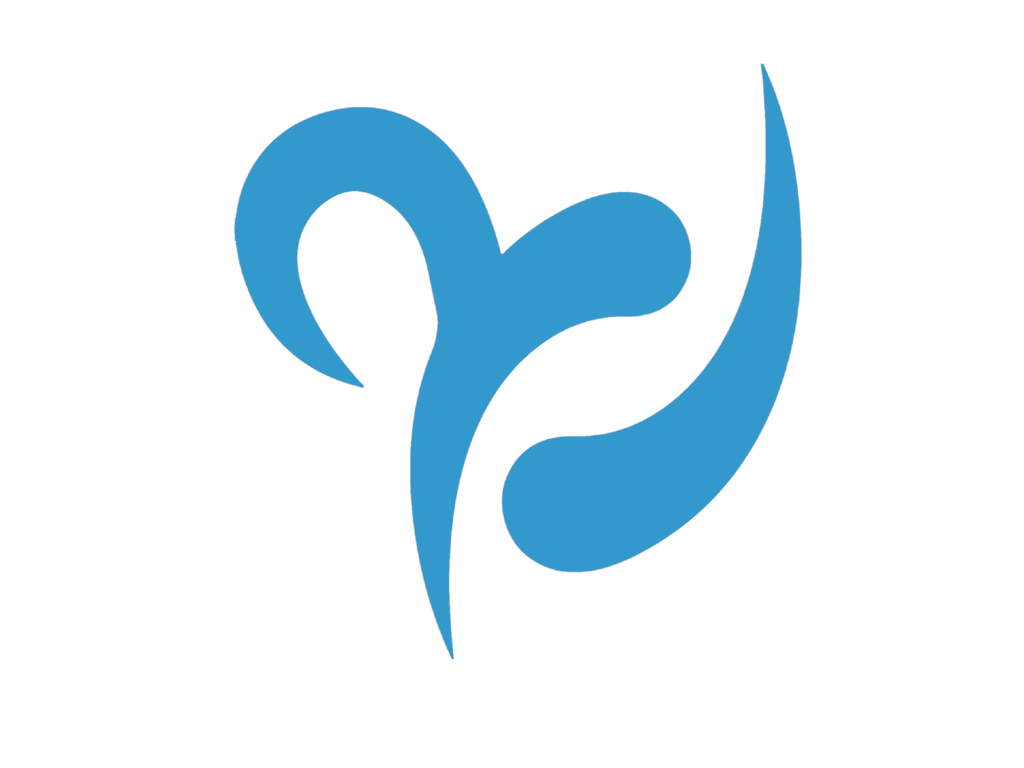
The logo for Paramarsh

The word Paramarsh has its roots in the Sanskrit language, meaning ‘Supreme Thought’. The 3-day long festival aims at improving soft skills among students for excellence in the corporate world. Conducted and managed by the budding engineers of M. S. University, Paramarsh is a non-profit organization that intends to inculcate the 7 commandments of corporate excellence: ‘Leadership’, ‘Team Spirit’, ‘Sportsmanship’, ‘Creativity’, ‘The Spirit of Adventure’, ‘The art of Oration’ and the ‘Science of Deduction’.

== History ==
The dawn of the new millennium brought about a change in the hiring strategy of companies. The recruiters now focused not only on technical knowledge but also emphasized communication skills, confidence, spontaneous thinking and the capability of working under pressure. An absence of this aptitude would affect the odds of recruitment. Working towards the amelioration of these prowesses, Paramarsh was started by a group of students as an intra-college event with just one event focusing on group discussion. Today, Paramarsh stands prodigious with 18 events under 7 categories which comprise a wide range of events focusing on various soft skills basically required in the corporate and industrial sector.

Through the years, Paramarsh has evolved and thrived, surpassing its previous edition by miles. And over this time period, there have been some significant events that have only contributed to the growing popularity of this festival. 2007 saw a guest performance by Gaurav Dagaonkar, the IIM-A graduate of ‘College Days’ fame. In 2008, Ankit Fadia, the bestselling author of ‘FASTER: 100 ways of improving your digital life’ and subsequent YouTube and MTV shows like ‘What The Hack’, came to Gujarat for the very first time to conduct a workshop on ‘Ethical hacking’. Another first time performers that Paramarsh gave to Gujarat were ‘Bombay Rockers’ in 2009. This Indian/Danish band with a five-time platinum album enthralled the audience with their hit songs. The same year also saw a riveting performance by the band ‘Agnee’ of Splitsvilla and Roadies fame.

In 2010, the musical instrument maestro Raghav Sachar was the highlight of the event. The 2011 edition of Paramarsh saw a mesmerizing live performance by Suraj Jagan who is famous for his song ‘Give Me Some Sunshine’ from the movie 3 Idiots. 2012 not only witnessed the presence of famous TV and theatre artist Deven Bhojani to judge ‘Goonj-A Street Play Competition’ but also saw a live performance by the famous Bollywood singer, Benny Dayal.

2013 was a year of high points with Tiku Talsania, the TV and movie artist judging ‘Goonj-A Street Play Competition’ and a confluence of 3 live performances by Paradigm Shift, a progressive rock band, Aditi Singh Sharma, Bollywood playback singer and the Indian God of Rock, Parikrama. The star attraction of this edition was a panel discussion titled ‘Follow Your Dreams’, held for the first time ever in Gujarat. The panellists were, Mr. Charu Sharma, an Indian commentator and quizmaster; Dr. Madhu Mehta, pioneer of the Indian Telecom Industry; Mr. Nitin Gupta, a stand-up comedy artist and founder and CEO of Entertainment Engineers and Dr. Anil Kane, the visionary behind Kalpasar Project and a corporate juggernaut.

Paramarsh 2014 with ‘Colosseum of Superheroes’ as its theme had a series of guest lectures by Dr.Kiran Bedi, the first woman IPS officer on the topic ‘Youth: Catalyst of Indian Revolution’ and Hussain Zaidi, the author of ‘Dongri To Dubai’ and other such books. He is also renowned for being the only journalist to interview Dawood Ibrahim after he left India. Siddharth Rajhans, a Google Analyst and founder of Spacify Incorporated, was present for an interactive session ‘Bridle the Bull’, which was aimed towards boosting entrepreneurship skills among engineers. ‘Tennets for a Shutterbug’ brought Money Sharma, a National Geographic Moments Award III winner, who took a 2-day workshop on photography. This edition of Paramarsh hosted the ‘Raghu Dixit Project’, a multi-lingual folk band, which captivated the audience with a passionate rendering of their songs.

The year 2015 with the theme "The Global Exodus" displayed prominent landmarks of the world all over the campus. The year marked the introduction of a new segment "Extravaganza" which attracted and entertained the crowd at Paramarsh. Ashwin Sanghi, writer of best selling conspiracy fiction and Ronen Sen, former India's ambassador to the United States inspired many young minds with their experiences. The editorial director of The New Indian Express, Prabhu Chawla enlightened the audience at "Transcendence" with his powerful thoughts.

Paramarsh 2016 with "La Cineaste" as its theme had a series of guest lectures by "Dr Krishnaswamy Kasturirangan" who is a former chairman of ISRO (1994–2003) and also the recipient of 3 major Indian civilian awards. He gave a lecture on his journey of ISRO.

The year 2016 added up a new segment to the glory "Startupedia - The Development Dialogue". It is based on the new startup ideas of youngsters providing them a quintessential platform. Many entrepreneurial rewards were the attraction for the participants, such as Silicon Valley incubation experience, mentorship within Google and Apple's entrepreneurial activities, fellowship program at Venture Studios and funding opportunities up to $10,000.

== Events ==
‘Your Say’ is an oratorical arena which focuses on English vocabulary and speaking skills. This domain consists of 3 major competitions: ‘Cat-as-Trophe’ being a group discussion event, ‘Block-n-Tackle’, being a debate competition and ‘The LexICONS’, which is a vocabulary-based event.

The next category forays into entrepreneurship skills with ‘Biz-Mantra’, a state level business treasure hunt, ‘Auction House’, a mock bidding event and ‘The Verdict’ being the latest entrant to this hub of business management and marketing prowess. Started in 2013, ‘The Verdict’ was an event based on laws and court case studies.

‘Paparazzi’ is the media galore of the festival with ‘24*7 Live’ covering all aspects of media and ‘Goonj’ which is a street play competition. Since the last two editions, this event has witnessed the presence of famous TV and theatre artists like Deven Bhojani in 2012 and Tiku Talsania in 2013.

Next is ‘Spectros’ with an assortment of 3 different events: ‘9!’ being a mathematical treasure hunt, ‘Wreckreation’, testing the participant's designing and creativity skills and ‘The Prime Suspect’, which is a crime scene investigation.

‘Escapade’ comprises two adventurous events namely, ‘Fantastic 4’ which focuses on inter personal skills and ‘Sirocco’ which checks the survival instincts.

‘I Din’ Noe That’ is a quiz competition with numerous stages, all testing a person's agglomeration of general knowledge.

‘Faneticz’ is the online cluster of events with ‘Etch-a-Sketch’, a doodle-making competition, ‘ViewFinder’, a photography event.

== Workshops ==
Paramarsh has been home to a myriad mélange of seminars, workshops and talk shows. It has been a cynosure of interactive sessions so as to ameliorate all-round development in the students. Acing campus interviews and achieving corporate excellence has always been an imperative aspect and workshops like ‘Campus Recruitment Training’ in 2008, ‘Campus to Corporate’ in 2011 and ‘To Corporate Odyssey’ in 2012 all focused on giving the students an insight to the functioning of the corporate world.

Ethical hacking is perceived to be the high road of cracking an organized and sanctioned practice of identifying vulnerabilities in software. Ankit Fadia organized a workshop on the same basis in 2008 and The Cyber Squad conducted another workshop titled ‘Hack Thy Hackers’.

For the movie aficionados ‘Visual FX’ in 2009 and ‘3D animation’ in 2010 were the toast of the event. ‘Digital Sound Mixing’ was the highlight in 2011 for the song enthusiasts. It is believed that dance is the language of the soul and a peek into the new-age dance forms was what Paramarsh offered with workshops on ‘Salsa’ in 2008, ‘Ballroom dance’ in 2009 and ‘B-Boying’ in 2010.

‘Tanni Rangavali’, ‘Calligraphy’, ‘Aero Flux’, ‘Radio Jockeying’, ‘Disc Jockeying’, ‘Glider Making’, ‘Martial arts’ and ‘Discover Thyself’ are just enumerating some of the workshops conducted over the years, keeping in mind the demands of the students. 2012 witnessed ‘Life in Cursive’ and ‘The Perma-Etch’ as the main attractions that catered to the creativ] souls. 2013 was a year for the logical minded with ‘The Sherlock Key’, a workshop organized by the Indian Forensic Organization. ‘The Pixel Alchemy’ gratified the Photoshop fanatics. ‘Ace the Assay’ was another workshop organized for the psychometric analysis of the participants and to train their minds to deal with stressful and unexpected scenarios.

The 2014 edition of Paramarsh turned out to be bigger and better. ‘Bridle the Bull’ was an entrepreneurship based workshop that saw Siddharth Rajhans, founder of Mindcraft Publications and an analyst at Google, impart business and marketing knowledge to the students. A photography workshop was organized ‘Tenet for a Shutterbug’ by Money Sharma, a National Geographic Moment Award season 3 winner and whose pictures have appeared in prestigious newspapers like The Huffington Post, New York Daily News and The Scotsman. 'The Corporate Launchpad' was a workshop organized to give the students a deeper insight into the recruitment process. ‘The Chromatic Coherence’ regaled the art aficionados with tricks and techniques of spray can painting.

== Interplays ==
Celebrated and acclaimed luminaries have visited Paramarsh throughout its journey for the benefaction of the students via exchange of knowledge, experiences and personal wisdom. Chetan Bhagat, the bestselling Indian author of books like Five Point Someone and 2 States: The Story of My Marriage was here for a panel discussion in 2008. Dr Nagesh, a record-holding hypnotist came in 2010 to conduct an interplay titled ‘Comic Hypnotism’. ‘Live Life King Size’ and ‘Soiree of Success’ were two remarkable interplays in 2012 while 2013 witnessed ‘The Laughter Riot’, a comedy interplay and ‘Be in The Top One Percent’. A vast multitude of seminars have been organized under the banner of Paramarsh that have conceptualized various genres. ‘abc of Stock Market’, ‘Full Throttle’, ‘Top Gear’, ‘Mind Reading’ and ‘ New Thinking, New Possibilities’ are just enumerating a few of them.

2013 also saw a panel discussion titled ‘Follow Your Dreams’ saw the confluence of four eminent stalwarts: Charu Sharma, Nitin Gupta, Dr Madhu Mehta and Dr Anil Kane that yielded a stimulating session with an innate aim of inspiring the students to aspire, act and achieve. The 14th edition had an interplay titled ‘Screw it, Let's Do It' focusing on inspiring the students and motivating them to keep working towards achieving their goals. Apart from these, there were two guest lectures by Dr. Kiran Bedi and Mr. Hussain Zaidi that were the attractions of the event.

== Pronites ==
Pronites have featured well-known and illustrious national artists from various music fortes like Rock, Bollywood and Classical.

Paramarsh has hosted renowned names from the music industry, right from the 4 Indian Idols - Chang, Parleen, Suhit and Abhishek in 2008 to Bombay Rockers and Agnee band of Roadies and Splitsvilla fame in 2009. 2010 witnessed a melodious performance by musical instrument maestro Raghav Sachar. Suraj Jagan, the famous Indian playback singer performed to an enraptured crowd in the year 2011.

2012 saw Benny Dayal of ‘Ekk Main Aur Ekk Tu’ and ‘Daaru Desi’ fame give an electrifying performance and 2013 saw the conflux of 3 major artists: Paradigm Shift, a Mumbai-based progressive rock band, Aditi Singh Sharma, the Bollywood playback singer of ‘Main Heroine Hoon’ fame and Parikrama, the Delhi-based band that is renowned to be the Indian God of Rock.

The year 2014 saw a soul rendering performance by the Raghu Dixit Project, a multi-lingual folk music band known for their unique combination of Indian traditional sounds and western medleys.

The last and the most awaited day of Paramarsh 2015 noted the imperishable performance by Tochi Raina and his "Band of Bandagi".

2016 edition hosted two euphorial concerts in the finale - "Shefali Alvares" and "Lagori Band", both under the banner of Coke Studio. Coke Studio was witnessed for the first time in Gujarat during Paramarsh 2016.

== E-Stuff ==
E-Stuff is the entertainment zone with an extensive line-up of on the spot games and events that are uniquely designed to attract and amuse the crowd. With innovative and fun-filled designs, Paramarsh conducted ‘Beach Football’ and ‘Wall-E-Ball’ which were instant hits with the crowd. 2012 saw the introduction of cricket with a twist in ‘The 22nd Yard’ and 2013 introduced ‘Home Run’, a softball-inspired tournament. Apart from changing the traditional kinks of the game, E-Stuff also provides an assortment of small games that engage the visiting crowd.

== Smokin’ Aces ==
Since its inception in 2007, Paramarsh has been conducting ‘The Battle of Bands’ under the banner of ‘Smokin’ Aces’. The competition is known to proffer up dexterous and talented bands ranging from the rock genre to the indie pop ones.

2007 saw a guest performance by the famous IIM-A graduate, Gaurav Dagaonkar. A mélange of headbanging music and passionate musicians, this annual event is awaited and is a major attraction with bands coming in from all over India.

2010 saw the band ‘Rubber Band’ winning the battle. In 2011, ‘Ecstasy’ won the competition and in 2012 ‘Immortal Knights’ took the title home. 2013 saw the band ‘Outro’ winning the competition. In 2014, the band ‘Aeon of Darkness’ won the battle of bands.

== Sanidhya ==
From 2012, Paramarsh with a clear vision to raise awareness amongst the society stepped forward through ‘Sanidhya-Awareness for Society’. Sanidhya has taken up the baton of bringing society in the proximity of several subjects of life that have either been forgotten or are unrealized so far. One of the several such subjects is a Group Discussion. It is one of the most important aspects for the college students to clinch a job. Many students face problems in their Placement Interviews, predominantly due to the lack of Interpersonal skills. Group Discussion forms the crux of the selection criteria, be it B-schools or campus interviews, wherein the students lack in presenting themselves mainly because they have never faced anything similar in their regular academics. But unfortunately, the school students aren't even aware of this form of oratory skill. In order to fill this gap, Paramarsh organized an event called ‘Speak To Win’ as a part of SANIDHYA, which strived to inculcate this requisite speaking skill in the school students. The seminar explained the importance of presentation skills and group discussion to nearly 2000 students from 10 different schools including English and Gujarati medium- viz. Reliance School, Baroda High School, Zenith School, Ambe Vidyalaya, Tejas Vidyalaya, Jeevan Sadhna, St. Kabir, Maharani School, Bright School (Ambalal Park) and Bright School (V.I.P Complex).

In 2013, Paramarsh organized a career counselling session ‘My Career, My Choice’ that provided the school students with an opportunity to seek guidance from teachers of various departments having years of experience so as to help them make the right career choice. With colleges offering numerous courses, it is truly confusing to make a choice. But for a student, choosing a career path that is far from ones’ interest and ability can cause dissatisfaction in the long run. Hence choosing the correct career is essential and it was with this in mind that Paramarsh, under the banner of Sanidhya, organized this session.

In 2014, we delved deeper into the pitfalls of the recruitment process and conducted a free workshop ‘Climbing the Corporate Ladder’ wherein corporate trainers provided guidance so as to develop the verbal ability and interview skills of the participants via SWOT analysis and to improve their public speaking skills. On World Environment Day, Paramarsh under the banner of Sanidhya decided to adopt the side dividers of the Akota-Dandia Bridge and plant saplings along the stretch. It was a small initiative to spread awareness on the growing disregard towards the environment and taking a small but firm step towards changing it. The campaign was graced by the honourable Deputy Mayor Mrs Seemaben Mohile. The same year we also conducted an interactive seminar titled ‘BANKING SIMPLIFIED’ familiarizing the school students with the concept of banking and the frauds related to net banking. They were informed about the workings of an ATM and the whole concept of a credit and debit card. Easy money transactions, the operational plan of bank accounts and new banking technologies were some of the other topics that were discussed. In a rapidly changing world driven by money and technology, it is more than necessary to teach students about the moolah monarchy. The radicalized world today demands a financially informed youth and this session aimed to provide a rudimentary foundation towards the same. The school students at the threshold of adulthood need a basic understanding of the bank system so that they form a part of a competent citizenry. With this in mind, Paramarsh organized this seminar in over 10 schools in Vadodara.

In 2015, A donation drive was conducted called "Winter on Wheels". It was a drive for collecting and donating blankets and warm clothing for northern Indian regions- Jammu Kashmir and more.

In 2016, conducted Adios Addiction - Our no tobacco campaign. To achieve something great, such as making our college the first tobacco-free college in the state of Gujarat; it doesn't require a huge step. Rather, it requires an assemblage of small conjoint steps.

== Spark ==
Spark is the souvenir of Paramarsh and forms an integral part of the event. Over the years this booklet-cum-advertorial has managed to capture through words the soul of Paramarsh. Every passing edition has radicalized Paramarsh and each new editor has brought a novel nuance to the event.

== Organization ==
Paramarsh is a non-profit, student-run organization which started back in 2001. It includes students from all the fields of engineering who run this event without any assistance from professionals or event management companies.
