= Olfactory reference syndrome =

False belief of emitting pungent body odors

Olfactory reference syndrome (ORS) is a psychiatric condition in which there is a persistent false belief and preoccupation with the idea of emitting abnormal body odors which the patient thinks are foul and offensive to other individuals. People with this condition often misinterpret others' behaviors, e.g. sniffing, touching their nose or opening a window, as being referential to an unpleasant body odor which in reality is non-existent and cannot be detected by other people.

This disorder is often accompanied by shame, embarrassment, significant distress, avoidance behavior, social phobia and social isolation.

== Signs and symptoms ==
The onset of ORS may be sudden, where it usually follows after a precipitating event, or gradual.

=== Odor complaint ===
The defining feature of ORS is excessive thoughts of having offensive body odor(s) which are detectable to others. The individual may report that the odor comes from: the nose and/or mouth, i.e. halitosis (bad breath); the anus; the genitals; the skin generally; or specifically the groin, armpits or feet. The source(s) of the supposed odor may also change over time. There are also some who are unsure of the exact origin of the odor. The odor is typically reported to be continuously present. The character of the odor may be reported as similar to bodily substances, e.g. feces, flatus, urine, sweat, vomitus, semen, vaginal secretions; or alternatively it may be an unnatural, non-human or chemical odor, e.g. ammonia, detergent, rotten onions, burnt rags, candles, garbage, burning fish, medicines, old cheese. Again, the reported character of the odor complaint may change over time. Halitosis appears to be the most common manifestation of ORS, with 75% complaining of bad breath, alone or in combination with other odors. The next most common complaint was sweat (60%).

Although all individuals with ORS believe they have an odor, in some cases the individual reports they cannot perceive the odor themselves. In the latter cases, the belief arises via misinterpretation of the behavior of others or with the rationale that a disorder of smell which prevents self detection of the odor (i.e. anosmia) exists. In the cases where the non-existent odor can be detected, this is usually considered as phantosmia (olfactory hallucination). Olfactory hallucination can be considered the result of the belief in an odor delusion, or the belief a result of the olfactory hallucination. In one review, the individual with ORS was unreservedly convinced that he or she could detect the odor themselves in 22% of cases, whilst in 19% there was occasional or intermittent detection and in 59% lack of self-detection was present.

Some distinguish delusional and non-delusional forms of ORS. In the delusional type, there is complete conviction that the odor is real. In the non-delusional type, the individual is capable of some insight into the condition, and can recognize that the odor might not be real, and that their level of concern is excessive. Others argue that reported cases of ORS present a spectrum of different levels of insight. Since sometimes the core belief of ORS is not of delusional intensity, it is argued that considering the condition as a form of delusional disorder, as seems to occur in the DSM, is inappropriate. In one review, in 57% of cases the beliefs were fixed, held with complete conviction, and the individual could not be reassured that the odor was non existent. In 43% of cases the individual held the beliefs with less than complete conviction, and was able in varying degrees to consider the possibility that the odor was non-existent.

Other symptoms may be reported and are claimed to be related to the cause of the odor, such as malfunction of the anal sphincter, a skin disease, "diseased womb", stomach problems or other unknown organic disease. Excessive washing in ORS has been reported to cause the development of eczema.

=== Referential ideas ===
People with ORS misinterpret the behavior of others as being related to the imagined odor (thoughts of reference). In one review, ideas of reference were present in 74% of cases. Usually, these involve misinterpretations of comments, gestures and actions of other people such that it is believed that an offensive smell from the individual is being referred to. These thoughts of reference are more pronounced in social situations which the individual with ORS may find stressful, such as public transport, crowded lift, workplace, classroom, etc. Example behaviors which are misinterpreted include coughing, sneezing, turning of the head, opening a window, facial expressions, sniffing, touching nose, scratching head, gestures, moving away, avoiding the person, whistling. Commonly, when being in proximity to others who are talking among themselves, persons with ORS will be convinced that the conversation is about his or her odor. Even the actions of animals (e.g. barking of dogs) can be interpreted as referential to an odor. Persons with ORS may have trouble concentrating at a given task or in particular situations due to obsessive thoughts concerning body odor.

=== Repetitive behavior ===
95% of persons with ORS engage in at least one excessive hygiene, grooming or other related repetitive practice in an attempt to alleviate, mask and monitor the perceived odor. This has been described as a contrite reaction, and repetitive, counterphobic, "safety", ritual or compulsive behaviors. Despite these measures, the odor symptom is reported to still offend other people. Example ORS behaviors include: repetitive showering and other grooming behaviors, excessive tooth brushing, or tongue scraping (a treatment for halitosis), repeated smelling of oneself to check for any odor, over-frequent bathroom use, attempts to mask the odor, with excessive use of deodorants, perfumes, mouthwash, mint, chewing gum, scented candles, and soap; changing clothes (e.g. underwear), multiple times per day, frequent washing of clothes, wearing several layers of clothing, wrapping feet in plastic, wearing garments marketed as odor-reducing, eating special diets, dietary supplements (e.g. intended to reduce flatulence odor), repeatedly seeking reassurance from others that there is no odor, although the negative response is usually interpreted instead as politeness rather than truth, and avoidance behaviors such as habitually sitting at a distance from others, minimizing movement in an attempt "not to spread the odor", keeping the mouth closed and avoiding talking or talking with a hand in front of the mouth.

=== Functional impairment ===
Persons with ORS tend to develop a behavior pattern of avoidance of social activities and progressive social withdrawal. They often avoid travel, dating, relationships, break off engagements and avoid family activities. Due to shame and embarrassment, they may avoid school or work, or repeatedly change jobs and move to another town. Significant developments may occur such as loss of employment, divorce, becoming housebound, psychiatric hospitalization, and suicide attempts. According to some reports, 74% of persons with ORS avoid social situations, 47% avoid work, academic or other important activities, 40% had been housebound for at least one week because of ORS, and 31.6% had experienced psychiatric hospitalization. With regards to suicide, reports range from 43 to 68% with suicidal ideation, and 32% with a history of at least one suicide attempt. 5.6% died by suicide.

=== Psychiatric co-morbidity ===
Psychiatric co-morbidity in ORS is reported. Depression, which is often severe, may be a result of ORS, or may be pre-existing. Personality disorders, especially cluster C, and predominantly the avoidant type, may exist with ORS. Bipolar disorder, schizophrenia, hypochondriasis, substance abuse and obsessive–compulsive disorder may also be co-morbid with ORS.

== Causes ==
The causes of ORS are unknown. It is thought that significant negative experiences may trigger the development of ORS. These have been considered as two types: key traumatic experiences related to smell, and life stressors present when the condition developed but which were unrelated to smell. In one review, 85% of reported cases had traumatic, smell-related experiences, and 17% of cases had stress factors unrelated to smell.

Reported smell-related experiences usually revolve around family members, friends, co-workers, peers or other people making comments about an odor from the person, which causes embarrassment and shame. Examples include accusations of flatulence during a religious ceremony, being bullied for flatulence, urinary or fecal incontinence in class, announcements about a passenger needing to use deodorant over speaker by a driver on public transport, sinusitis which caused a bad taste in the mouth, mockery about a fish odor from a finger which had been inserted into the person's vagina in the context of a sexual assault, and revulsion about menarche and brother's sexual intimacy. It has been suggested that a proportion of such reported experiences may not have been real, but rather early symptom of ORS (i.e. referential thoughts). Examples of non smell-related stressful periods include guilt due to a romantic affair, being left by a partner, violence in school, family illness when growing up (e.g. cancer), and bullying.

The importance of a family history of mental illness or other conditions in ORS is unclear, because most reported cases have lacked this information. In some cases, there has been reported psychiatric and medical conditions in first degree relatives such as schizophrenia, psychosis, alcoholism, suicide, affective disorders, obsessive compulsive disorder, anxiety, paranoia, neurosis, sociopathy, and epilepsy. Sometimes more than one family member had a noteworthy condition.

Neuroimaging has been used to investigate ORS. Hexamethylpropyleneamine oxime single-photon emission computed tomography (HMPAO SPECT) demonstrated hypoperfusion of the frontotemporal lobe in one case. That is to say, part of the brain was receiving insufficient blood flow. In another, functional magnetic resonance imaging was carried out while the person with ORS listened to both neutral words and emotive words. Compared to an age and sex matched healthy control subject under the same conditions, the individual with ORS showed more activation areas in the brain when listening to emotionally loaded words. This difference was described as abnormal, but less pronounced as would be observed in the brain of a person with a psychotic disorder.

== Diagnosis ==
=== Classification ===
Although the existence of ORS is generally accepted, there is some controversy as to whether it is a distinct condition or merely a part or manifestation of other psychiatric conditions, mainly due to the overlapping similarities. Likewise, there is controversy with regards how the disorder should be classified. As ORS has obsessive and compulsive features, some consider it as a type of obsessive–compulsive spectrum disorder, while others consider it an anxiety disorder due to the strong anxiety component. It is also suggested to be a type of body dysmorphic disorder or, as it involves a single delusional belief, some suggest that ORS is a monosymptomatic hypochondriacal psychosis (hypochondriacal type of delusional disorder, see monothematic delusion).

The World Health Organization's 10th revision of the International Statistical Classification of Diseases and Related Health Problems (ICD-10) does not have a specific entry for ORS, or use the term. However, in the "persistent delusional disorders" section, ICD-10 states that affected individuals can "express a conviction that others think that they smell."

ORS has also never been allocated a dedicated entry in any edition of the American Psychiatric Association's Diagnostic and Statistical Manual of Mental Disorders. In the third edition (DSM-III), ORS was mentioned under "atypical somatoform disorders". The revised third edition (DSM-III-R) mentions ORS in the text, stating that "convictions that the person emits a foul odor are one of the most common types of delusion disorder, somatic type." The fourth edition (DSM-IV), does not use the term ORS but again mentions such a condition under "delusional disorder, somatic type", stating "somatic delusions can occur in several forms. Most common are the person's conviction that he or she emits a foul odor from the skin, mouth, rectum or vagina." In the fifth edition (DSM-5), ORS again does not appear as a distinct diagnosis, but it is mentioned in relation to taijin kyōfushō (対人恐怖症, "disorder of fear of personal interaction"). The variants of taijin kyōfushō (shubo-kyofu "the phobia of a deformed body" and jikoshu-kyofu "fear of foul body odor") are listed under 300.3 (F42) "other specified obsessive compulsive and related disorders", and is about someone's fear that his or her body, or its functions, is offensive to other people. There are four subtypes of taijin kyōfushō. 17% of these individuals have "the phobia of having foul body odor", the subtype termed jikoshu-kyofu. Although taijin kyōfushō has been described as a culture-bound syndrome confined to east Asia (e.g. Japan and Korea), it has been suggested that the jikoshu-kyofu variant of taijin kyōfushō is closely related or identical to ORS, and that such a condition occurs in other cultures. However, some Western sources state that jikoshu-kyofu and ORS are distinguishable because of cultural differences, i.e. Western culture being primarily concerned with individual needs, and Japanese culture primarily with the needs of the many. Hence, it is claimed that ORS mainly focuses on the affected individual's embarrassment, and jikoshu-kyofu is focused on the fear of creating embarrassment in others. In this article, jikoshu-kyofu and ORS are considered as one condition.

Synonyms for ORS, many historical, include bromidrosiphobia, olfactory phobic syndrome, chronic olfactory paranoid syndrome, autodysomophobia, delusions of bromosis, hallucinations of smell and olfactory delusional syndrome. By definition, the many terms which have been suggested in the dental literature to refer to subjective halitosis complaints (i.e. when a person complains of halitosis yet no odor is detectable clinically) can also be considered under the umbrella of ORS. Examples include halitophobia, non-genuine halitosis, delusional halitosis, pseudo-halitosis, imaginary halitosis, psychosomatic halitosis, and self halitosis.

=== Diagnostic criteria ===
Diagnostic criteria have been proposed for ORS:

- Persistent (more than six months), false belief that one emits an offensive odor, which is not perceived by others. There may be degrees of insight (i.e. the belief may or may not be of delusional intensity).
- This pre-occupation causes clinically significant distress (depression, anxiety, shame), social and occupational disability, or may be time-consuming (i.e. preoccupies the individual at least one hour per day).
- The belief is not a symptom of schizophrenia or other psychotic disorder, and not due to the effects of medication or recreational drug abuse, or any other general medical condition.

=== Differential diagnosis ===
The differential diagnosis for ORS may be complicated as the disorder shares features with other conditions. Consequently, ORS may be misdiagnosed as another medical or psychiatric condition and vice versa.

The typical history of ORS involves a long delay while the person continues to believe there is a genuine odor. On average, a patient with ORS goes undiagnosed for about eight years. Repeated consultation with multiple different non-psychiatric medical specialists ("doctor shopping") in an attempt to have their non-existent body odor treated is frequently reported. Individuals with ORS may present to dermatologists, gastroentrologists, otolaryngologists, dentists, proctologists, and gynecologists. Despite the absence of any clinically detectable odor, physicians and surgeons may embark on unnecessary investigations (e.g. gastroscopy), and treatments, including surgical procedures such as thoracic sympathectomy, tonsillectomy, or others. Such treatments generally have no long-term effect on the individual's belief in an odor symptom. If non-psychiatric clinicians refuse to carry out treatment on the basis that there is no real odor and offer to refer the patient to a psychologist or psychiatrist, persons with ORS typically refuse and instead seek "a better" doctor or dentist.

Conversely, some have suggested that medical conditions which cause genuine odor may sometimes be misdiagnosed as ORS. There are a great many different medical conditions which are reported to potentially cause a genuine odor, and these are usually considered according to the origin of the odor, e.g. halitosis (bad breath), bromhidrosis (body odor), etc. These conditions are excluded before a diagnosis of ORS is made. Although there are many different publications on topics like halitosis, the symptom is still poorly understood and managed in practice. It is recognized that symptoms such as halitosis can be intermittent, and therefore may not be present at the time of the consultation, leading to misdiagnosis. Individuals with genuine odor symptoms may present with similar mindset and behavior to persons with ORS. For example, one otolaryngologist researcher noted "behavioral problems such as continuous occupation with oral hygiene issues, obsessive use of cosmetic breath freshening products such as mouthwashes, candies, chewing gums, and sprays, avoiding close contact with other people, and turning the head away during conversation" as part of what was termed "skunk syndrome" in patients with genuine halitosis secondary to chronic tonsillitis. Another author, writing about halitosis, noted that there are generally three types of persons which complain of halitosis: those with above-average odor, those with average or near-average odor who are oversensitive, and those with below-average or no odor who believe they have offensive breath. Therefore, in persons with genuine odor complaints, the distress and concern may typically be out of proportion to the reality of the problem. Genuine halitosis has been described as a social barrier between the individual and friends, relatives, partners and colleagues, and may negatively alter self-esteem and quality of life. Similar psychosocial problems are reported in other conditions which cause genuine odor symptoms. In the literature on halitosis, emphasis is frequently placed on multiple consultations to reduce the risk of misdiagnosis, and also asking the individual to have a reliable confidant accompany them to the consultation who can confirm the reality of the reported symptom. ORS patients are unable to provide such confidants as they have no objective odor.

Various organic diseases may cause parosmias (distortion of the sense of smell). Since smell and taste are intimately linked senses, disorders of gustation (e.g. dysgeusia—taste dysfunction) can present as a complaint related to smell, and vice versa. These conditions, collectively termed chemosensory dysfunctions, are many and varied, and they may trigger a person to complain of an odor than is not present; however, the diagnostic criteria for ORS require the exclusion of any such causes. They include pathology of the right hemisphere of the brain, substance abuse, arteriovenous malformations in the brain, and temporal lobe epilepsy.

Social anxiety disorder (SAD) and ORS have some demographic and clinical similarities. Where the social anxiety and avoidance behavior is primarily focussed on concern about body odors, ORS is a more appropriate diagnosis than avoidant personality disorder or SAD. Body dismorphic disorder (BDD) has been described as the closest diagnosis in DSM-IV to ORS as both primarily focus on bodily symptoms. The defining difference between the two is that in BDD the preoccupation is with physical appearance, not body odors. Similarly, where obsessive behaviors are directly and consistently related to body odors rather than anything else, ORS is a more appropriate diagnosis than obsessive–compulsive disorder, in which obsessions are different and multiple over time.

ORS may be misdiagnosed as schizophrenia. About 13% of people with schizophrenia have olfactory hallucinations. Generally, schizophrenic hallucinations are perceived as having an imposed, external origin, while in ORS they are recognized as originating from the individual. The suggested diagnostic criteria mean that the possibility of ORS is negated by a diagnosis of schizophrenia in which persistent delusions of an offensive body odor and olfactory hallucinations are contributing features for criterion A. However, some reported ORS cases were presented as co-morbid. Indeed, some have suggested that ORS may in time transform into schizophrenia, but others state there is little evidence for this. Persons with ORS have none of the other criteria to qualify for a diagnosis of schizophrenia.

It has been suggested that various special investigations may be indicated to help rule out some of the above conditions. Depending upon the case, this might include neuroimaging, thyroid and adrenal hormone tests, and analysis of body fluids (e.g. blood) with gas chromatography.

== Treatment ==
There is no agreed treatment protocol. In most reported cases of ORS the attempted treatment was antidepressants, followed by antipsychotics and various psychotherapies. Little data are available regarding the efficacy of these treatments in ORS, but some suggest that psychotherapy yields the highest rate of response to treatment, and that antidepressants are more effective than antipsychotics (response rates 78%, 55% and 33% respectively). According to one review, 43% of cases which showed overall improvement required more than one treatment approach, and in only 31% did the first administered treatment lead to some improvement.

Pharmacotherapies that have been used for ORS include antidepressants, (e.g. selective serotonin reuptake inhibitors, tricyclic antidepressants, monoamine oxidase inhibitors), antipsychotics, (e.g. blonanserin, lithium, chlorpromazine), and benzodiazepines. The most common treatment used for ORS is SSRIs. Specific antidepressants that have been used include clomipramine.

Psychotherapies that have been used for ORS include cognitive behavioral therapy, eye movement desensitization and reprocessing. Dunne (2015) reported a Case Study treatment of ORS using EMDR which was successful using a trauma model formulation rather than an OCD approach.

== Prognosis ==
When untreated, the prognosis for ORS is generally poor. It is chronic, lasting many years or even decades with worsening of symptoms rather than spontaneous remission. Transformation to another psychiatric condition is unlikely, although very rarely what appears to be ORS may later manifest into schizophrenia, psychosis, mania, or major depressive disorder. The most significant risk is suicide.

When treated, the prognosis is better. In one review, the proportion of treated ORS cases which reported various outcomes were assessed. On average, the patients were followed for 21 months (range: two weeks to ten years). With treatment, 30% recovered (i.e. no longer experienced ORS odor beliefs and thoughts of reference), 37% improved and in 33% there was a deterioration in the condition (including suicide) or no change from the pre-treatment status.

== Epidemiology ==
Cases have been reported from many different countries around the world. It is difficult to estimate the prevalence of ORS in the general population because data are limited and unreliable, and due to the delusional nature of the condition and the characteristic secrecy and shame.

For unknown reasons, males appear to be affected twice as commonly as females. High proportions of ORS patients are unemployed, single, and not socially active. The average age reported is around 20–21 years, with almost 60% of cases occurring in subjects under 20 in one report, although another review reported an older average age for both males (29) and females (40).

== History ==
The term olfactory reference syndrome was first proposed in 1971 by William Pryse-Phillips. Prior to this, published descriptions of what is now thought to be ORS appear from the late 1800s, with the first being Potts 1891. Often the condition was incorrectly described as other conditions, e.g. schizophrenia.

== Society ==
In modern times, commercial advertising pressures have altered the public's attitude towards problems such as halitosis, which have taken on greater negative psychosocial sequelae as a result. For example, in the United States, a poll reported that 55–75 million citizens consider bad breath a "principal concern" during social encounters.

== Etymology ==
The term olfactory reference syndrome comes from:

- Olfactory, pertaining to the sense of smell.
- Reference, because of the belief that the behavior of others is referential to a supposed odor (ideas and delusions of reference).
- Syndrome, because it is a recognizable set of features that occur together.

== See also ==
- Fish Odor syndrome
- Bad breath
- Taijin kyofusho, a similar condition more prevalent in Japan and Korea
- Delusion of reference
- Schizophrenia
- Delusional disorder
- Bipolar disorder
