= Michael Liebowitz =

American psychiatrist

Michael R. Liebowitz
- Education: Yale University (B.A, 1965); Yale University School of Medicine (M.D., 1969)
- Occupations: psychiatrist, medical researcher, professor, author
- Known for: research work in anxiety disorders Liebowitz social anxiety scale

Michael R. Liebowitz is a Columbia University psychiatrist and founder of the Anxiety Disorders Clinic, the first of its kind, at the New York State Psychiatric Institute. Liebowitz pioneered research on the molecular basis of love and wrote a book on the topic, "The Chemistry of Love."

== Early life and education ==
He was educated at Yale University, graduating with a B.A. (Cum Laude) in 1965, and with an M.D. degree from its medical school in 1969.

Liebowitz did his medical internship and medical residency at Harlem Hospital in New York City from 1969 to 1971 and, from 1974 to 1977, his psychiatric residencies were completed at the Medical Center Hospital of Vermont and the New York State Psychiatric Institute.

== Career ==
In 1985, he researched and highlighted an under-recognized status of social anxiety disorder (SAD). This led to subsequent cognitive research and treatments for anxiety disorders. He created the Liebowitz social anxiety scale, now a widely used primary outcome measure in clinical research on SAD.

In 1997 he established the Medical Research Network in New York City which performs studies on medicines.

In 2007, Liebowitz retired as Director of the Anxiety Disorders Clinic at the New York State Psychiatric Institute, a position which he had held since 1982.

Since 1977, he has been an instructor and professor of Medicine (Clinical Psychiatry) at Columbia University College of Physicians and Surgeons.

== Popular works ==
- Author of the 1983 book The Chemistry of Love, and for sparking the "chocolate theory of love," which attributes chocolate's supposed aphrodisiac effects to phenethylamine.
