= David Veale =

British psychiatrist

David Mikael William Veale is a British psychiatrist. He is a visiting professor in cognitive behavioural psychotherapies at the Institute of Psychiatry, Psychology and Neuroscience, King's College London and a consultant psychiatrist at the South London and Maudsley NHS Foundation Trust. He has conducted a range of clinical research, especially in body dysmorphic disorder, obsessive–compulsive disorder, emetophobia, and depression.

== Education ==
He holds an MPhil (1989) and an M.D. (1995) from the University of London.

== Research work ==
His main clinical expertise is in treatment of obsessive–compulsive disorder, body dysmorphic disorder (BDD), emetophobia and depression. He has developed and evaluated protocols for BDD and emetophobia that are used by other cognitive behaviour therapists (CBT).

As a seasoned expert in researching and treating body dysmorphic disorder, he has observed that anxiety related to penile size is a common issue, often associated with notions of masculinity and virility. Men tend to overestimate what is considered a normal size among their peers. Attempting to solve this issue as an appearance problem by obsessively altering or hiding one's physical appearance can result in increased distress and preoccupation. Alternatively, treating it as an emotional problem and working to increase one's tolerance to anxiety may be more effective.

He is the first author or been a co-author on the first randomized controlled trial (RCT) on CBT v a wait list in body dysmorphic disorder (Veale et al., 1996); the first RCT on CBT v anxiety management control in BDD (Veale et al., 2010); the first RCT on CBT for BDD in adolescence (Mataix-Cols, 2015); the first RCT on CBT for emetophobia (Riddle-Walker et al., 2016) and the first RCT on triple chronotherapy in out-patients with depression (Veale et al. 2021).

== Publications ==
=== Books ===
- Keyes, A.; Veale, D. (2021). Free Yourself from Emetophobia: A CBT Self-Help Guide for a Fear of Vomiting. Jessica Kingsley Publishers.
- Veale, D.; Neziroglu, F. (2010). Body Dysmorphic Disorder: A Treatment Manual. John Wiley & Sons. doi:10.1002/9780470684610. ISBN 9780470684610.
- Veale, D.; Willson, R. (2005). Overcoming Obsessive Compulsive Disorder. Robinson.

=== Selected Journal articles ===
- Riddle-Waker, L.; Veale, D. (2016). "Cognitive behaviour therapy for a specific phobia of vomiting (emetophobia): a pilot randomized controlled trial". Journal of Anxiety Disorders. 43: 14–22. doi:10.1016/j.janxdis.2016.07.005. PMID 27472452.
- Veale, D. (1996). "Body Dysmorphic Disorder: a cognitive behavioural model and a pilot randomised controlled trial". Behaviour Research and Therapy. 34 (9): 717–729. doi:10.1016/0005-7967(96)00025-3. PMID 8936754.
- Veale, D. (2014). "Efficacy of Cognitive Behaviour Therapy versus Anxiety Management for Body Dysmorphic Disorder: A Randomized Controlled Trial". Psychotherapy and Psychosomatics. 83 (6): 341–353. doi:10.1159/000360740. PMID 25323062. S2CID 3221449.
- Veale, D. (2021). "A preliminary investigation of a novel method to manipulate penis length to measure female sexual satisfaction: a single case experimental design". BJU International. n/a (n/a). doi:10.1111/bju.15416. PMID 33793040. S2CID 232482227.
