= Taijin kyofusho =

Japanese social phobia

- Specialty: Psychology

Taijin kyofusho (Japanese: 対人恐怖症, TKS, for taijin kyofusho symptoms) is a Japanese culture-specific syndrome. The term taijin kyofusho translates into the disorder (sho) of fear (kyofu) of interpersonal relations (taijin). Those who have taijin kyofusho are likely to be extremely embarrassed about themselves or fearful of displeasing others when it comes to the functions of their bodies or their appearances. These bodily functions and appearances include their faces, odor, actions, or looks. Examples include fear of eye-to-eye confrontation, blushing, and giving off unpleasant facial expression or body odor. They do not want to embarrass other people with their presence. This culture-bound syndrome is a social phobia based on fear and anxiety.

The symptoms of this disorder include avoiding social outings and activities, rapid heartbeat, shortness of breath, panic attacks, trembling, and feelings of dread and panic when around people. The causes of this disorder are mainly from emotional trauma or psychological defense mechanism. It is more common in men than women. Lifetime prevalence is estimated at 3–13%.

== Subcategories ==
Taijin kyofusho is commonly described as a form of social anxiety (social phobia), with the person dreading and avoiding social contact, and as a subtype of shinkeishitsu (anxiety disorder). However, instead of a fear of embarrassing themselves or being harshly judged by others because of their social ineptness, sufferers of taijin kyofusho report a fear of offending or harming other people. The focus is thus on avoiding harm to others rather than to oneself.

In the fifth edition of the Diagnostic and Statistical Manual of Mental Disorders (DSM-5) it is instead considered a sub-category of the "Other Specified Obsessive-Compulsive and Related Disorder" category [300.3 (F42)], where variants of taijin kyofusho are "Shubo-kyofu [...] that is similar to body dysmorphic disorder and is characterized by excessive fear of having a bodily deformity" and "Jikoshu-kyofu [...] characterized by fear of having an offensive body odor".

The revised edition of the DSM-5 even breaks taijin kyofusho down into two different subtypes: sensitive and offensive. The first subtype can be broken into two parts that are classical type and avoidant type. The classical type being afraid of being judged negatively because of physical signs of anxiety and feeling shame due to anxiety. The physical signs that can cause fear of being judged include sweating and tremors. The second subtype deals with people thinking something about them is offensive. Some of their fears include body odor, gas, excessive or insufficient eye contact, blushing, etc.

In the official Japanese diagnostic system, taijin kyofusho is subdivided into the following categories:

- Sekimen-kyofu (Japanese: 赤面恐怖), the phobia of blushing (ereuthophobia)
- Shubo-kyofu (Japanese: 醜貌恐怖), the phobia of a deformed body, similar to body dysmorphic disorder
- Jikoshisen-kyofu (Japanese: 自己視線恐怖), the phobia of eye contact
- Jikoshu-kyofu (Japanese: 自己臭恐怖), the phobia of having foul body odor (also termed olfactory reference syndrome, osmophobia or bromidrosiphobia)

Japanese psychologists also recognize additional types of taijin kyofusho based on severity:

- Transient: This type of taijin kyofusho is short-lived and moderately severe. It most commonly appears in teens, but may occur at any time.
- Delusional: This is the most common type of taijin kyofusho and is the most similar to social phobia. It is chronic, often begins before the age of 30, and varies in severity from moderate to severe.
- Phobic with schizophrenia: This is a more complicated disorder. In such cases, rather than a phobia, taijin kyofusho is a manifestation of schizophrenic symptoms.

== Diagnosis ==
A person may be diagnosed with taijin kyofusho if they feel as if their attitudes, behavior, and physical characteristics are inadequate in social situations. As a result of these feelings, they also experience persistent suffering in the form of emotional distress through shame, embarrassment, anxiety, fear, and other tense feelings that occur when confronted with social circumstances. In addition, individuals also worry about being unable to maintain healthy relationships with others. When it comes to socializing, taijin kyofusho sufferers avoid painful social and interpersonal situations, while simultaneously being averse to doing so. Those likely to develop taijin kyofusho have more of a temperamental characteristic of being hypochondriacal. The balance between introversion and extroversion in hypochondriacal temperament is geared more towards introversion. The introversion causes sufferers to focus on themself and problems they have, and by fixating on their weaknesses they become more anxious and depressed.

== Treatment ==
The standard Japanese treatment for taijin kyofusho is Morita therapy, developed by Shoma Morita in the 1910s as a treatment for the Japanese mental disorders taijin kyofusho and shinkeishitsu (nervousness). The original regimen involved patient isolation, enforced bed rest, diary writing, manual labor, and lectures on the importance of self-acceptance and positive endeavor. Since the 1930s, the treatment has been modified to include out-patient and group treatments. This modified version is known as neo-Morita therapy. Medications have also gained acceptance as a treatment option for taijin kyofusho. Other treatments include systematic desensitization, which includes slowly exposing one self to the fear, and learning relaxation skills, to extinguish fear and anxiety.

Milnacipran, a serotonin–norepinephrine reuptake inhibitor (SNRI), is currently used in the treatment of taijin kyofusho and has been shown to be efficacious for the related social anxiety disorder. The primary aspect of treating this disorder is getting patients to focus their attention on their body parts and sensations.

== Prevalence ==
Typically, this disease is presaged by a childhood history of social inhibition and shyness. It is possible that it could result from a humiliating traumatic experience, or it could emerge from a lifelong onset of the illness that only comes to the surface after time.

Clinical data indicates that more males have the condition than females, despite the fact that females scored higher on a social phobia scale than men, and report higher scores on proclivity towards feelings of embarrassment. This differs from Western society where the prevalence of females with social phobias is to some extent greater than that of males. In addition, studies have found that the disorder is common in older generations. The lifetime prevalence of the disorder falls anywhere between 3% and 13% with changes in severity occurring throughout one's lifetime. It is estimated that about 17% of individuals with taijin kyofusho have fears of releasing foul body odor. Although sometimes undiagnosed, symptoms of taijin kyofusho are not uncommon in Japan.

== See also ==
- Anthropophobia
- Avoidant personality disorder
- Fear of negative evaluation
- Olfactory reference syndrome, a similar condition more prevalent in Western societies
- Hikikomori
- Inner critic
- Internalized oppression
- NEET
- Obsessive–compulsive disorder
- Scrupulosity
- Self-deprecation
