= Journal of Anxiety Disorders =

- Discipline: Psychiatry
- Language: English
- Edited by: Gordon J. G. Asmundson

Publication details
- History: 1987–present
- Publisher: Elsevier
- Frequency: Bimonthly
- Impact factor: 5.26 (2020)

Standard abbreviations
- ISO 4: J. Anxiety Disord.

Indexing
- CODEN: JADIE8
- ISSN: 0887-6185
- LCCN: 87640829
- OCLC no.: 971972209

Links
- Journal homepage; Online access

The Journal of Anxiety Disorders is a bimonthly peer-reviewed interdisciplinary academic journal publishing research on all aspects of anxiety disorders across the lifespan (child, adolescent, adult, and geriatric populations). Gordon J. G. Asmundson (University Regina) serves as the Editor-In-Chief of the journal with associate editors Lauren S. Hallion (University of Pittsburgh), Alexendre Heeren (Catholic University of Louvain), Peter McEvoy (Curtin University), Carmen McLean (VA National Centre for Post Traumatic Stress Disorder), Michelle G. Newman (Pennsylvania State University), and Jasper A. Smits (University of Texas). The Journal of Anxiety Disorders has a Cite Score of 6.6 and an impact factor of 5.264 (2020) ranking it 17th out of 131 journals in clinical psychology.

== Scope of the journal ==
A diverse range of topics are covered as they relate to anxiety disorders and is inclusive of disorders that were previously categorized as anxiety related disorders (obsessive-compulsive disorder, posttraumatic stress disorder) in addition to the new category of illness anxiety disorder. The journal publishes across a variety of disciplines with the inclusion of research on traditional, behavioural, cognitive, and biological assessment; diagnosis and classification, psychosocial and psychopharmacological treatment, genetics, epidemiology, and prevention. Theoretical and review articles contributing to the advancement of knowledge in the field are also considered.

== Indexing of publications ==
The Journal of Anxiety Disorders is indexed in nine international databases to promote international knowledge translation with inclusion in Elsevier BIOBASE, PubMed/ Medline, PsycINFO, BIOSIS Citation Index, BRS Data, Current Contents – Social & Behavioral Sciences, Pascal Francis, Google Scholar, and Scopus.

== Diversity, equity, and inclusion ==
In August 2021, the Journal of Anxiety Disorders pledged its commitment to improving the diversity of their editorial board and contributors while also making it a priority to increase attention to culture and diversity in the published research. 50% of the senior editors are women and data from January 2021 indicates approximately 30% of the editorial board were women. The journal has made it a priority for 2021–22 to work towards increasing the representation of women on the editorial board with aim of reaching 50% by June 2022.

== Members of Editorial Board ==
- Jonathan S. Abramowitz (University of North Carolina at Chapel Hill), USA
- Ron Acierno (Medical University of South Carolina), USA
- Lynne E. Alden (University of British Columbia), Canada
- Ananda Amstadter (Virginia Commonwealth University), USA
- Courtney Beard (Harvard Medical School), USA
- J. Gayle Beck (University of Memphis), USA
- Eni S. Becker (Radboud University), Netherlands
- Deborah C. Beidel (University of Central Florida), USA
- Julia D. Buckner (Louisiana State University), USA
- L. Levin Chapman (Private Practice, Louisville), USA
- Meredith E. Coles (SUNY *College of Environmental Science and Forestry Department), USA
- Jonathan S. Comer (Florida International University), USA
- Jesse Cougle (Florida State University), USA
- Thompson Davis III (Louisiana State University), USA
- Gretchen Diefenbach (Anxiety Disorders Center), USA
- Laura J. Dixon (University of Mississippi), USA
- Jon D. Elhai (University of Toledo), USA
- Matthew T. Feldner (University of Arkansas), USA
- Robert F. Ferdinand (GGZ Defland), Netherlands
- Thomas A. Fergus (Baylor University), USA
- Brian Fisak (University of North Florida), USA
- Christopher A. Flessner (Kent State University), USA
- Luis Joaquin Garcia-Lopez (University of Jaen), Spain
- Anouk Grubaugh (Medical University of South Carolina), USA
- Heather Hadjistavropoulos (University of Regina), Canada
- Brian Hall (New York University Shanghai), China
- Richard Heimberg (Temple University), USA
- Charmaine Higa-McMillan (University of Hawaii at Hilo), USA
- Stefan Hofmann (Boston University), USA
- Jonathan Huppert (Hebrew University of Jerusalem), Israel
- Dawn M. Johnson (University of Akron), USA
- Christopher A. Kearney (University of Nevada), USA
- Philip C. Kendall (Temple University), USA
- Steven R. Lawyer (Idaho State University), USA
- Carrie Masia-Warner (New York University), USA
- Dean McKay (Fordham University), USA
- Richard J. McNally (Harvard University), USA
- Jan Mohlman (William Paterson University of New Jersey), USA
- Leslie A. Morland (University of California System), USA
- Thomas H. Ollendick (Virginia Polytechnic Institute and State University), USA
- Nnmadi Pole (Smith College), USA
- Sheila Rauch (Emory University School of Medicine), USA
- Thomas L. Rodebaugh (Washington University), USA
- Josef I. Rusek (VA Palo Alto Healthcare System Menlo Park Division), USA
- Norman B. Schmidt (Tallahassee), USA
- Tyler C. Smith (National University School of Health and Human Services), USA
- Eric A. Storch (Baylor College of Medicine), USA
- Charles T. Taylor (University of California San Diego), USA
- Steven Taylor (University of British Columbia), Canada
- Ellen Teng (Baylor College of Medicine), USA
- Matthew T. Tull (University of Toledo), USA
- David Valentiner (Northern Illinois University), USA
- Enrique Varela (Loyala University New Orleans), USA
- Andres G. Viana (University of Houston), USA
- Li Wang (Chinese Academy of Sciences), China
- Carl F. Weems (Iowa State University), USA
- Stephen Whiteside (Mayo Clinic), USA
- Janet Woodruff-Borden (University of Louisville), USA
- Kevin Wu (Northern Illinois University), USA
- Michael J. Zvolensky (University of Houston), USA
