= Anxiety disorder =

Cognitive disorder with an excessive, irrational dread of everyday situations

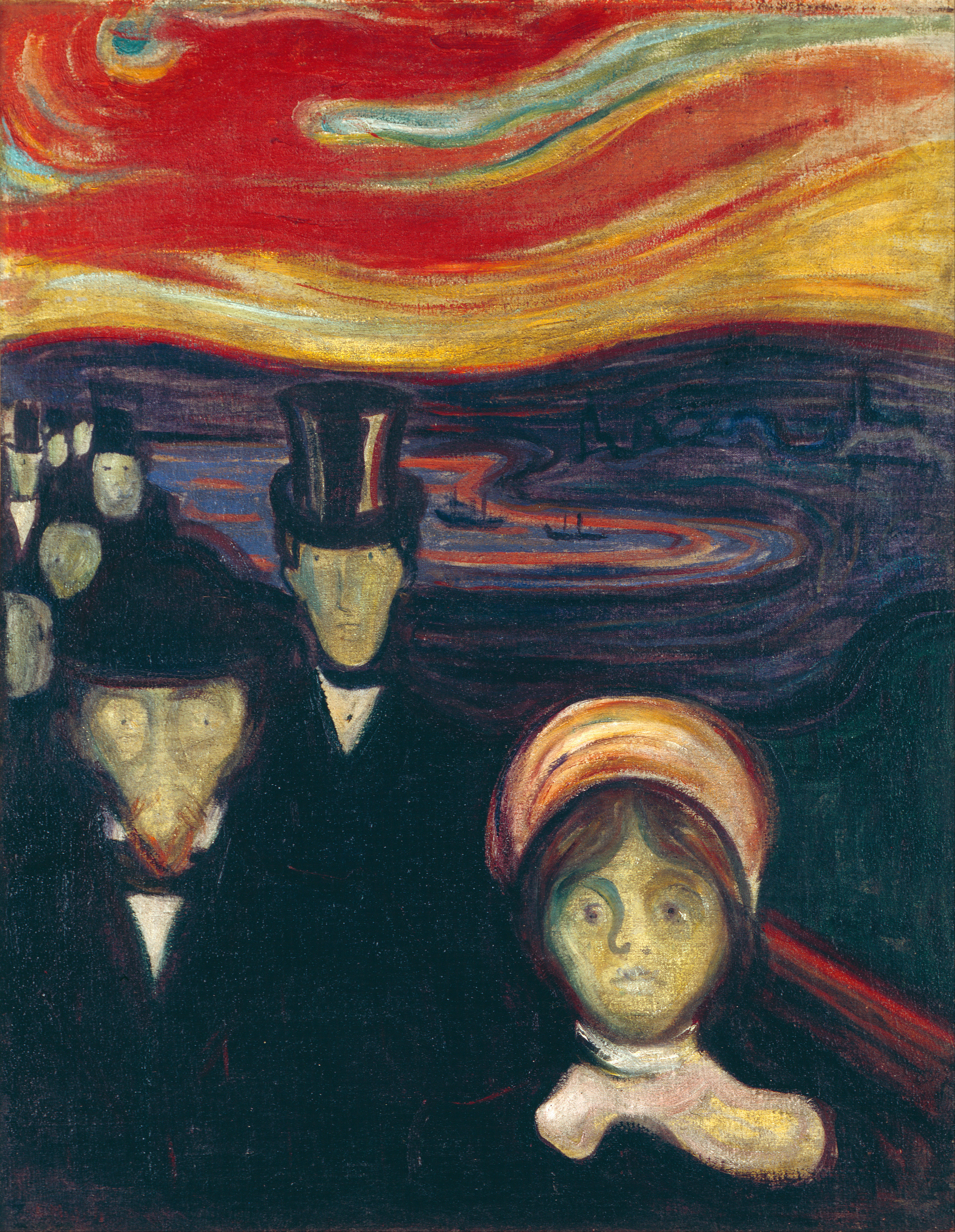
- Anxiety by Edvard Munch
- Specialty: Psychiatry, clinical psychology
- Symptoms: Worrying, fast heart rate, shakiness
- Complications: Depression, trouble sleeping, poor quality of life, substance use disorder, alcohol use disorder, suicide
- Usual onset: 15–35 years old
- Duration: Over 6 months
- Causes: Genetic, environmental, and psychological factors
- Risk factors: Child abuse, family history, poverty
- Diagnostic method: Psychological assessment
- Differential diagnosis: Hyperthyroidism; heart disease; caffeine, alcohol, cannabis use; withdrawal from certain drugs
- Treatment: Lifestyle changes, counselling, medications
- Medication: SSRIs and SNRIs are first line, other options include: tricyclic antidepressants, benzodiazepines, beta blockers
- Frequency: 12% per year

Anxiety disorders are a group of mental disorders characterized by significant and uncontrollable feelings of anxiety and fear such that a person's social, occupational, and personal functions are significantly impaired. Anxiety may cause physical and cognitive symptoms, such as a sense of impending doom, restlessness, irritability, easy fatigue, difficulty concentrating, increased heart rate, chest pain, abdominal pain, and a variety of other symptoms that vary based on the individual.

In casual discourse, the words anxiety and fear are often used interchangeably. In clinical usage, they have distinct meanings; anxiety is clinically defined as an unpleasant emotional state for which the cause is either not readily identified or perceived to be uncontrollable or unavoidable, whereas fear is clinically defined as an emotional and physiological response to a recognized external threat. The umbrella term 'anxiety disorder' refers to a number of specific disorders that include fears (phobias) and/or anxiety symptoms.

There are several types of anxiety disorders, including generalized anxiety disorder, hypochondriasis, specific phobia, social anxiety disorder, separation anxiety disorder, agoraphobia, panic disorder, and selective mutism. Individual disorders can be diagnosed using the specific and unique symptoms, triggering events, and timing. A medical professional must evaluate a person before diagnosing them with an anxiety disorder to ensure that their anxiety cannot be attributed to another medical illness or mental disorder. It is possible for an individual to have more than one anxiety disorder during their life or to have more than one anxiety disorder at the same time. Comorbid mental disorders or substance use disorders are common in those with anxiety. Comorbid depression (lifetime prevalence) is seen in 20–70% of those with social anxiety disorder, 50% of those with panic disorder and 43% of those with general anxiety disorder. The 12 month prevalence of alcohol or substance use disorders in those with anxiety disorders is 16.5%.

Worldwide, anxiety disorders are the second most common type of mental disorders after depressive disorders. Anxiety disorders affect nearly 30% of adults at some point in their lives, with an estimated 5.8% of the global population currently experiencing an anxiety disorder. However, anxiety disorders are treatable, and a number of effective treatments are available. Most people are able to lead normal, productive lives with some form of treatment.

== Classification ==
=== Generalized anxiety disorder ===
Generalized anxiety disorder (GAD) is a common disorder characterized by long-lasting anxiety that is not focused on any one object or situation. Those with generalized anxiety disorder experience non-specific persistent fear and worry and become overly concerned with everyday matters. Generalized anxiety disorder is "characterized by chronic excessive worry accompanied by three or more of the following symptoms: restlessness, fatigue, concentration problems, irritability, muscle tension, and sleep disturbance". Generalized anxiety disorder is the most common anxiety disorder to affect older adults. Anxiety can be a symptom of a medical or substance use disorder problem, and medical professionals must be aware of this. A diagnosis of GAD is made when a person has been excessively worried about an everyday problem for six months or more. These stresses can include family life, work, social life, or their own health. A person may find that they have problems making daily decisions and remembering commitments as a result of a lack of concentration and/or preoccupation with worry. A symptom can be a strained appearance, with increased sweating from the hands, feet, and axillae, along with tearfulness, which can suggest depression. Before a diagnosis of anxiety disorder is made, physicians must rule out drug-induced anxiety and other medical causes.

In children, GAD may be associated with headaches, restlessness, abdominal pain, and heart palpitations. Typically, it begins around eight to nine years of age.

=== Specific phobias ===
The largest category of anxiety disorders is that of specific phobias, which includes all cases in which fear and anxiety are triggered by a specific stimulus or situation. Between 5% and 12% of the population worldwide has specific phobias. According to the National Institute of Mental Health, a phobia is an intense fear of or aversion to specific objects or situations. Individuals with a phobia typically anticipate terrifying consequences from encountering the object of their fear, which can be anything from an animal to a location to a bodily fluid to a particular situation. Common phobias are flying, blood, water, highway driving, and tunnels. When people are exposed to their phobia, they may experience trembling, shortness of breath, or rapid heartbeat. People with specific phobias often go to extreme lengths to avoid encountering their phobia. People with specific phobias understand that their fear is not proportional to the actual potential danger, but they can still become overwhelmed by it.

=== Panic disorder ===
With panic disorder, a person has brief attacks of intense terror and apprehension, often marked by trembling, shaking, confusion, dizziness, or difficulty breathing. These panic attacks are defined by the APA as fear or discomfort that abruptly arises and peaks in less than ten minutes but can last for several hours. Attacks can be triggered by stress, irrational thoughts, general fear, fear of the unknown, or even when engaging in exercise. However, sometimes the trigger is unclear, and attacks can arise without warning. To help prevent an attack, one can avoid the trigger. This can mean avoiding places, people, types of behaviors, or certain situations that have been known to cause a panic attack. This being said, not all attacks can be prevented.

In addition to recurrent and unexpected panic attacks, a diagnosis of panic disorder requires that said attacks have chronic consequences: either worry over the attacks' potential implications, persistent fear of future attacks, or significant changes in behavior related to the attacks. As such, those with panic disorder experience symptoms even outside of specific panic episodes. Often, normal changes in heartbeat are noticed, leading them to think something is wrong with their heart or they are about to have another panic attack. In some cases, a heightened awareness (hypervigilance) of body functioning occurs during panic attacks, wherein any perceived physiological change is interpreted as a possible life-threatening illness (i.e., extreme hypochondriasis).

Panic disorder is commonly comorbid with anxiety due to the consistent fight or flight response that one's brain is being put under at such a high repetitive rate. Another one of the very big leading causes of someone developing a panic disorder has a lot to do with one's childhood. The article provides knowledge on a positive trend in children who experience abuse and have low self-esteem to later on develop disorders such as generalized anxiety disorder and panic disorder.

=== Agoraphobia ===
Agoraphobia is a specific anxiety disorder wherein an individual is afraid of being in a place or situation where escape is difficult or embarrassing or where help may be unavailable. Agoraphobia is strongly linked with panic disorder and is often precipitated by the fear of having a panic attack. A common manifestation involves needing to be in constant view of a door or other escape route. In addition to the fears themselves, the term agoraphobia is often used to refer to avoidance behaviors that individuals often develop. For example, following a panic attack while driving, someone with agoraphobia may develop anxiety over driving and will therefore avoid driving. These avoidance behaviors can have serious consequences and often reinforce the fear they are caused by. In a severe case of agoraphobia, the person may never leave their home.

=== Social anxiety disorder ===
Social anxiety disorder (SAD), also known as social phobia, describes an intense fear and avoidance of negative public scrutiny, public embarrassment, humiliation, or social interaction. This fear can be specific to particular social situations (such as public speaking) or it can be experienced in most or all social situations. Roughly 7% of American adults have social anxiety disorder, and more than 75% of people experience their first symptoms in their childhood or early teenage years. Social anxiety often manifests specific physical symptoms, including blushing, sweating, rapid heart rate, and difficulty speaking. As with all phobic disorders, those with social anxiety often attempt to avoid the source of their anxiety; in the case of social anxiety, this is particularly problematic, and in severe cases, it can lead to complete social isolation.

Children are also affected by social anxiety disorder, although their associated symptoms are different from those of teenagers and adults. They may experience difficulty processing or retrieving information, sleep deprivation, disruptive behaviors in class, and irregular class participation.

Social physique anxiety (SPA) is a sub-type of social anxiety involving concern over the evaluation of one's body by others. SPA is common among adolescents, especially females.

=== Post-traumatic stress disorder ===
Post-traumatic stress disorder (PTSD) was once an anxiety disorder (now moved to trauma- and stressor-related disorders in the DSM-5) that results from a traumatic experience. PTSD affects approximately 3.5% of U.S. adults every year, and an estimated one in eleven people will be diagnosed with PTSD in their lifetime. Post-traumatic stress can result from an extreme situation, such as combat, natural disaster, rape, hostage situations, child abuse, bullying, or even a serious accident. It can also result from long-term (chronic) exposure to a severe stressor— for example, soldiers who endure individual battles but cannot cope with continuous combat. Common symptoms include hypervigilance, flashbacks, avoidant behaviors, anxiety, anger, and depression. In addition, individuals may experience sleep disturbances. People who have PTSD often try to detach themselves from their friends and family and have difficulty maintaining these close relationships. There are a number of treatments that form the basis of the care plan for those with PTSD; such treatments include cognitive behavioral therapy (CBT), prolonged exposure therapy, stress inoculation therapy, medication, psychotherapy, and support from family and friends.

Post-traumatic stress disorder research began with US military veterans of the Vietnam War, as well as natural and non-natural disaster victims. Studies have found the degree of exposure to a disaster to be the best predictor of PTSD.

=== Separation anxiety disorder ===
Separation anxiety disorder (SepAD) is the feeling of excessive and inappropriate levels of anxiety over being separated from a person or place. Separation anxiety is a normal part of development in babies or children, and it is only when this feeling is excessive or inappropriate that it can be considered a disorder. Separation anxiety disorder affects roughly 7% of adults and 4% of children, but childhood cases tend to be more severe; in some instances, even a brief separation can produce panic. Treating a child earlier may prevent problems. This may include training the parents and family on how to deal with it. Often, the parents will reinforce the anxiety because they do not know how to properly work through it with the child. In addition to parent training and family therapy, medication, such as SSRIs, can be used to treat separation anxiety.

=== Selective mutism ===
Selective mutism (SM) is a disorder in which a person who is normally capable of speech does not speak in specific situations or to specific people. Selective mutism usually co-exists with shyness or social anxiety. People with selective mutism stay silent even when the consequences of their silence include shame, social ostracism, or even punishment. Selective mutism affects about 0.8% of people at some point in their lives.

Testing for selective mutism is important because doctors must determine if it is an issue associated with the child's hearing or movements associated with the jaw or tongue and if the child can understand when others are speaking to them. Generally, cognitive behavioral therapy (CBT) is the recommended approach for treating selective mutism, but prospective long-term outcome studies are lacking.

== Causes ==
=== Evolutionary perspectives ===
Evolutionary psychiatry interprets anxiety as part of an evolved defensive system calibrated to potential threat. According to the "smoke-alarm principle," anxiety mechanisms are expected to err on the side of false alarms because the cost of unnecessary fear is typically lower than the cost of failing to detect genuine danger. This framework has been extended to modern settings, where mismatch between ancestral and contemporary threat profiles may contribute to chronic or generalised anxiety.

== Diagnosis ==
The diagnosis of anxiety disorders is made by symptoms, triggers, and an individual's personal and family histories. There are no objective biomarkers or laboratory tests that can diagnose anxiety. It is important for a medical professional to evaluate a person for other medical and mental causes of prolonged anxiety because treatments will vary considerably.

Numerous questionnaires have been developed for clinical use and can be used for an objective scoring system. Symptoms may vary between each sub-type of generalized anxiety disorder. Generally, symptoms must be present for at least six months, occur more days than not, and significantly impair a person's ability to function in daily life. Symptoms may include feeling nervous, anxious, or on edge, worrying excessively, difficulty concentrating, restlessness, and irritability.

Questionnaires developed for clinical use include the State-Trait Anxiety Inventory (STAI), the Generalized Anxiety Disorder 7 (GAD-7), the Beck Anxiety Inventory (BAI), the Zung Self-Rating Anxiety Scale, and the Taylor Manifest Anxiety Scale. Other questionnaires combine anxiety and depression measurements, such as the Hamilton Anxiety Rating Scale, the Hospital Anxiety and Depression Scale (HADS), the Patient Health Questionnaire (PHQ), and the Patient-Reported Outcomes Measurement Information System (PROMIS). Examples of specific anxiety questionnaires include the Liebowitz Social Anxiety Scale (LSAS), the Social Interaction Anxiety Scale (SIAS), the Social Phobia Inventory (SPIN), the Social Phobia Scale (SPS), and the Social Anxiety Questionnaire (SAQ-A30).

The GAD-7 has a sensitivity of 57–94% and a specificity of 82–88% in the diagnosis of general anxiety disorder. All screening questionnaires, if positive, should be followed by clinical interview including assessment of impairment and distress, avoidance behaviors, symptom history and persistence to definitively diagnose an anxiety disorder. Some organizations support routinely screening all adults for anxiety disorders, with the US Preventative Services Task Force recommending screening for all adults younger than 65.

=== Differential diagnosis ===
Anxiety disorders differ from developmentally normal fear or anxiety by being excessive or persisting beyond developmentally appropriate periods. They differ from transient fear or anxiety, often stress-induced, by being persistent (e.g., typically lasting 6 months or more), although the criterion for duration is intended as a general guide with allowance for some degree of flexibility and is sometimes of shorter duration in children.

The diagnosis of an anxiety disorder requires first ruling out an underlying medical cause. Diseases that may present similar to an anxiety disorder include certain endocrine diseases (hypo- and hyperthyroidism, hyperprolactinemia), metabolic disorders (diabetes), deficiency states (low levels of vitamin D, B2, B12, folic acid), gastrointestinal diseases (celiac disease, non-celiac gluten sensitivity, inflammatory bowel disease), heart diseases, blood diseases (anemia), and brain degenerative diseases (Parkinson's disease, dementia, multiple sclerosis, Huntington's disease). Anxiety and panic disorders as well as other neuropsychiatric disorders can be a symptom of mast cell activation syndrome (MCAS).

Several drugs can also cause or worsen anxiety, whether through intoxication, withdrawal, or chronic use. These include alcohol, tobacco, cannabis, sedatives (including prescription benzodiazepines), opioids (including prescription painkillers and illicit drugs like heroin), stimulants (such as caffeine, cocaine, and amphetamines), hallucinogens, and inhalants.

== Prevention ==
Focus is increasing on the prevention of anxiety disorders. There is tentative evidence to support the use of cognitive behavioral therapy and mindfulness therapy. A 2013 review found no effective measures to prevent GAD in adults. A 2017 review found that psychological and educational interventions had a small benefit for the prevention of anxiety. Research indicates that predictors of the emergence of anxiety disorders partly differ from the factors that predict their persistence.

A big factor that goes into anxiety disorder prevention starts in childhood. Based on the cited article, parents have a big part in whether or not their child will develop anxiety in their future. Specific interventions have been tested to educate parents with young children on how to care and prevent a disorder like anxiety from becoming a bigger issue in their child's teen to adult life. The study also shared that since it is such a new intervention that there is not much information on long term results, however it does seem to be looking in a positive direction.

== Treatment ==
Treatment options include psychotherapy, medications and lifestyle changes. Neurofeedback treatment is a form of biofeedback that displays the brainwave activity of a person, usually through an electroencephalogram (EEG), in real time, in order to train the person on how to change his brainwaves.There is no clear evidence as to whether psychotherapy or medication is more effective; the specific medication decision can be made by a doctor and patient with consideration for the patient's specific circumstances and symptoms. If, while on treatment with a chosen medication, the person's anxiety does not improve, another medication may be offered. Specific treatments will vary by sub-type of anxiety disorder, a person's other medical conditions, and medications.

=== Psychological techniques ===
Cognitive behavioral therapy (CBT) is effective for anxiety disorders and is a first-line treatment. CBT is the most widely studied and preferred form of psychotherapy for anxiety disorders. CBT appears to be equally effective when carried out via the internet compared to sessions completed face-to-face. There are specific CBT curriculums or strategies for the specific type of anxiety disorder. CBT has similar effectiveness to pharmacotherapy and in a meta analysis, CBT was associated with medium to large benefit effect sizes for GAD, panic disorder and social anxiety disorder. CBT has low dropout rates and its positive effects have been shown to be maintained at least for 12 months. CBT is sometimes given as once weekly sessions for 8–20 weeks, but regimens vary widely. Booster sessions may need to be restarted for patients who have a relapse of symptoms.

Exposure and response prevention (ERP) has been found effective for treating OCD.

Several meta-analyses indicate that mindfulness-based programs can be effective for managing anxiety disorders across diverse population groups.

A 2015 Cochrane review of Morita therapy for anxiety disorder in adults found insufficient evidence of an effect.

=== Medications ===
First-line choices for medications include SSRIs or SNRIs to treat generalized anxiety disorder, social anxiety disorder or panic disorder. For adults, there is no good evidence supporting which specific medication in the SSRI or SNRI class is best for treating anxiety, so cost often drives drug choice. Fluvoxamine is effective in treating a range of anxiety disorders in children and adolescents. Fluoxetine, sertraline, and paroxetine can also help with some forms of anxiety in children and adolescents. If the chosen medicine is effective, it is recommended that it be continued for at least a year to mitigate the risk of a relapse.

Benzodiazepines are a second line option for the pharmacologic treatment of anxiety. Benzodiazepines are associated with moderate to high effect sizes with regard to symptom relief and they have an onset usually within 1 week. Clonazepam has a longer half life and may possibly be used as once per day dosing. Benzodiazepines may also be used with SNRIs or SSRIs to initially reduce anxiety symptoms, and they may potentially be continued long term. Benzodiazepines are not a first line pharmacologic treatment of anxiety disorders and they carry risks of physical dependence, psychological dependence, overdose death (especially when combined with opioids), misuse, cognitive impairment, falls and motor vehicle crashes.

Buspirone and pregabalin are second-line treatments for people who do not respond to SSRIs or SNRIs. Pregabalin and gabapentin are effective in treating some anxiety disorders, but there is concern regarding their off-label use due to the lack of strong scientific evidence for their efficacy in multiple conditions and their proven side effects.

Medications need to be used with care among older adults, who are more likely to have side effects because of coexisting physical disorders. Adherence problems are more likely among older people, who may have difficulty understanding, seeing, or remembering instructions.

In general, medications are not seen as helpful for specific phobias, but benzodiazepines are sometimes used to help resolve acute episodes. In 2007, data were sparse for the efficacy of any drug.

=== Lifestyle and diet ===
Lifestyle changes include exercise, for which there is moderate evidence for some improvement, regularizing sleep patterns, reducing caffeine intake, and stopping smoking. Stopping smoking has benefits for anxiety as great as or greater than those of medications. A meta-analysis found 2000 mg/day or more of omega-3 polyunsaturated fatty acids, such as fish oil, tended to reduce anxiety in placebo-controlled and uncontrolled studies, particularly in people with more significant symptoms.

=== Cannabis ===
In 2026, a large meta-analysis published in the Lancet showed no effect on anxiety using cannabis. Using cannabis to treat anxiety-related disorders can delay treatment with other, proven methods.

=== Treatments for children ===
Both therapy and a number of medications have been found to be useful for treating childhood anxiety disorders. Therapy is generally preferred to medication.

Cognitive behavioral therapy (CBT) is a good first-line therapy approach. Studies have gathered substantial evidence for treatments that are not CBT-based as effective forms of treatment, expanding treatment options for those who do not respond to CBT. Although studies have demonstrated the effectiveness of CBT for anxiety disorders in children and adolescents, evidence that it is more effective than treatment as usual, medication, or wait list controls is inconclusive. Like adults, children may undergo psychotherapy, cognitive-behavioral therapy, or counseling. Family therapy is a form of treatment in which the child meets with a therapist together with the primary guardians and siblings. Each family member may attend individual therapy, but family therapy is typically a form of group therapy. Art and play therapy are also used. Art therapy is most commonly used when the child will not or cannot verbally communicate due to trauma or a disability in which they are nonverbal. Participating in art activities allows the child to express what they otherwise may not be able to communicate to others. In play therapy, the child is allowed to play however they please as a therapist observes them. The therapist may intercede from time to time with a question, comment, or suggestion. This is often most effective when the family of the child plays a role in the treatment.

== Epidemiology ==
anxiety disorders prevalence

Globally, as of 2010, approximately 273 million (4.5% of the population) had an anxiety disorder. It is more common in females (5.2%) than males (2.8%).

In Europe, Africa, and Asia, lifetime rates of anxiety disorders are between 9 and 16%, and yearly rates are between 4 and 7%. In the United States, the lifetime prevalence of anxiety disorders is about 29%, and between 11 and 18% of adults have the condition in a given year. This difference is affected by the range of ways in which different cultures interpret anxiety symptoms and what they consider to be normative behavior. In general, anxiety disorders represent the most prevalent psychiatric condition in the United States, outside of substance use disorder.

Like adults, children can experience anxiety disorders; between 10 and 20 percent of all children will develop a full-fledged anxiety disorder prior to the age of 18, making anxiety the most common mental health issue in young people. Anxiety disorders in children are often more challenging to identify than their adult counterparts, owing to the difficulty many parents face in discerning them from normal childhood fears. Likewise, anxiety in children is sometimes misdiagnosed as attention deficit hyperactivity disorder, or, due to the tendency of children to interpret their emotions physically (as stomachaches, headaches, etc.), anxiety disorders may initially be confused with physical ailments.

Anxiety in children has a variety of causes; sometimes anxiety is rooted in biology and may be a product of another existing condition, such as autism spectrum disorder. Gifted children are also often more prone to excessive anxiety than non-gifted children. Other cases of anxiety arise from the child having experienced a traumatic event of some kind, and in some cases, the cause of the child's anxiety cannot be pinpointed.

Anxiety in children tends to manifest along age-appropriate themes, such as fear of going to school (not related to bullying) or not performing well enough at school, fear of social rejection, fear of something happening to loved ones, etc. What separates disordered anxiety from normal childhood anxiety is the duration and intensity of the fears involved.

According to a 2011 study, people who rank highly in hypercompetitive traits are at increased risk of both anxiety and depression.

== Society and culture ==
=== Stigma ===
People with an anxiety disorder may be challenged by prejudices and stereotypes held by other people, most likely as a result of misconceptions around anxiety and anxiety disorders. Misconceptions found in a data analysis from the National Survey of Mental Health Literacy and Stigma include: (1) many people believe anxiety is not a real medical illness; and (2) many people believe that people with anxiety could turn it off if they wanted to. For people experiencing the physical and mental symptoms of an anxiety disorder, stigma and negative social perception can make an individual less likely to seek treatment.

Prejudice that some people with mental illness turn against themselves is called self-stigma.

There is no explicit evidence for the exact cause of stigma towards anxiety. Stigma can be divided by social scale, into the macro, intermediate, and micro levels. The macro-level marks society as a whole with the influence of mass media. The intermediate level includes healthcare professionals and their perspectives. The micro-level details the individual's contributions to the process through self-stigmatization.

60% of college students meet the criteria for at least one mental disorder. Anxiety has grown in prevalence over time, due to social pressures, school and career worries, etc. This has affected the quality of life of youth. Negative stigma around the issue is becoming less pronounced, but efforts to reduce it are still under way.

Stigma can be described in three conceptual ways: cognitive, emotional, and behavioral. This allows for differentiation between stereotypes, prejudice, and discrimination.

== See also ==
- Exposure therapy
- List of investigational anxiety disorder drugs
- Mixed anxiety–depressive disorder
- Symptoms of victimization
