= Specific social phobia =

Experiencing anxiety only in specific social situations

Mental health professionals often distinguish between generalized social phobia and specific social phobia. People with generalized social phobia have great distress in a wide range of social situations. Those with specific social phobia may experience anxiety only in a few situations. The term "specific social phobia" may also refer to specific forms of non-clinical social anxiety.

The most common specific social phobia are glossophobia (the fear of public speaking) and stage fright (the fear of performance). Others include fears of intimacy or sexual encounters, using public restrooms (paruresis), attending social gatherings, using telephones, and dealing with authority figures.

Specific social phobia may be classified into performance fears and interaction fears, i.e., fears of acting in a social setting and interacting with other people, respectively. The cause of social phobia is not definite.

Symptoms of social phobia can occur in late adolescence when youths highly value the impressions they give off to their peers. Clinical experience of the prognosis of social phobia shows that it can prolong for many years but that it improves by mid life.

== Treatment ==
Treatment of social phobia usually involves psychotherapy, medication, or both.

=== Psychotherapy ===
Cognitive behavioral therapy (CBT) is commonly used to treat social phobia. CBT uses various techniques in order to improve the individual (diagnosed with social phobia), ways of thinking, behaving and coping in social situations that lead the individual to distress. CBT aims to make improvement in the individual's distress, fear, and anxiety through a social focus and environment. CBT is typically done through individual sessions, but group sessions have been completed through CBT.

=== Medication ===
Anti-anxiety and antidepressant medication is commonly prescribed for treatment of social anxiety disorder. Selective serotonin reuptake inhibitors (SSRIs) such as sertraline, fluvoxamine, and paroxetine are common anti depressants used for treatment of social anxiety disorder. Studies show that these SSRI's do have positive effects in comparison to placebo trials, however not all individuals were effected in the same magnitude or found similar comfort. These SSRI's have improved results after 12 weeks of use, when compared to the placebo. The MAOI Nardil (phenelzine sulfate) works extremely well in treating social phobia and is often referred to as the "gold standard" for social phobia due to its unique mechanism on increasing GABA.

Patients who have avoided certain situations should make a big effort to become exposed to these situations while at the same time taking antidepressant medication. Anxiolytic medication aids a patient to handle social or professional situations before more lasting treatment has had an effect and therefore it is a provider of short term relief, but anxiolytics have a risk of dependence. Beta-adrenergic antagonists help to control palpitations and tremors unresponsive to the treatment of anxiolytic medication.

== Prevalence ==
In the past, when the prevalence was estimated by sampling the psychiatric clinical cases, social phobia was thought to be a rare disorder. It is now recognized that this way of estimating is inappropriate, because people with social phobia rarely seek psychiatric help by the very nature of their disorder. A more reliable source used now is community surveys.

Various surveys show that the syndrome of glossophobia is the most prevalent type. An article based on a National Comorbidity Survey reported that 1/3 of people with lifetime social phobia had glossophobia Another survey of a community sample from a Canadian city reported that of people who believed being anxious in one or several social situations 55% feared speaking to a large audience, 25% feared speaking to a small group of familiar people, 23% feared dealing with authority, 14.5% feared social gatherings, 14% feared speaking to strangers, 7% feared eating and 5% feared writing in public.

== See also ==
- Specific phobia
