= Social anxiety =

Discomfort or fear in social settings

Social anxiety is the anxiety and fear specifically linked to being in social settings (i.e., interacting with others). Some categories of disorders associated with social anxiety include anxiety disorders, mood disorders, autism spectrum disorders, eating disorders, and substance use disorders. Individuals with higher levels of social anxiety often avert their gazes, show fewer facial expressions, and show difficulty with initiating and maintaining a conversation. The tendency for individuals with high social anxiety to avert their attention toward neutral stimuli is termed attention bias. Social anxiety commonly manifests itself in the teenage years and can be persistent throughout life; however, people who experience problems in their daily functioning for an extended period of time may develop social anxiety disorder. Trait social anxiety, the stable tendency to experience this anxiety, can be distinguished from state anxiety, the momentary response to a particular social stimulus. Half of the individuals with any social fears meet the criteria for social anxiety disorder. Age, culture, and gender impact the severity of this disorder. The function of social anxiety is to increase arousal and attention to social interactions, inhibit unwanted social behavior, and motivate preparation for future social situations. Social anxiety can be observed by both physiological and cognitive symptoms. Cognitive symptoms that arise from social anxiety can impair quality of life, interpersonal relationships and satisfaction in social life.

== Disorder ==
Social anxiety disorder (SAD), also known as social phobia, is an anxiety disorder characterized by a significant amount of fear in one or more social situations causing considerable distress and impaired ability to function in at least some parts of daily life. These fears can be triggered by perceived or actual scrutiny from others. Social anxiety disorder affects 8% of women and 6.1% of men. In the United States, anxiety disorders are the most common mental illness, affecting 40 million adults. Anxiety can come in different forms. Panic attacks can lead to panic disorders, the recurrence of unexpected panic attacks. Other related anxiety disorders include social anxiety disorder, generalized anxiety disorder, obsessive compulsive disorder (OCD), various types of phobias, and post traumatic stress disorder (PTSD). Social anxiety is treatable, though not everyone requires treatment.

Physical symptoms often include excessive blushing, excess sweating, trembling, palpitations, and nausea. Stammering may be present, along with rapid speech. Panic attacks can also occur under intense fear and discomfort. Some sufferers may use alcohol or other drugs to reduce fears and inhibitions at social events. It is common for sufferers of social phobia to self-medicate, especially if they are undiagnosed or untreated. This can lead to alcoholism, eating disorders or other kinds of substance abuse. SAD is sometimes referred to as an "illness of lost opportunities" where "individuals make major life choices to accommodate their illness". According to ICD-10 guidelines, the main diagnostic criteria of social anxiety disorder are fear of being the focus of attention, or fear of behaving in a way that will be embarrassing or humiliating, often coupled with avoidance and anxiety symptoms. Standardized rating scales can be used to screen for social anxiety disorder and measure the severity of anxiety.

== Stages ==
=== Child development ===
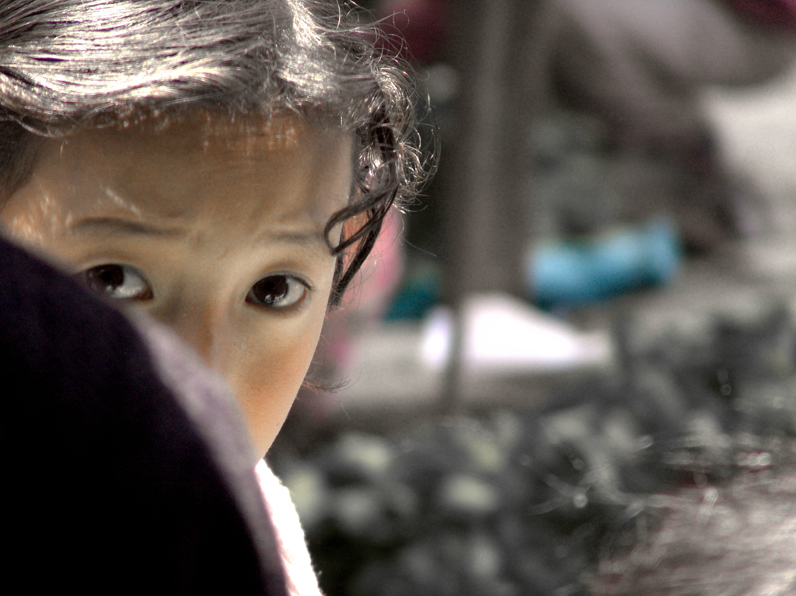
Shyness is distinct from social anxiety, but shyness in children can develop into anxiety if social-avoidance tendencies are not outgrown.

Some feelings of anxiety in social situations are normal and necessary for effective social functioning and developmental growth. The difficulty with identifying social anxiety disorder in children lies in determining the difference between social anxiety and basic shyness. Typically, children may be diagnosed when their social fears are extreme or cannot be outgrown. Cognitive advances and increased pressures in late childhood and early adolescence result in repeated social anxiety. More and more children are being diagnosed with social anxiety, and this can lead to problems with education if not closely monitored. Part of social anxiety is fear of being criticized by others. In children, social anxiety causes extreme distress over everyday activities such as playing with other kids, reading in class, or speaking to adults. Some children with social anxiety may act out because of their fear, or they may exhibit nervousness or cry in the event they feel anxious.

=== Adolescence ===
Adolescents have identified that their most common anxieties are connected to their relationships with peers they are attracted to, peer rejection, public speaking, blushing, self-consciousness, panic, and past behavior. Most adolescents progress through their fears and meet the developmental demands placed on them. Adolescents who continue to struggle with social anxiety tend to be more withdrawn, and have decreased feelings of being accepted by their peers. Adolescents who continually withdraw and disengage from social relations tend to experience increased peer victimization and decreased peer acceptance, which can increase the social anxiety they are experiencing.

=== Adulthood ===
It can be easier to identify social anxiety within adults because they tend to shy away from any social situation and keep to themselves. Common adult forms of social anxiety include performance anxiety, public speaking anxiety, stage fright, and timidness. All of these may also assume clinical forms, i.e., become anxiety disorders (see below).

Criteria that distinguish between clinical and nonclinical forms of social anxiety include the intensity and level of behavioral and psychosomatic disruption in addition to the anticipatory nature of the fear. Social anxieties may also be classified according to the broadness of triggering social situations. For example, fear of eating in public has a very narrow situational scope, while shyness may have a wide scope with a person being anxious in a variety of different situations. Clinical forms are divided into general social phobia (i.e., social anxiety disorder) and specific social phobia.

== Signs and symptoms ==
=== Physiological symptoms ===
Blushing is a physiological response unique to humans and is a hallmark physiological response associated with social anxiety. Blushing is the involuntary reddening of the face, neck, and chest in reaction to evaluation or social attention. Blushing occurs not only in response to feelings of embarrassment but also other socially-oriented emotions such as shame, guilt, shyness, and pride. Individuals high in social anxiety perceive themselves as blushing more than those who are low in social anxiety. Three types of blushing can be measured: self-perceived blushing (how much the individual believes they are blushing), physiological blushing (blushing as measured by physiological indices), and observed blushing (blushing observed by others). Social anxiety is strongly associated with self-perceived blushing, moderately associated with observed blushing, and weakly associated with blushing as measured by physiological indices such as temperature and blood flow to the cheeks and forehead. The relationship between physiological blushing and self-perceived blushing is small among those high in social anxiety, indicating that individuals with high social anxiety may overestimate their blushing. Social anxiety being associated most strongly with self-perceived blushing is also important for cognitive models of blushing and social anxiety, indicating that socially anxious individuals use both internal cues and other types of information to draw conclusions about how they are coming across.

Individuals with social anxiety might also refrain from making eye contact, or constantly fidget during conversations or public speaking. Other indicators are sudden physical symptoms including rapid heartbeat, muscle tension, dizziness and/or lightheadedness, stomach issues, diarrhea, trouble breathing, or “out of body” sensations.

=== Cognitive symptoms ===
People with social anxiety disorder typically feel quite uncomfortable when they might be judged or watched by others. They may be afraid of making mistakes or being embarrassed, even when they are just talking to strangers or being in a group. These worries can make people feel anxious all the time and make them expect bad things to happen before they happen. This kind of thinking may lead to more avoidance behaviors over time and make it harder to interact with others in social, academic or work settings.

Individuals with social anxiety have a heightened level of internalizing symptoms such as trait anxiety, depression and self conscious behavior. The emotional and mental results of these cognitive symptoms include a lesser satistion in social life and bigger interpersonal problems. People who are prone to higher levels of social anxiety tend to suffer in many cognitive aspects such as lacking cognitive resources, maintaining tasks, distraction and lowered inhibition.

== Attention bias ==
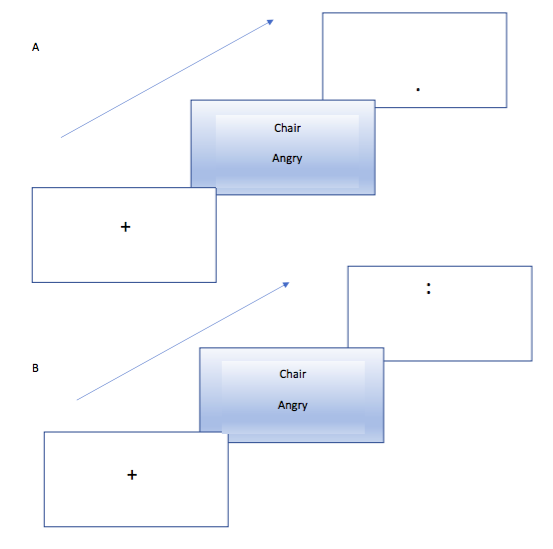
Dot-Probe Paradigm Example

Individuals who tend to experience more social anxiety turn their attention away from threatening social information and toward themselves, prohibiting themselves from challenging negative expectations about others while maintaining those high levels of social anxiety. For example, a socially anxious individual may perceive rejection from a conversational partner, turn their attention away, and never learn that the individual is actually welcoming. Individuals who are high in social anxiety tend to show increased initial attention toward negative social cues, such as threatening faces, followed by attention away from these social cues, indicating a pattern of hypervigilance followed by avoidance. Research also suggests that individuals who have high levels of social anxiety often divert their attention to neutral stimuli to avoid eye contact and threatening communication. There is a positive correlation between social anxiety and attentional bias toward neutral stimuli as a distraction mechanism. Some claim that long-term memory for the distractor stimuli is enhanced because of involuntary attention bias.

Attention in social anxiety has been measured using the dot-probe paradigm, which presents two faces next to one another. One face has an emotional expression and the other has a neutral expression, and when the faces disappear, a probe appears in the location of one of the faces. This creates a congruent condition in which the probe appears in the same location as the emotional face and an incongruent condition. Participants respond to the probe by pressing a button and differences in reaction times reveal attentional biases. This task has produced mixed results, with some studies finding no differences between socially-anxious individuals and controls, some studies finding avoidance of all faces by socially-anxious individuals, and other studies finding vigilance by socially-anxious individuals only toward threat faces. The Face-in-the-crowd task shows that individuals with social anxiety are faster at detecting an angry face in a predominantly neutral or positive crowd or slower at detecting happy faces than a non-anxious person.

Focus on the self has been associated with increased social anxiety and negative affect. However, there are two types of self-focus: public and private. In public self-focus, one shows concern for the impact of one's own actions on others and their impressions. This type of self-focus predicts greater social anxiety. Other more private forms of self-consciousness (e.g., egocentric goals) are associated with other types of negative affect. Individuals with internalizing features (e.g., depression and anxiety) are often those with higher levels of self-conscious behavior and tend to exhibit higher social anxiety levels.

Scientific research suggests that cognitive biases can be modified. Attention bias modification training has been shown to temporarily impact social anxiety. Research also highlights the fact that high social anxiety is reduced by reactive control rather than proactive control.

== Triggers and behaviors ==
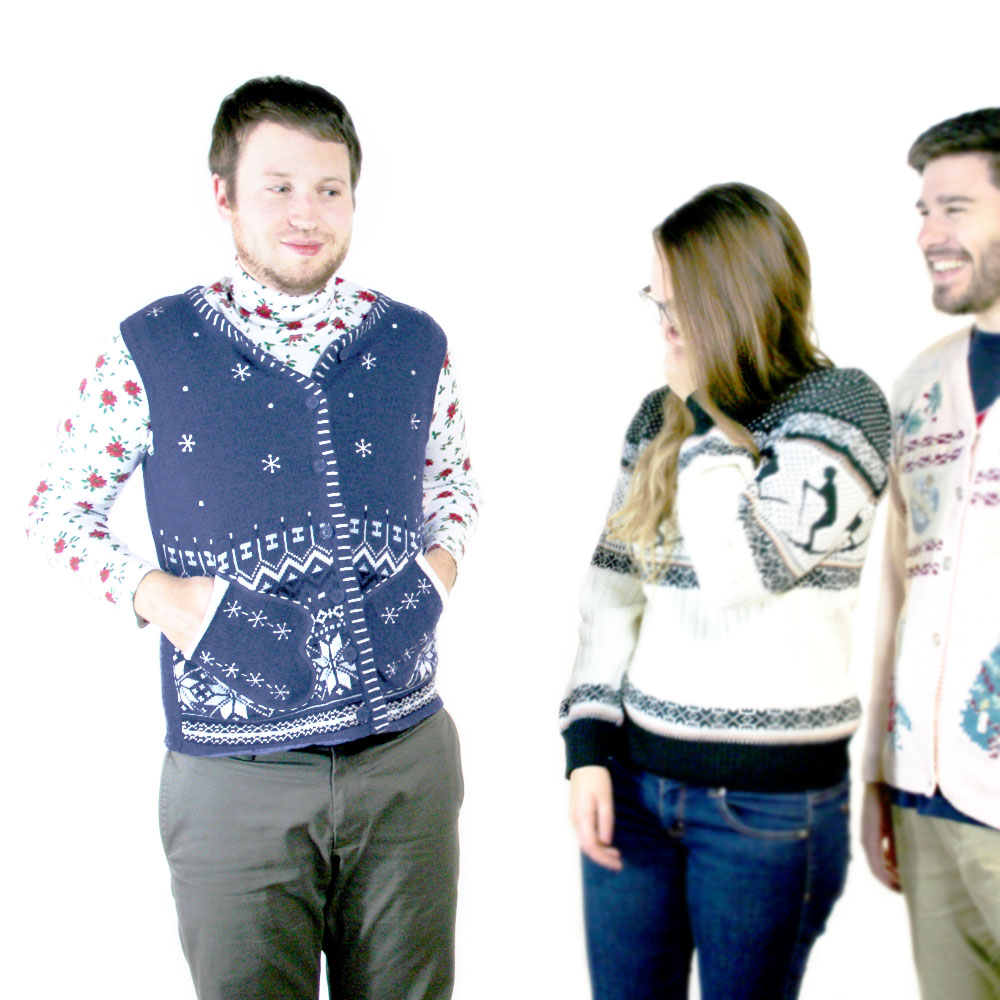
Social situations such as parties may be triggers for social anxiety. A safety behavior in response to such a situation may be hiding one's hands.

Triggers are events or situations that remind someone of a previous negative trauma or feared outcome. Exposure to a trigger could lead a person to have an emotional or physical reaction. Individuals could also have behavioral changes, such as avoiding public places or situations that might direct excessive focus and attention toward them, such as public speaking or talking to new people. They also may not participate in certain activities for fear of embarrassment, which can lead to isolation. For someone with social anxiety, experiencing an embarrassing moment could result in a panic attack.

There are many negative side effects that can come from social anxiety if untreated, including low self-esteem, trouble being assertive, hypersensitivity to criticism, poor social skills, becoming isolated, having difficulties with social relationships, low academic or employment performance, substance abuse, and suicidal thoughts or attempts. Safety behaviors often involve avoidance of the trigger itself or of perceived threats when exposed to the trigger. For example, once in a feared social situation, a socially-anxious individual may avoid eye contact, speaking to strangers, or eating in front of others. Safety behaviors meant to make an individual feel safer have been found to most often enforce or validate anxious feelings, thus leading to a cycle in which the safety behavior is thought to be needed and the trigger's perceived threat is never challenged.

== Measures and treatment ==
Trait social anxiety is most commonly measured by self-report. This method possesses limitations, but subjective responses are the most reliable indicator of a subjective state. Other measures of social anxiety include diagnostic interviews, clinician-administered instruments, and behavioral assessments. Researchers also observe participants levels of social anxiety by natural observation of the participants communication skills. No single trait social anxiety self-report measure shows all psychometric properties, including different kinds of validity (content validity, criterion validity, construct validity), reliability, and internal consistency. The SIAS along with the SIAS-6A and -6B are rated as the best scales of measurement for social anxiety. These measures include:

=== Assessment tools ===
- Fear of Negative Evaluation (FNE) and Brief form (BFNE)
- Fear Questionnaire Social Phobic Subscale (FQSP)
- Interaction Anxiousness Scale (IAS)
- Liebowitz Social Anxiety Scale—Self Report (LSAS-SR)
- Older Adult Social-Evaluative Situations (OASES)
- Social Avoidance and Distress (SAD)
- Self-Consciousness Scale (SCS)
- Social Interaction Anxiety Scale (SIAS) and brief form (SIAS-6A and -6B)
- Social Interaction Phobia Scale (SIPS)
- Social Phobia and Anxiety Inventory (SPAI) and brief form (SPAI-23)
- Situational Social Avoidance (SSA)

Researchers study processes involved in aversive and avoidance learning in social anxiety to determine the biases amongst different contexts. Methods involve analyzing neurocomputational abilities by means of EEG activities, highlighting many avenues towards adaptive learning for individuals suffering from social anxiety, with a specific emphasis on frontal midline theta (FM-theta) as a target for neurological intervention methods.

Many types of treatments are available for Social Anxiety Disorder (SAD). The disorder can more effectively be treated if identified early, such as in the early teenage years when SAD onset usually occurs. Treatment is made more effective by considering individual patients’ backgrounds and needs and often by combining behavioral and pharmacological interventions. The first-line treatment for social anxiety disorder is cognitive behavioral therapy (CBT), with medications recommended only in those who are not interested in therapy or who need medication in conjunction with talk therapy. CBT is effective in treating social phobia, whether delivered individually or in a group setting. The cognitive and behavioral components seek to change thought patterns and physical reactions to anxiety-inducing situations. The cognitive part of CBT helps individuals with social anxiety challenge unhelpful thoughts and allow new patterns of positive thinking or logical reasoning. The behavioral component involves taking action to challenge the identified negative thoughts, such as participating in an anxiety-inducing activity that isn't dangerous in reality. Challenging behaviors in this way is part of exposure therapy. Recent research indicates that online modalities of cognitive behavioral therapy may effectively alleviate symptoms of social anxiety. People can get therapy online in a more familiar setting, which may help them feel less scared about talking to someone in person. Studies show that digital interventions may help people stop avoiding situations and feel more confident in social settings.

The attention given to social anxiety disorder has significantly increased since 1999 with the approval and marketing of drugs for its treatment. Prescribed medications include several classes of antidepressants: selective serotonin reuptake inhibitors (SSRIs), serotonin-norepinephrine reuptake inhibitors (SNRIs), and monoamine oxidase inhibitors (MAOIs). Other commonly used medications include beta blockers and benzodiazepines. SAD is the most common anxiety disorder, with up to 10% of people being affected at some point in their life. Other treatments that individuals with social anxiety may find helpful include massages, meditation, mindfulness, hypnotherapy, and acupuncture.

== Development and evolutionary theories ==
=== Social development in childhood ===
Fearful temperament, underdeveloped social skills, or excessive socialization cause a child to become hyper-aware of inappropriate or threatening social situations. Additional factors in upbringing which can increase the likelihood of a child to develop social anxiety include overprotection by parents, lack of an emotionally expressive home environment, and observation of other people's social fears or mistakes. Once a child reaches adolescent years, decreased peer acceptance correlates with increased social anxiety, which contributes to the adolescent withdrawing further.

=== Sensory processing sensitivity ===
Sensory processing sensitivity (SPS) is a temperamental or personality trait involving "an increased sensitivity of the central nervous system and a deeper cognitive processing of physical, social and emotional stimuli". The trait is characterized by "a tendency to 'pause to check' in novel situations, greater sensitivity to subtle stimuli, and the engagement of deeper cognitive processing strategies for employing coping actions, all of which is driven by heightened emotional reactivity, both positive and negative". Genetic inheritance of a high level of sensory processing sensitivity may increase an individual's awareness of social situations and their potential consequences.

=== Biological adaptation to living in small groups ===
There is a suggestion that people have adapted to live with others in small groups. Living in a group is attractive to humans as there are more people to provide labor and protection, and there is a concentration of potential mates. Any perceived threat to group resources should leave an individual on guard, as should any potential position of status that might bring conflict with others. In effect, anxiety is adaptive because it helps people understand what is socially acceptable and what is not. The threat of exclusion from resources could lead to death.

Much of evolutionary theory is concerned with reproduction, so exposure to potential mates within a group is an evolutionary benefit. Finally, at a basic level, being confined to a particular group of people limits exposure to certain diseases. Studies have suggested that social affiliation has an impact on health, and, the more integrated and accepted we are, the healthier we are. All of these factors are evolutionary primers for humans to be sensitive to social situations and their potential consequences.

=== Exclusion theory ===
At its simplest, social anxiety might come from as a basic human need to 'fit into' a given social group. Someone might be excluded due to their inability to contribute to a group, deviance from group standards, or even unattractiveness. Due to the benefits of living in a group, an individual would want to avoid social isolation at any cost. Knowing what is and is not seen as attractive to others allows individuals to anticipate and prevent rejection, criticisms, or exclusion by others. Humans are physiologically sensitive to social cues and therefore detect changes in interactions which may indicate dissatisfaction or unpleasant reactions. Overall, social anxiety may serve as a way for people to avoid certain actions that might bring anticipated social exclusion.

== Cultural influence ==
Social anxiety does vary from culture to culture, specifically between collectivistic and individualistic societies. Collectivism focuses on the relationships between people as a group and strives for societal interdependence; harmony within a group takes priority over individual needs, and personal achievements are viewed as less important than benefiting the group as a whole. Individualistic cultures place more value on the independence and success of an individual, where people are rewarded and admired for their own accomplishments. These cultural differences often affect the way people behave. In individualistic cultures, behavior is influenced by one's own thoughts and feelings. In collectivist cultures, behavior is more inspired by societal expectations, roles, and the desire to nourish group harmony.

One distinctive example of how social anxiety may appear in a collectivistic culture is taijin kyofusho (TKS), a condition most prominent in Japanese and Korean cultures. As with social anxiety disorder (SAD), people with TKS fear being judged, often avoiding social situations. The difference is what is feared. Individuals with SAD tend to worry about embarrassing only themselves, while those with TKS are more concerned about offending or creating an uncomfortable environment for others.

== See also ==
- Alexithymia
- Agoraphobia
- Asociality
- Bullying
- Autism spectrum (Asperger syndrome, Autism)
- Avoidant personality disorder
- Competition
- Emotional labor
- Emotion work
- Evaluation
- Harassment
- Highly sensitive person
- Identity performance
- Major depressive disorder
- Obsessive-compulsive disorder
- Peer pressure
- Productivism
- Rat race
- Schizoid personality disorder
- Selective mutism
- Shame
- Social competition
  - Keeping up with the Joneses
- Social determinants of health
- Social determinants of health in poverty
- Social determinants of mental health
- Social inhibition
- Social isolation
- Social rejection
- Social stress
- Toxic workplace
- Workplace harassment
