= Money Sharma =

- Born: 22 July 1986 (age 39); Lucknow
- Occupation: Photographer
- Website: www.moneysharma.com

Money Sharma is a photographer, photojournalist and journalist from Mumbai, India and his images have appeared in National Geographic, The Scotsman, Daily News (New York), Mail Online, The Huffington Post, The Washington Post, Hindustan Times and several other national and international publications.

== Early life and career ==
Money Sharma was born in Lucknow and brought up in Varanasi, till he completed his schooling at Ramnagar, Varanasi. Money later moved to New Delhi and graduated in Mass Communication. He started his career in New Delhi in the year 2005 and later moved on to Mumbai in 2006 to work as a journalist. Later, he joined Bollywood Hungama as an assistant editor. In 2011, he left journalism to pursue his interest in photography as a full-time profession. That same year, he won National Geographic Channel India's Nat Geo Moment Awards III title. During his photography career, he has had a learning association with World Press Photo winner and Pulitzer Prize nominated photojournalist Arko Datta and experienced photographer Steve Winter.

== Awards ==
He got National Geographic Channel India's Nat Geo Moment Awards III in the year 2011 and the prize winning photograph was taken on 10 November 2010 during Ganga Aarti (worshipping the river Ganges) at Dashashwamedh Ghat in Varanasi. Steve Winter, who was the judge, opinioned that the prize winning photograph "... is a classic composition."
