= Social anxiety disorder =

Anxiety disorder associated with social situations

- Other names: Social phobia
- Specialty: Psychiatry, clinical psychology
- Symptoms: Social isolation, hypervigilance, self-consciousness
- Usual onset: Typically during childhood or adolescence
- Risk factors: Genetic factors, preexisting mental disorder
- Treatment: Psychotherapy, medication
- Medication: SSRIs, venlafaxine, phenelzine, propranolol (for performance anxiety)
- Frequency: 7% (2003) to 36% (2020)

Social anxiety disorder is distinct from the personality traits of introversion and shyness.

Social anxiety disorder (SAD), previously known as social phobia, is an anxiety disorder characterized by high levels of anxiety and self-consciousness in social situations, resulting in significant distress and an impaired ability to function in daily life. The defining feature of social anxiety disorder is a persistent fear of negative or positive evaluation by others. These fears can be triggered by perceived or actual scrutiny from others. Recent data suggest the prevalence of social anxiety disorder is rising, particularly among young people.

Physical symptoms often include excessive blushing, excessive sweating, trembling, palpitations, muscle tension, shortness of breath, and nausea. Panic attacks can also occur under intense fear and discomfort. Some affected individuals may use alcohol or other drugs to reduce fears and inhibitions at social events. It is common for socially anxious individuals to self-medicate in this fashion, especially if they are undiagnosed, undertreated or untreated. This results in a heightened risk of alcohol use disorder, eating disorders, or other substance use disorders among sufferers. According to ICD-11 guidelines, an individual meets the criteria for social anxiety disorder if they experience persistent symptoms for at least several months, resulting in significant distress and impairment in personal, family, social, educational, occupational, or other important areas of functioning.

The first line of treatment for social anxiety disorder is cognitive behavioral therapy (CBT) with or without medication. CBT is most effective when delivered individually, though it can be offered in a group format. The cognitive and behavioral components seek to change thought patterns and physical reactions to anxiety-inducing situations. Metacognitive therapy and acceptance and commitment therapy are alternative options with efficacy at least as high as CBT.

The attention given to social anxiety disorder has significantly increased since 1999, with the approval and marketing of drugs for its treatment. Approved medications include the selective serotonin reuptake inhibitors (SSRIs) paroxetine, sertraline, and fluvoxamine, the serotonin–norepinephrine reuptake inhibitor (SNRI) venlafaxine, and the monoamine oxidase inhibitor (MAOI) phenelzine. Propranolol, a beta blocker, is sometimes used off-label for performance anxiety.

== Signs and symptoms ==
The 11th revision of the International Classification of Diseases (ICD-11) classifies social anxiety disorder as an anxiety or fear-related disorder.

=== Cognitive aspects ===
In cognitive models of social anxiety disorder, those with social anxiety disorder experience dread over how they will present to others. They may feel overly self-conscious, pay excessive attention to themselves, or have high performance standards for themselves. According to the social psychology theory of self-presentation, an affected person attempts to create a well-mannered impression towards others but believes they are unable to do so. Many times, before the potentially anxiety-provoking social situation, they may deliberately review what could go wrong and how to deal with each unexpected case. After the event, they may have the perception that they performed unsatisfactorily. Consequently, they will perceive anything that may have possibly been abnormal as embarrassing. These thoughts may extend for weeks or longer. Cognitive distortions are a hallmark and are learned about in CBT (cognitive-behavioral therapy). Thoughts are often self-defeating and inaccurate. Those with social phobia tend to interpret neutral or ambiguous conversations with a negative outlook and many studies suggest that socially anxious individuals remember more negative memories than those less distressed.

=== Behavioral aspects ===
Social anxiety disorder is a persistent fear of one or more situations in which the person is exposed to possible scrutiny by others and fears that they may do something or act in a way that will be humiliating or embarrassing. It exceeds normal "shyness" as it leads to excessive social avoidance and substantial social or occupational impairment.

Those who have social anxiety disorder fear being judged by others in society. In particular, individuals with social anxiety are nervous in the presence of people with authority and feel uncomfortable during physical examinations. People who have this disorder may behave a certain way or say something and then feel embarrassed or humiliated after. As a result, they often choose to isolate themselves from society to avoid such situations. They may also feel uncomfortable meeting people they do not know and act distant when they are with large groups of people. In some cases, they may show evidence of this disorder by avoiding eye contact, or blushing when someone is talking to them.

=== Physiological aspects ===
Physiological effects may include excessive sweating, nausea, difficulty breathing, shaking, palpitations, and increased heart rate.

=== Social aspects ===
People with SAD avoid situations that most people consider normal. People with SAD avoid all or most social situations and hide from others, which can affect their personal relationships. Social phobia can completely remove people from social situations due to the irrational fear of these situations. People with SAD may be addicted to social media networks, have sleep deprivation, and feel good when they avoid human interactions. SAD can also lead to low self-esteem, negative thoughts, major depressive disorder, sensitivity to criticism, and poor social skills that do not improve. People with SAD experience anxiety in a variety of social situations, from important, meaningful encounters to common situations. These people may feel more nervous in job interviews, dates, interactions with authority, or at work and school.

=== Comorbidity ===
SAD shows a high degree of co-occurrence with psychiatric disorders. In fact, a population-based study found that 66% of those with SAD had one or more additional mental health disorders. SAD often occurs alongside low self-esteem and most commonly clinical depression. Clinical depression is 1.49 to 3.5 times more likely to occur in those with SAD. Research also indicates that the presence of certain social fears (e.g., avoidance of participating in small groups, avoidance of going to a party) are more likely to trigger comorbid depressive symptoms than other social fears.

Anxiety disorders other than SAD are also common in people with SAD, in particular generalized anxiety disorder. Avoidant personality disorder is likewise highly correlated with SAD, with comorbidity rates ranging from 25% to 89%.

To try to reduce their anxiety and alleviate depression, people with social phobia may use alcohol or other drugs, which can lead to substance use disorders. It is estimated that one-fifth of people with social anxiety disorder also have alcohol use disorder. However, some research suggests SAD is unrelated to, or even protective against alcohol-related problems. Those who have both alcohol use disorder and social anxiety disorder are more likely to avoid group-based treatments and to relapse compared to people who do not have this combination.

== Causes ==
Research into the causes of social anxiety and social phobia is wide-ranging, encompassing multiple perspectives from neuroscience to sociology. Scientists have yet to pinpoint the exact causes. Studies suggest that genetics can play a part in combination with environmental factors. Social phobia is not caused by other mental disorders or substance use. Generally, social anxiety begins at a specific point in an individual's life. This will develop over time as the person struggles to recover. Eventually, mild social awkwardness can develop into symptoms of social anxiety or phobia. Passive social media usage may cause social anxiety in some people.

=== Genetics ===
It has been shown that there is a two to a threefold greater risk of having social phobia if a first-degree relative also has the disorder. This could be due to genetics and/or due to children acquiring social fears and avoidance through processes of observational learning or parental psychosocial education. Studies of identical twins brought up (via adoption) in different families have indicated that, if one twin developed social anxiety disorder, then the other was between 30 percent and 50 percent more likely than average to also develop the disorder. To some extent, this "heritability" may not be specific – for example, studies have found that if a parent has any kind of anxiety disorder or clinical depression, then a child is somewhat more likely to develop an anxiety disorder or social phobia. Studies suggest that parents of those with social anxiety disorder tend to be more socially isolated themselves, and shyness in adoptive parents is significantly correlated with shyness in adopted children.

Growing up with overprotective and hypercritical parents has also been associated with social anxiety disorder. Adolescents who were rated as having an insecure (anxious-ambivalent) attachment with their mother as infants were twice as likely to develop anxiety disorders by late adolescence, including social phobia.

A related line of research has investigated 'behavioural inhibition' in infants – early signs of an inhibited and introspective or fearful nature. Studies have shown that around 10–15 percent of individuals show this early temperament, which appears to be partly due to genetics. Some continue to show this trait into adolescence and adulthood and appear to be more likely to develop a social anxiety disorder.

=== Social experiences ===
A previous negative social experience can be a trigger to social phobia, perhaps particularly for individuals high in "interpersonal sensitivity". For around half of those diagnosed with social anxiety disorder, a specific traumatic or humiliating social event appears to be associated with the onset or worsening of the disorder; this kind of event appears to be particularly related to specific social phobia, for example, regarding public speaking. As well as direct experiences, observing or hearing about the socially negative experiences of others (e.g. a faux pas committed by someone), or verbal warnings of social problems and dangers, may also make the development of a social anxiety disorder more likely. Social anxiety disorder may be caused by the longer-term effects of not fitting in, or being bullied, rejected, or ignored. Shy adolescents or avoidant adults have emphasized unpleasant experiences with peers or childhood bullying or harassment. In one study, popularity was found to be negatively correlated with social anxiety, and children who were neglected by their peers reported higher social anxiety and fear of negative evaluation than other categories of children. Socially phobic children appear less likely to receive positive reactions from peers, and anxious or inhibited children may isolate themselves.

=== Parental influences ===
Different parenting styles can also contribute to the development of social anxiety disorder. The common negative parenting styles, such as overcontrol and criticism can be detrimental for a child to be able to overcome difficult situations. More aggressive and harsh parenting styles that include both verbal abuse and physical punishment are linked with an insecure attachment and risk for social anxiety disorder. On the contrary, positive parenting that fosters a more supportive and warm environment for the child is correlated to a decreased risk of developing this disorder. On the biological level as well, there is strong evidence that states how children from parents with social anxiety disorder have significantly increased risk to the disorder.

=== Cultural influences ===
Cultural factors that have been related to social anxiety disorder include a society's attitude towards shyness and avoidance, affecting the ability to form relationships or access employment or education, and shame. One study found that the effects of parenting are different depending on the culture: American children appear more likely to develop social anxiety disorder if their parents emphasize the importance of others' opinions and use shame as a disciplinary strategy, but this association was not found for Chinese/Chinese-American children. In China, research has indicated that shy-inhibited children are more accepted than their peers and more likely to be considered for leadership and considered competent, in contrast to the findings in Western countries. Purely demographic variables may also play a role.

Problems in developing social skills, or 'social fluency', may be a cause of some social anxiety disorder, through either inability or lack of confidence to interact socially and gain positive reactions and acceptance from others. The studies have been mixed, however, with some studies not finding significant problems in social skills while others have. What does seem clear is that the socially anxious perceive their own social skills to be low. It may be that the increasing need for sophisticated social skills in forming relationships or careers, and an emphasis on assertiveness and competitiveness, is making social anxiety problems more common, at least among the 'middle classes'. An interpersonal or media emphasis on 'normal' or 'attractive' personal characteristics has also been argued to fuel perfectionism and feelings of inferiority or insecurity regarding negative evaluation from others. The human drive for social acceptance and evolutionary social status has been heavily explored in foundational psychological research. Specifically, evolutionary models view social anxiety as an adaptive mechanism designed to prevent social exclusion and monitor interpersonal threats, while sociometer theory suggests that self-esteem functions as an internal gauge tracking an individual's level of social acceptance.

=== Substance-induced ===
While alcohol initially relieves social phobia, excessive alcohol misuse can worsen social phobia symptoms and cause panic disorder to develop or worsen during alcohol intoxication and especially during alcohol withdrawal syndrome. This effect is not unique to alcohol but can also occur with long-term use of drugs that have a similar mechanism of action to alcohol such as the benzodiazepines which are sometimes prescribed as tranquillisers. Benzodiazepines possess anti-anxiety properties and can be useful for the short-term treatment of severe anxiety. Like the anticonvulsants, they tend to be mild and well-tolerated, although there is a risk of habit-forming. Benzodiazepines are usually administered orally for the treatment of anxiety; however, occasionally lorazepam or diazepam may be given intravenously for the treatment of panic attacks.

The World Council of Anxiety does not recommend benzodiazepines for the long-term treatment of anxiety due to a range of problems associated with long-term use including tolerance, psychomotor impairment, cognitive and memory impairments, physical dependence and a benzodiazepine withdrawal syndrome upon discontinuation of benzodiazepines. Despite increasing focus on the use of antidepressants and other agents for the treatment of anxiety, benzodiazepines have remained a mainstay of anxiolytic pharmacotherapy due to their robust efficacy, rapid onset of therapeutic effect, and generally favorable side effect profile. Treatment patterns for psychotropic drugs appear to have remained stable over the past decade, with benzodiazepines being the most commonly used medication for panic disorder.

Many people who are addicted to alcohol or prescribed benzodiazepines when it is explained to them they have a choice between ongoing ill mental health or quitting and recovering from their symptoms decide on quitting alcohol or their benzodiazepines. Symptoms may temporarily worsen however, during alcohol withdrawal or benzodiazepine withdrawal.

=== Psychological factors ===
Research has indicated the role of 'core' or 'unconditional' negative beliefs (e.g. "I am inept") and 'conditional' beliefs nearer to the surface (e.g. "If I show myself, I will be rejected"). They are thought to develop based on personality and adverse experiences and to be activated when the person feels under threat. Recent research has also highlighted that conditional beliefs may also be at play (e.g., "If people see I'm anxious, they'll think that I'm weak").

A secondary factor is self-concealment which involves concealing the expression of one's anxiety or its underlying beliefs. One line of work has focused more specifically on the key role of self-presentational concerns. The resulting anxiety states are seen as interfering with social performance and the ability to concentrate on interaction, which in turn creates more social problems, which strengthens the negative schema. Also highlighted has been a high focus on and worry about anxiety symptoms themselves and how they might appear to others. A similar model emphasizes the development of a distorted mental representation of the self and overestimates of the likelihood and consequences of negative evaluation, and of the performance standards that others have. Such cognitive-behavioral models consider the role of negatively biased memories of the past and the processes of rumination after an event (also known as post-event processing), and fearful anticipation before it.

Studies have also highlighted the role of subtle avoidance and defensive factors, and shown how attempts to avoid feared negative evaluations or use of "safety behaviors" can make social interaction more difficult and the anxiety worse in the long run. This work has been influential in the development of cognitive behavioral therapy for social anxiety disorder, which has been shown to have efficacy.

== Diagnosis ==
ICD-10 defines social phobia as fear of scrutiny by other people leading to avoidance of social situations. The anxiety symptoms may present as a complaint of blushing, hand tremor, nausea, or urgency of urination. Symptoms may progress to panic attacks.

Standardized rating scales such as the Social Phobia Inventory, the SPAI-B, Liebowitz Social Anxiety Scale, and the Social Interaction Anxiety Scale can be used to screen for social anxiety disorder and measure the severity of anxiety.

SAD is categorized into two main types:

Generalized Social Anxiety Disorder: Affects nearly all aspects of a person's social life, making everyday interactions extremely stressful.

Specific (Performance-Based) Social Anxiety Disorder: Individuals feel extreme nervousness in specific situations, like giving a speech or performing on stage.

=== DSM-5 diagnostic criteria ===
Although the DSM defines social anxiety disorder as an intense fear or anxiety of social situations, it makes clear a distinction to separate social anxiety disorder from simply social anxiety or social fear.

==== Social situations ====
- The anxiety must occur in a social setting under circumstances that are conducive to the possible scrutiny of others.
  - For children, the DSM-5 notes that the anxiety must be in a setting with other children and not with adults.
- Social situations induce and are avoided due to the intense feelings of anxiety or fear.
- Social situations must be the cause of anxiety or fear.

The DSM-5 notes that for social anxiety disorder, the fear must be attributed or correlated to social situations and not another condition.

==== Anxiety ====
- The fear or anxiety is out of reasonable proportion to the context of the situation.
- The fear or anxiety affects an individual for an abnormally long time – 6 months or more.
- There is a significant negative impact on an individual's life due to fear or anxiety in a social, professional, or other life event.

To determine a reasonable proportion, an individual's sociocultural situation is assessed. Different cultures have individual criteria for determining a reasonable fear to a learned behavior for a particular social situation. Criteria for anxiety assess whether a fear has a significant impact on social, professional, or other life function.

==== Other causes ====
- Condition is not a psychological effect induced by a substance (e.g., drugs, alcohol or other medication).
- Condition is not a psychological effect induced by another medical condition.
- Condition is not a psychological effect induced by another mental disorder.

==== Performance ====
- Fear is limited to only public speaking or public performing

The DSM-5 notes that performance only type of social anxiety disorder (a subset specific version of this disorder) often affects individual's professional lives of those involved with public speaking or public performing. These fears can arise in settings other than just an individual's professional life but are limited to only public social performance situations.

=== Differential diagnosis ===
Social anxiety disorder is often linked to bipolar disorder and attention deficit hyperactivity disorder (ADHD), leading to an assumption of a shared cyclothymic-anxious-sensitive disposition. The co-occurrence of ADHD and social phobia is common, especially when cognitive disengagement syndrome is present.

== Treatment ==
=== Psychotherapies ===
The first-line treatment for social anxiety disorder is cognitive behavioral therapy (CBT), with medications such as selective serotonin reuptake inhibitors (SSRIs) sometimes used in combination with CBT. The purpose of CBT is to help individuals address unhelpful thinking patterns and behaviors that contribute to emotional distress. Self-help based on principles of CBT is an alternative option for those unable to access in-person mental health services.

Another treatment with a growing evidence base for social anxiety disorder is metacognitive therapy (MCT), which targets the underlying processes that maintain the disorder. More specifically, the aim of MCT is to identify and modify dysfunctional metacognitive beliefs that contribute to and sustain a perseverative style of thinking known as the cognitive attentional syndrome (CAS), which comprises worry and rumination, threat monitoring, self-focused attention, and maladaptive coping behaviors. Some studies have suggested that MCT may be superior to CBT for social anxiety disorder.

There is emerging evidence for the use of acceptance and commitment therapy (ACT) in the treatment of social anxiety disorder. ACT is considered an offshoot of traditional CBT and emphasizes accepting unpleasant symptoms rather than fighting against them, as well as psychological flexibility – the ability to adapt to changing situational demands, to shift one's perspective, and to balance competing desires. ACT may be useful as an alternative treatment for the disorder in situations where CBT is ineffective or refused.

Some studies have suggested social skills training can help with social anxiety. Examples of social skills that may be modified for social anxiety disorder include initiating conversations, establishing friendships, interacting with members of the preferred sex, constructing a speech, and assertiveness skills. However, it is not clear whether specific social skills techniques and training are required, rather than just support with general social functioning and exposure to social situations.

Social anxiety disorder may predict subsequent development of other psychiatric disorders, such as depression. Social anxiety disorder remains under-recognized in primary care practice, with people presenting for treatment only after the onset of complications, such as clinical depression or substance use disorders.

=== Medications ===
A comparison of the treatment effects on social anxiety disorder showed that using a medication is faster, while CBT is longer-lasting. Using antidepressants for treating social anxiety disorder is typically not as effective as using CBT.

==== SSRIs and SNRIs ====
Selective serotonin reuptake inhibitors (SSRIs), a class of antidepressants, are the first choice of medication for generalized social phobia but a second-line treatment. Compared to older forms of medication, there is less risk of tolerability and drug dependence associated with SSRIs. Paroxetine and paroxetine ER, sertraline, venlafaxine ER, and fluvoxamine ER (Luvox CR) are all approved and effective for treating social anxiety disorder. The effectiveness of medications other than paroxetine is small.

General side effects are common during the first weeks while the body adjusts to SSRI drugs. Symptoms may include headaches, nausea, insomnia, and changes in sexual behavior.

==== Other drugs ====
Other prescription drugs are also used, if other methods are not effective. Before the introduction of SSRIs, monoamine oxidase inhibitors (MAOIs) such as phenelzine were frequently used in the treatment of social anxiety. Evidence continues to indicate that MAOIs are effective in the treatment and management of social anxiety disorder and they are still used, but generally only as a last-resort medication, owing to concerns about dietary restrictions, possible adverse drug interactions and a recommendation of multiple doses per day. RIMAs have been found to be less efficacious for social anxiety disorder than irreversible MAOIs like phenelzine. Serotonergic anxiolytic buspirone may also be used.

Propranolol, a beta blocker commonly used to control high blood pressure, is used for performance anxiety specifically.

Mirtazapine, atypical tetracyclic antidepressant, appears to have some efficacy and utility in treating social anxiety disorder, especially if the previous SSRIs medications were intolerable.

Pregabalin at high doses appears to have modest efficacy. Gabapentin has been investigated for social anxiety disorder in preliminary long-term studies.

Anticonvulsants, tricyclic antidepressants, antipsychotic drugs, and St. John's wort should not be used. Guidelines vary regarding whether benzodiazepines should be used.

== Epidemiology ==
Country	Prevalence
United States	2–7%
England	0.4% (children)
Scotland	1.8% (children)
Wales	0.6% (children)
Australia	1–2.7%
Brazil	4.7–7.9%
India	12.8% (adolescents)
Iran	0.8%
Israel	4.5%
Nigeria	9.4% (university students)
Sweden	15.6% (university students)
Turkey	9.6% (university students)
Poland	7–9% (2002)
Taiwan	7% children (2002–2008)

Social anxiety disorder is known to appear at an early age in most cases. Fifty percent of those who develop this disorder have developed it by the age of 11, and 80% have developed it by age 20. This early age of onset may lead to people with social anxiety disorder being particularly vulnerable to depressive illnesses, substance use, and other psychological conflicts.

The National Comorbidity Survey of over 8,000 American correspondents in 1994 revealed 12-month and lifetime prevalence rates of 7.9 percent and 13.3 percent, respectively; this makes it the third most prevalent psychiatric disorder after depression and alcohol use disorder, and the most common of the anxiety disorders. According to US epidemiological data from the National Institute of Mental Health, social phobia affects 15 million adult Americans in any given year. Estimates vary within 2 percent and 7 percent of the US adult population.

The mean onset of social phobia is 10 to 13 years. Onset after age 25 is rare and is typically preceded by panic disorder or major depression. Social anxiety disorder occurs more often in females than males. The prevalence of social phobia appears to be increasing among white, married, and well-educated individuals. As a group, those with generalized social phobia are less likely to graduate from high school and are more likely to rely on government financial assistance or have poverty-level salaries. Surveys carried out in 2002 show the youth of England, Scotland, and Wales have a prevalence rate of 0.4 percent, 1.8 percent, and 0.6 percent, respectively. In Canada, the prevalence of self-reported social anxiety for Nova Scotians older than 14 years was 4.2 percent in June 2004 with women (4.6 percent) reporting more than men (3.8 percent). In Australia, social phobia is the 8th and 5th leading disease or illness for males and females between 15 and 24 years of age as of 2003. Because of the difficulty in separating social phobia from poor social skills or shyness, some studies have a large range of prevalence.

== History ==
Literary descriptions of shyness can be traced back to the days of Hippocrates around 400 BC. Hippocrates described someone who "through bashfulness, suspicion, and timorousness, will not be seen abroad; loves darkness as life and cannot endure the light or to sit in lightsome places; his hat still in his eyes, he will neither see, nor be seen by his good will. He dare not come in company for fear he should be misused, disgraced, overshoot himself in gesture or speeches, or be sick; he thinks every man observes him".

The first mention of the psychiatric term "social phobia" (phobie des situations sociales) was made in the early 1900s. Psychologists used the term "social neurosis" to describe extremely shy patients in the 1930s. After extensive work by Joseph Wolpe on systematic desensitization, research on phobias and their treatment grew. The idea that social phobia was a separate entity from other phobias came from the British psychiatrist Isaac Marks in the 1960s. This was accepted by the American Psychiatric Association and was first officially included in the third edition of the Diagnostic and Statistical Manual of Mental Disorders (DSM-III).

== Research ==
Although social anxiety disorder has been under study for decades, the underlying neurobiology is not well understood. Neurotransmitters under research include serotonin, dopamine, and glutamate. Neuroimaging technologies are in use to clarify brain regions involved. The amygdala is a primary brain structure involved in SAD, as explored in imaging studies.

Parenting that is intrusive or controlling and stressful life events may increase the risk for SAD development during childhood, extending into adult years. Genetic factors may have a role, although genetic biomarkers are not specifically identified.

== See also ==
- Agoraphobia – Anxiety disorder
- Alexithymia – Deficiency in understanding, processing, or describing emotions
- Asociality – Lack of motivation to engage in social interaction
- Avoidant Personality Disorder – Personality disorder
- Impostor syndrome – Psychological pattern
- Obsessive-compulsive disorder – Mental disorder
- Scopophobia – Fear of being stared at
- Selective mutism – Anxiety disorder blocking speech
- Sensory processing sensitivity – Personality trait of highly sensitive persons
- Social inhibition – Deliberate avoidance of social interaction
- Social rejection – Exclusion of someone from social relations
- Taijin kyofusho – Japanese social phobia
- List of investigational social anxiety disorder drugs
