= Social Phobia and Anxiety Inventory-Brief form =

- Synonyms: SPAI-B
- Purpose: evaluates symptoms of social anxiety

Social Phobia and Anxiety Inventory Brief, abbreviated as (SPAI-B), is a Spanish version of the Social Phobia and Anxiety Inventory. It evaluates the same psychological factors as SPAI related to cognition, behavior and somatic symptoms usually exhibited by persons with social anxiety. Although the psychometrics have been found to be sound, its utility as a screening measure is limited by its length. As an attempt to resolve this situation, Deborah Beidel from University of Central Florida (US), along with an international team led by Dr. Garcia-Lopez at the University of Jaen (Spain) developed this form in 2008.

== Scoring ==
The SPAI-B consists of 16 items that are answered with a Likert scale of 5 points (instead of 7, as in the original form). While the original SPAI may be especially useful in providing clinical information for a wide range of social situations, it is time-consuming. Alternatively, the SPAI-B appeared to be especially valuable as a screening tool and easily administered in both clinical and community settings. The SPAI-B is composed of 16 items, half the length of the original subscale (32 items) and almost two-thirds the length of the original scale (45 items). Reduction in the time required to administer the inventory is also significant (approximately, 5 vs. 30 minutes). Psychometric properties in Portuguese and Spanish adolescents and young adults taking either a paper-and-pencil or an online survey have been reported. Recently, another brief version of the SPAI has been developed for adults. Beidel, along with a team from the University of Amsterdam (The Netherlands) have developed the SPAI-18. Data from an in-press paper reveals that the SPAI-18 is a psychometrically sound instrument with good screening capacity for social anxiety disorder in clinical as well as community samples. This scale has fewer items than the one developed by Beidel and her team in 2007 to tap social anxiety in adults, named as SPAI-23.

The sum of the scores is up to 90 points, but 16 points must be discounted (as minimum score is 16). In adolescents, a rounded cut-off score of 25 was set up. In young adults, research supports a rounded cut-off point of 23 for the DSM-5 specific subtype of performance or public speaking and 24 for overall social anxiety. The generalized specifier for social anxiety disorder (formerly, social phobia) changed in favor of a performance-only (i.e., public-speaking or performance) specifier in DSM-5.

== See also ==
- Diagnostic classification and rating scales used in psychiatry
- Screening (medicine)
- Social anxiety disorder
