= Deborah Beidel =

American clinical psychologist

Deborah C. Beidel
- Education: University of Pittsburgh (PhD, 1986)
- Known for: Research on anxiety and posttraumatic stress disorder (PTSD)
- Awards: Association for Advancement of Behavior Therapy New Researcher Award (1990); Association of Medical School Psychologists Distinguished Educator Award (1995); APA Division 12 Samuel M. Turner Clinical Research Award (2007)
- Scientific career
- Fields: Clinical psychology, behavioral psychology
- Workplaces: University of Central Florida; University of Pittsburgh; Medical University of South Carolina; University of Maryland; Penn State College of Medicine

Deborah C. Beidel is a psychologist affiliated with the University of Central Florida. She received a PhD in clinical psychology in 1986 from the University of Pittsburgh. She subsequently completed a postdoctoral fellowship in clinical research at the Western Psychiatric Institute and Clinic in Pittsburgh. Beidel holds Diplomates in Clinical Psychology and Behavioral Psychology from the American Board of Professional Psychology. She is also a Fellow of the American Psychological Association and the Association for Psychological Science.

Beidel has authored more than 275 scientific publications including journal articles, books, and chapters. The focus of her research is on the treatment of anxiety and posttraumatic stress disorder. Most recently, her work has focused on developing treatments for PTSD veterans, active duty personnel, and first responders. She has advanced the use of technology to enhance treatment in standard clinical practice. Her current research interests include familial stress during military deployment and the potential role of artificially intelligent avatars in assisting the treatment of children with social anxiety disorders. Over the course of her career, Beidel has received over $19 million in research funding.

Prior to joining the University of Central Florida, Beidel was a member of the faculty at the University of Pittsburgh, the Medical University of South Carolina, the University of Maryland, and Penn State College of Medicine. In 1990, she was the recipient of the Association for Advancement of Behavior Therapy's New Researcher Award. In 1995 she received the Distinguished Educator Award from the Association of Medical School Psychologists. Most recently, in 2007, she received the APA Division 12 Samuel M. Turner Clinical Research Award.

== See also ==
- Social Phobia and Anxiety Inventory-Brief form
