= Liebowitz Social Anxiety Scale =

Social anxiety assessment tool

The Liebowitz Social Anxiety Scale (LSAS) is a short questionnaire developed in 1987 by Michael Liebowitz, a psychiatrist and researcher at Columbia University and the New York State Psychiatric Institute. Its purpose is to assess the range of social interaction and performance situations feared by a patient in order to assist in the diagnosis of social anxiety disorder. It is commonly used to study outcomes in clinical trials and, more recently, to evaluate the effectiveness of cognitive-behavioral treatments. The scale features 24 items, which are divided into two subscales. 13 questions relate to performance anxiety and 11 concern social situations. The LSAS was originally conceptualized as a clinician-administered rating scale, but has since been validated as a self-report scale.

== Introduction ==
To assess social phobia, psychologists and clinicians need to distinguish between performance anxiety and social interaction anxiety in order to make an accurate diagnosis. Social phobia was included in the Diagnostic and Statistical Manual of Mental Disorders, third edition (DSM-III). In the DSM-III-R and DSM-IV revisions, further expansion of the social phobia definition were included to better assess fears in social-interaction situations. Social phobia is defined by a persistent fear of embarrassment or negative evaluation while engaged in social interaction or public performance. However, lack of empirical data made it difficult to differentiate and relate different types of feared situations and social interactions. The Liebowitz Social Anxiety Scale (LSAS) was the first clinician-administered scale developed for the assessment of fear and avoidance associated with social phobia. The LSAS has a broad scope in assessment of both social interactions and performance/observation situations. Since its invention, the LSAS has been used in many cognitive-behavioral treatments of social phobia. The LSAS is the most frequently used form of social anxiety assessment in research, clinical-based, and pharmacotherapy studies.

== Scoring ==
The scale is composed of 24 items divided into 2 subscales, 13 concerning performance anxiety, and 11 pertaining to social situations. The 24 items are first rated on a Likert Scale from 0 to 3 on fear felt during the situations, and then the same items are rated regarding avoidance of the situation. Combining the total scores for the Fear and Avoidance sections provides an overall score with a maximum of 144 points. The clinician administered version of the test has four more subscale scores, which the self-administered test does not have. These additional four subscales are: fear of social interaction, fear of performance, avoidance of social interaction and avoidance of performance. Usually, the sum of the total fear and total avoidance scores are used in determining the final score (thus, essentially it uses the same numbers as the self-administered test). Research supports a cut-off point of 30, in which SAD is unlikely. The next cut-off point is at 60, at which SAD is probable. Scores in this range are typical of persons entering treatment for the non-generalized type of SAD. Scores between 60 and 90 indicate that SAD is very probable. Scores in this range are typical of persons entering treatment for the generalized type of SAD. Scores higher than 90 indicate that SAD is highly probable. Scores in this range often are accompanied by great distress and difficulty in social functioning, and are also commonly seen in persons entering treatment for the generalized type of SAD.

The specific subtype of social anxiety disorder involves fear of one or several kinds of social/performance situations (often public speaking.)

The generalized subtype of social anxiety disorder is characterized by fear of most social/performance situations.

== Reliability and validity ==
Heimberg et al. (1992) found that scores on the Liebowitz Social Anxiety Scale were significantly correlated with scores of two other scales, which had demonstrated significant reliability and validity in several studies before. Those two scales are the Social Phobia Scale and the Social Interaction Anxiety Scale. In another study, Heimberg et al. (1999) also found that the LSAS is closely related to other scales, including the HRSD, BDI and the HAMA.

Research found that the internal consistency of the LSAS is high, too. In a large study, LSAS scores were compared with scores for Total fear, Fear of social interaction, Fear of performance, Total avoidance, Avoidance of social interaction and Avoidance of performance. Scores for total fear and social interaction were extremely high with correlations of .94 and .92, respectively.

It was also found that phenelzine was associated with LSAS scores that had post-treatment scores with standard deviations at least half higher than patients in placebo treatment.

Safren and colleagues found that the relationship between social interactional anxiety and performance anxiety in their studies, showed high face validity but lacked construct validity. This study and others suggest the need for more research based on empirical approaches.

== LSAS self-report questionnaire ==
The LSAS has been used as a self-report measure (LSAS-SR). Studies by Baker and colleagues have shown a high reliability and validity to the self-report questionnaire, consistent with the clinician-administered version of the LSAS, with the only exception being the fear subscale of performance situations. All subscales measures show high test-retest reliability. However, some differences did exist between clinician and the self-report measures. For a full discussion see Baker and Cox. Research has also established the structural validity and other metric qualities (i.e., internal reliability, test-retest) of the French adaptation of the LSAS-SR.

== LSAS for children and adolescents (LSAS-CA) ==
Similarly to the regular LSAS, the LSAS-CA also has a clinician administered version of the rest and a self-report version (LSAS-CA-SR). In the clinician administered version, subjects with social anxiety disorder had significantly higher LSAS-CA scores than subjects with other anxiety disorders and healthy controls. The study also showed high internal consistency and high test-retest reliability. The self-report version of the Scale has been extensively tested on the Spanish population, with results high in validity and reliability. They also found significant differences in the scores for some sub-scales (total fear) between males and females. Recent studies have also established the structural validity of the French version of the test, including reliable internal consistency and other psychometric properties.
