= Social fluency =

Proficiency in social situations

Social fluency is the concept of demonstrating proficiency in social situations and/or inter-personal relations. Social Fluency is frequently discussed in the academic areas of social interaction, psychological anthropology and social development. Various schools of philosophy, chiefly virtue ethics, compare social fluency to wittiness and clearly illustrate it as a desirable personality trait.

Social fluency has also been declared a synonym for social processing speed.

American academic M.J. Packer illustrated the importance of Social Fluency in his 1987 work Social interaction as practical activity: Implications for the study of social and moral development. He declared "I want to propose that social fluency is at least as important a telos for social development as the formation of explicit theories, principles and hypotheses about the social world... More explicitly, social development consists in (sic) increasingly broadened fluency: becoming socially fluent in an increased range of situations and subworlds...”

== Literature ==
- Cottingham, John (1998). Philosophy and the good life: reason and the passions in Greek, Cartesian, and psychoanalytic ethics. (pp. 154) Cambridge University Press
- Bellini, Scott (2006). Building Social Relationships: A Systematic Approach to Teaching Social Interaction Skills to Children and Adolescents with Autism Spectrum Disorders and Other Social Difficulties. (pp. 46) Autism Asperger Publishing Company
- Packer, M.J. (1987). Moral Development Through Social Interaction (Wiley Series on Personality Processes). (pp. 267) Wiley Interscience
