= Hypervigilance =

Nervous system condition

Hypervigilance is a condition of the nervous system where sensory information is inaccurately and rapidly filtered, in an enhanced state of sensory sensitivity. This appears to be linked to a dysregulated nervous system, and hypervigilant symptoms are clinically described in complex post-traumatic stress disorder. Normally, the nervous system releases stress signals (e.g. norepinephrine) in certain situations as a defense mechanism to protect one from perceived dangers. In some cases, the nervous system becomes chronically dysregulated, causing a release of stress signals that are inappropriate to the situation, creating inappropriate and exaggerated responses. Hypervigilance may bring about a state of increased anxiety which can cause exhaustion. Other symptoms include high responsiveness to stimuli and constant scanning of the environment.

Hypervigilant symptoms are clinically described as a perpetual scanning of the environment to search for sights, sounds, people, behaviors, smells, or anything else that is reminiscent of activity, threat or trauma. The individual is on high alert in order to be certain danger is not near; it can lead to a variety of obsessive behavior patterns, as well as producing difficulties with social interaction and relationships, with these symptoms also appearing in borderline personality disorder.

The condition is distinguished from dysphoric hyperarousal in that the person remains cogent and aware of their surroundings. In dysphoric hyperarousal, a person with PTSD may lose contact with reality and re-experience the traumatic event verbatim. Where there have been multiple traumas, a person may become hypervigilant and suffer severe anxiety attacks intense enough to induce a delusional state where the effects of related traumas overlap. This can result in the thousand-yard stare.

== Chronic pain ==
Multiple studies have examined hypervigilance in relation to chronic pain conditions, namely fibromyalgia and rheumatoid arthritis.

== Symptoms ==
People suffering from hypervigilance may become preoccupied with scanning their environment for possible threats. They might overreact to loud and unexpected noises, exhibit an overactive startle response or become agitated in highly crowded or noisy environments. They will often have a difficult time getting to sleep or staying asleep. Sustained states of hypervigilance, lasting for a decade or more, may lead to higher sensitivity to disturbances in their local environment, and an inability to tolerate large gatherings or groups. After resolution of the situation demanding their attention, people exhibiting hypervigilance may be exhausted and require time before returning to normal activities.

== See also ==
- Trauma trigger
- Paranoid personality disorder
