= Purim pranks =

Pranks during Purim

Purim pranks are pranks pulled during the celebration of Purim, an element of Purim humor.

Some Purim pranks may be insulting and even harmful. There is a scholarship on what Halakha says on whether harm, insult (lashon hara), or injury – whether physical (towards property or a person) or verbal – are admissible in the course of Purim pranks or jokes. There are various interpretations, however Rav Yosef Zvi Rimon comes to a conclusion that insults and minor physical harm are admissible as long they are sincere expressions of joy of mitzva and the harmful acts were not of evil intention; this kind of humor must be used with caution. Purim jokes are for the joy of mitzva, not for just jesting. Purim spiels may include a good deal of insults and foul language directed both at biblical characters and modern real persons.

== Notable public Purim pranks ==
In early December of 2023 posts were circulating in the media that Mick Jagger announced planning a concert of Rolling Stones in Israel. Reuters suggested that the rumors appear to be based on a February 24, 2013 spoof article at The Jewish Press website, which at the bottom said: "This has been a Purim prank...".

On February 24, 2021 (a day before Purim that year), The Jerusalem Post tweeted that Benjamin Netanyahu could not get hold of Joe Biden for a month because the latter gave him a wrong number which replied "Hello, this is not the person you were trying to call. You’ve reached the rejection hotline. Unfortunately the person who gave you this rejection hotline number did not want you to have their real number."

In March 2019 Esther Voet, a columnist of a respected Dutch Jewish weekly NIW announced that she was moving to Israel, where "getting called a dirty Jew simply means I have to take a bath", complaining about the rise of anti-Semitism in the country. Later she announced that it was a Purim prank, but not earlier than her announcement made waves and she received notes of condolence and wishes of good luck from one camp and "good riddance" from the other.

In March 2017, one of the annual Purim pranks pulled by the officials of the town of Psagot went too far: the social media got ahold of a letter on local official stationery that Jared Kushner and Ivanka Trump would be visiting the town for Shabbos and Kushner would be delivering a dvar Torah in the local synagogue. Hundreds of people from the nearby places phoned the residents of Psagot to ask for a stay during the event, while leftist groups started arranging buses with protesters.

March 2014:

- The Jerusalem Post published a spoof article on how Israel, who didn’t even qualify for the 2014 World Cup (and which didn't even start yet), won the trophy.
- The Dutch media was hoaxed by news of Barack Obama planning to visit the Amsterdam office of the Dutch Jewish Welfare Organization (JMW). After realizing the scale of the commotion the joke caused, the authors, Jonet.nl, and JMW, issued a public apology.
- The Forward reported on the previously kept secret speech of George W. Bush to the "Messianic Jewish Bible Institute" about their mission of bringing "Jewish people into a personal relationship of faith with Yeshua the Messiah."
- There were reports about "The Beatles Jewish Period", which included songs, such as "The Shul on the Hill", "Hey Yew", "This Goy", etc.

2010:

- The residents of Bnei Brak fell to the prank pulled by a construction company ZAKA, who announced that oil was about to be drilled there, with posters, equipment, and all, and hinted that the residents would be exempt from local property taxes.
- Ha'aretz made a spoof report that a law was passed by the Knesset to allow for sponsorship messages to be laser-beamed onto the Western Wall for a fee.
