= Sociometer =

Psychological theory of self-esteem

Sociometer theory is a theory of self-esteem from an evolutionary psychological perspective which proposes that self-esteem is a gauge (or sociometer) of interpersonal relationships.

This theoretical perspective was first introduced by Mark Leary and colleagues in 1995 and later expanded on by Kirkpatrick and Ellis. In Leary's research, the idea of self-esteem as a sociometer is discussed in depth. This theory was created as a response to psychological phenomenon i.e. social emotions, inter- and intra- personal behaviors, self-serving biases, and reactions to rejection. Based on this theory, self-esteem is a measure of effectiveness in social relations and interactions that monitors acceptance and/or rejection from others. With this, an emphasis is placed on relational value, which is the degree to which a person regards his or her relationship with another, and how it affects day-to-day life. Confirmed by various studies and research, if a person is deemed having relational value, they are more likely to have higher self-esteem.

The main concept of sociometer theory is that the self-esteem system acts as a gauge to measure the quality of an individual's current and forthcoming relationships. Furthermore, this measurement of self-esteem assesses these two types of relationships in terms of relational appreciation. This is how other people might view and value the relationships they hold with the individual. If relational appreciation of an individual differs negatively, relational devaluation is experienced. Relational devaluation exists in the format of belongingness, with a negative alteration allowing the sociometer gauge to highlight these threats, producing emotional distress to act to regain relational appreciation and restore balance in the individual's self-esteem.

According to Leary, there are five main groups associated with relational value that are classified as those affording the greatest impact on an individual. They are: 1) macro-level, i.e., communities, 2) instrumental coalitions, i.e., teams, committees, 3) mating relationships, 4) kin relationships, and 5) friendships.

A study was conducted to see just how much people depend on peers and outside factors and relational values to regulate their life. The objective of the study was to pick groups for an activity based on the evaluations given by the students. In the study, two groups were assigned. Both groups consisted of college students that submitted and were subjected to a peer evaluation. The difference being that the control group of students chose if they 1) wanted to interact with the person or 2) dissociated from the person. When previously asked, some students stated that they were indifferent or did not care what others' opinions of them were. However, when results were analyzed there was a great deal of fluctuation in overall self-esteem. Those who were placed in the second group (of dissociation), receiving a low relational value, displayed a lowered self-esteem. As a result, this compromised the way they assessed a/the situation. In the first group, where perceived relational value was high, self-esteem was also high. This provides some evidence for an evolutionary basis in the fundamental human need for inclusion in a group, and the burden of being on the outskirts of social acceptance.

Cameron and Stinson further review the sociometer theory definition, highlighting two key constructs of the concept:

- Specific experiences of social acceptance and rejection are internalised to form a representation of one's own worth and effort they are contributing as a social partner.
- The higher self-esteem someone has the more they will perceive as being valued by others. For individuals with low self-esteem, they question their value as a social partner, often letting their subsequent insecurities devolve onto future relationships.

== Types of self-esteem relating to sociometer theory ==
- State self-esteem gauges the person's level of current relational appreciation and assesses the likelihood to which the individual is to be accepted and included versus rejected and excluded by other people in the immediate situation. The state self-esteem system monitors the person's behaviour and social environment for cues relevant to relational evaluation and responds with affective and motivational consequences when cues relevant to exclusion are detected.
- Trait self-esteem is a subjective measure of how likely an individual is to be accepted or rejected in a social situation. This form of self-esteem aids in the assessment of an individual in social situations, furthermore estimating whether current or future relationships would be respected and valued long-term.
- Global self-esteem is a stable, internal measure of self-esteem that an individual elicits to assess the potential global outlook that different races, ethnicities and communities might say about an individual. Often, this internal measure of self-esteem is beneficial in restoring relational appreciation if an individual's self-esteem drops below normal levels.
- Domain-specific self-esteem is a measure by which an individual will examine their own accomplishments such as in social, academic, and athletics situations which could alter self-esteem. This domain specific measure is an effective way to identify outliers in a current performance, instead of creating a misinformed trend (i.e that you are consistently underperforming).

== Evidence in support ==
Support for Sociometer Theory has come from an international, cross sequential study conducted in the Netherlands, assessing self-esteem in 1599 seven and eight year olds. The study examined firstly how self-esteem would develop in childhood, and secondly whether self-esteem develops alongside changing peer and family relationships. Inter-individual differences and intra-individual changes in social support over time were assessed. Mean-level self-esteem was found to remain stable in middle childhood and elicited no alterations. Additionally, both within and between person level assessments elicited positive reports of self esteem, showing a more robust social network from self-report measures that participants completed after these assessments.

Cameron and Stinson again showed evidence in support for Sociometer Theory by demonstrating acceptance and rejection experiences can have a strong influence on self-esteem levels both in the short and long-term.

- Self-esteem is responsive to social acceptance and rejection: State self-esteem (self-esteem in the immediate situation) is heavily responsive to both social acceptance and rejection. It is known that that acceptance causes increases in state self-esteem and rejection elicits negative views in self-esteem to occur. In a laboratory setting, these alterations are due to future projections of social rejection/acceptance or remembering past experiences in which social rejection/acceptance occurred which can allow an individual's self-esteem to subjectively deviate from normal levels.
- Global self-esteem is associated with perceptions of social worth: Social worth is a concept that can be utilised as a sociometer to measure self-esteem. Furthermore, this association is thought to exist because global self-esteem influences self-views in a top-down manner. In this top-down process, the traits that are normally associated with the sense of belongingness in social situations act to mediate self-esteem. Additionally, if this top-down manner of global self-esteem influences self-views, then an individual's perceptions of their belongingness and social worth should be positively correlated with global self-esteem.
- Self-esteem regulates responses to acceptance and rejection: Sociometer theory emphasises that a negative alteration in self-esteem should disrupt the self-esteem system balance, alarming the sociometer to distinguish these discrepancies, allowing for behaviour that restores this balance by restoring belongingness and an individual's self-worth in social situations.

== See also ==
- Assertiveness
- Body image
- Clinical depression
- Deep social mind
- Evolutionary psychology and culture
- Fear of negative evaluation
- Identity
- Inner critic
- Invisible support
- List of confidence tricks
- Optimism bias
- Outline of self
- Overconfidence effect
- Passiveness
- Performance anxiety
- Primate empathy
- Self image
- Self-affirmation
- Self-awareness
- Self-compassion
- Self-confidence
- Self-enhancement
- Self-esteem functions
- Self-esteem instability
- Self-evaluation maintenance theory
- Shyness
- Simulation theory of empathy
- Social anxiety
- Social phobia
