= Nerve centre =

Nerve centre can refer to:

- Nerve Centre (organisation), a youth self-help organisation
- Nerve centre (physiology), a concept in the theory of the reflex activity of the central nervous system

== See also ==
- The principle of the dominant (physiology), formulated by Alexei Alexeyevich Ukhtomsky
