= Attitude object =

Concept around which an attitude is formed and changes over time

An attitude object is any concept or entity around which an attitude forms, integrating both cognition (beliefs) and affect (emotional responses) in a way that shapes how individual evaluate that object. Attitudes toward objects can evolve over time, influenced by various situational and contextual factors. An example of an attitude object is a product (e.g., a car). People can hold various beliefs about cars (cognitions, e.g., that a car is fast) as well as evaluations of those beliefs (affect, e.g., they might like or enjoy that the car is fast). Together these beliefs and affective evaluations of those beliefs represent an attitude toward the object.

Attitude objects also play a significant role in shaping and determining the functions of attitudes, which can be classified as utilitarian, social identity, or self-esteem maintenance functions. The utilitarian function involves attitudes toward objects that provide direct benefits (e.g., coffee or air conditioners), which help maximize rewards or minimize discomfort. As for the social identity function relates to objects (e.g., wedding rings or national flags), which symbolize values and social identity, helping individuals express who they are and their affiliations. Lastly, the self-esteem maintenance function involves objects that impact self-worth (e.g., personal attributes, help boost, and protect one's self-esteem).

== Historical development of attitude object theory ==
The understanding of attitude objects has changed considerable since the early 1900s. Early psychological research treated attitudes as simple evaluations, but later findings suggested that these evaluations depend heavily on the specific object they target. Researchers like Thurstone and Likert were among the first to emphasize the importance of clearly identifying the object of an attitude.

== Factors ==
Attitude towards an object are influenced not only by the characteristics of the object itself (cognitive aspect) but also by the context in which the object is encountered, a concept known as attitude-toward-situation.

The behavior is better predicted when both the attitude-toward-object and attitude-toward-situation are considered. This interaction highlights the significance of the situational context alongside of the object in shaping attitudes and determining behavior. For instance, the study showed that an individual's behavior is influenced by their attitude toward both a particular professor and their general view of attending classes, illustrating the combined impact of object and situational attitudes. A real-world example for this illustration is that a student's attitude toward a specific professor (attitude-toward-object) and their general view on attending classes (attitude-toward-situation) interact to influence their behavior in an academic setting, illustrating how both situational and object-based attitudes collectively impact decisions.

== Role in attitude change theories ==
Attitude objects are central to attitude change theories as well. For instance, the action-based model of dissonance describes how conflicting beliefs about an attitude object can create a state of dissonance, which leads to efforts to align one's attitudes and reduce discomfort.This theory highlights how attitude objects, particularly those tied to strong beliefs or values, can drive efforts to resolve inconsistencies and achieve a sense of internal harmony.

== Summary ==
Attitude objects are pivotal in the formation and function of attitudes, influencing how individuals evaluate and interact with the world around them. By shaping utilitarian, social identity, and self-esteem maintenance functions, attitude objects impact both personal and social behaviors. Considering both the context and object-based elements of attitudes, especially in complex scenarios where an object may serve multiple functions, enriches our understanding of human behavior and attitude change.

== See also ==
- Attitude (psychology) - The terms of attitude, attitude objects, and attitude formation
