= Attitude (psychology) =

Concept in psychology and communication studies

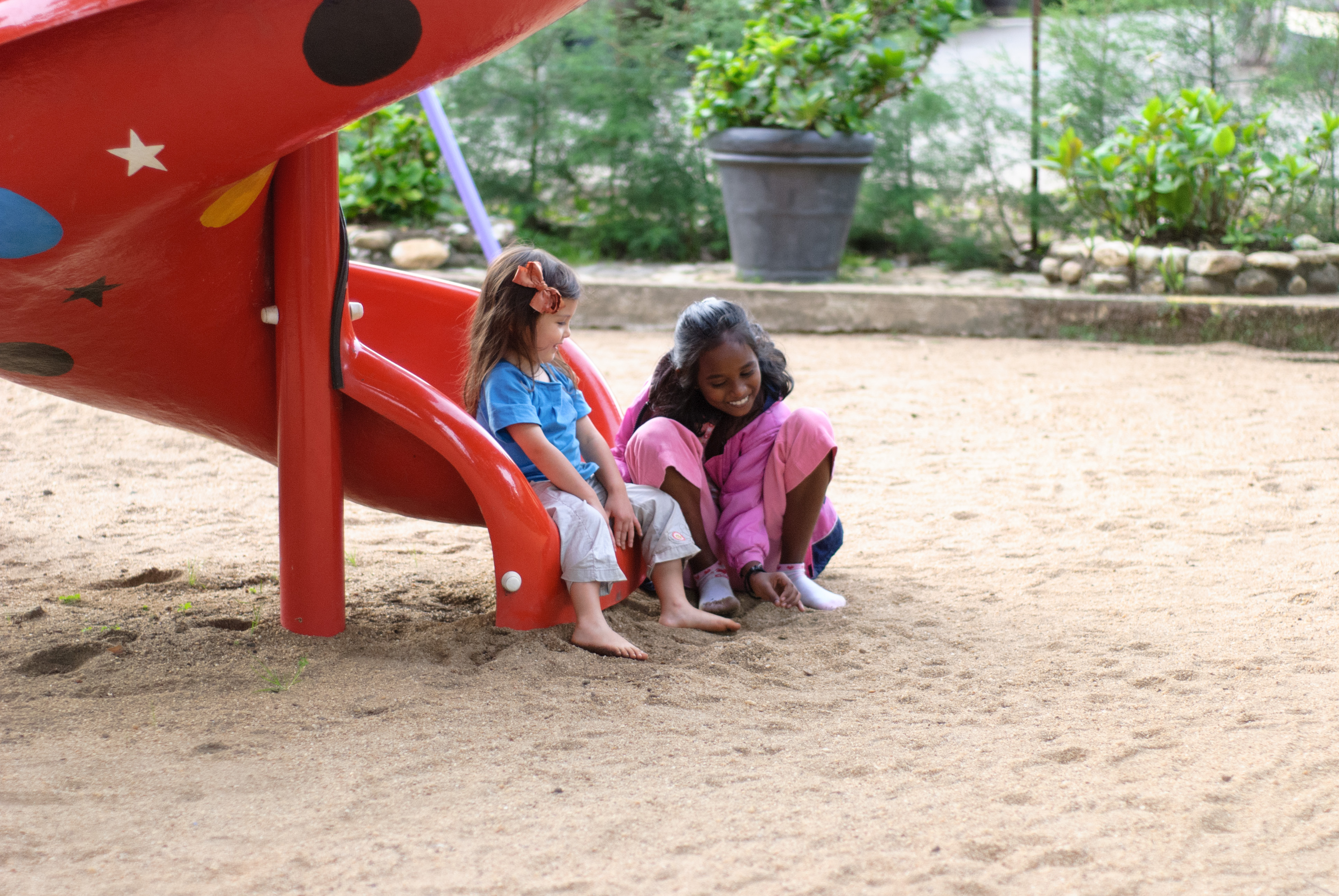
Two children at a playground talking and demonstrating a positive attitude

In psychology, an attitude "is a summary evaluation of an object of thought. An attitude object can be anything a person discriminates or holds in mind". Attitudes include beliefs (cognition), emotional responses (affect) and behavioral tendencies (intentions, motivations). In the classical definition an attitude is persistent, while in more contemporary conceptualizations, attitudes may vary depending upon situations, context, or moods.

While different researchers have defined attitudes in various ways, and may use different terms for the same concepts or the same term for different concepts, two essential attitude functions emerge from empirical research. For individuals, attitudes are cognitive schema that provide a structure to organize complex or ambiguous information, guiding particular evaluations or behaviors. More abstractly, attitudes serve higher psychological needs: expressive or symbolic functions (affirming values), maintaining social identity, and regulating emotions. Attitudes influence behavior at individual, interpersonal, and societal levels. Attitudes are complex and are acquired through life experience and socialization. Key topics in the study of attitudes include attitude strength, attitude change, and attitude-behavior relationships. The decades-long interest in attitude research is due to the interest in pursuing individual and social goals, an example being the public health campaigns to reduce cigarette smoking.

== Definitions ==
The term attitude with the psychological meaning of an internal state of preparedness for action was not used until the 19th century.

The American Psychological Association (APA) defines attitude as "a relatively enduring and general evaluation of an object, person, group, issue, or concept on a dimension ranging from negative to positive. Attitudes provide summary evaluations of target objects and are often assumed to be derived from specific beliefs, emotions, and past behaviors associated with those objects."

For much of the 20th century, the empirical study of attitudes was at the core of social psychology. Attitudes can be derived from affective information (feelings), cognitive information (beliefs), and behavioral information (experiences), often predicting subsequent behavior. Alice H. Eagly and Shelly Chaiken, for example, define an attitude as "a psychological tendency that is expressed by evaluating a particular entity with some degree of favor or disfavor."

Though it is sometimes common to define an attitude as affect toward an object, affect (i.e., discrete emotions or overall arousal) is generally understood as an evaluative structure used to form an attitude object. Attitude may influence the attention to attitude objects, the use of categories for encoding information and the interpretation, judgement and recall of attitude-relevant information. These influences tend to be more powerful for strong attitudes which are accessible and based on elaborate supportive knowledge structure. The durability and impact of influence depend upon the strength formed from the consistency of heuristics. Attitudes can guide encoding information, attention and behaviors, even if the individual is pursuing unrelated goals.

Past research reflected the traditional notion that attitudes are simple tendencies to like or dislike attitude objects, while contemporary research has begun to adopt more complex perspectives. Recent advances on the mental structure of attitudes have suggested that attitudes (and their components) might not always be simply positive or negative, but may include both positivity and negativity. In addition, strong and weak attitudes are associated with many different outcomes. Methodological advances have allowed researchers to consider with greater precision the existence and implications of possessing implicit (unconscious) and explicit (conscious) attitudes.

A sociological approach relates attitudes to concepts of values and ideologies that conceptualize the relationship of thought to action at higher levels of analysis. Values represent the social goals which are used by individuals to orient their behaviors. Cross-cultural studies seek to understand cultural differences in terms of differences in values. For example, the individualism-collectivism dimension suggests that Western and Eastern societies differ fundamentally in the priority given to individual vs. group goals. Ideologies represent more generalized orientations that seek to make sense of related attitudes and values, and are the basis for moral judgements.

Most contemporary perspectives on attitudes permit that people can also be conflicted or ambivalent toward an object by holding both positive and negative beliefs or feelings toward the same object. Attitude is often interpreted as to more directly influence the intention to act, not behavior itself. Several additional factors weaken the correlation between attitude and behaviour.

Explicit measures are of attitudes at the conscious level that are deliberately formed and easy to self-report. Implicit measures are of attitudes at an unconscious level, that function out of awareness. Both explicit and implicit attitudes can shape an individual's behavior. Implicit attitudes, however, are most likely to affect behavior when the demands are steep and an individual feels stressed or distracted.

== Measurement ==
An attitude is a latent psychological construct, which consequently can only be measured indirectly. Commonly used measures include Likert scales which records agreement or disagreement with a series of belief statements. The semantic differential uses bipolar adjectives to measure the meaning associated with attitude objects. The Guttman scale focuses on items that vary in their degree of psychological difficulty. Supplementing these are several techniques that do not depend on deliberate responses such as unobtrusive, standard physiological, and neuroscientific measures. Following the explicit-implicit dichotomy, attitudes can be examined different measures.

=== Explicit ===
Explicit measures tend to rely on self-reports or easily observed behaviors. These tend to involve bipolar scales (e.g., good-bad, favorable-unfavorable, support-oppose, etc.). Explicit measures can also be used by measuring the straightforward attribution of characteristics to nominate groups. Explicit attitudes that develop in response to recent information, automatic evaluation were thought to reflect mental associations through early socialization experiences. Once formed, these associations are highly robust and resistant to change, as well as stable across both context and time. Hence the impact of contextual influences was assumed to be obfuscate assessment of a person's "true" and enduring evaluative disposition as well as limit the capacity to predict subsequent behavior.

=== Implicit ===
Implicit measures are not consciously directed and are assumed to be automatic, which may make implicit measures more valid and reliable than explicit measures (such as self-reports). For example, people can be motivated such that they find it socially desirable to appear to have certain attitudes. An example of this is that people can hold implicit prejudicial attitudes, but express explicit attitudes that report little prejudice. Implicit measures help account for these situations and look at attitudes that a person may not be aware of or want to show. Implicit measures therefore usually rely on an indirect measure of attitude. For example, the Implicit Association Test (IAT) examines the strength between the target concept and an attribute element by considering the latency in which a person can examine two response keys when each has two meanings. With little time to carefully examine what the participant is doing they respond according to internal keys. This priming can show attitudes the person has about a particular object. People are often unwilling to provide responses perceived as socially undesirable and therefore tend to report what they think their attitudes should be rather than what they know them to be. More complicated still, people may not even be consciously aware that they hold biased attitudes. Over the past few decades, scientists have developed several measures to avoid these unconscious biases.

== Structure ==
=== Intra-attitudinal and inter-attitudinal structures ===
There is also considerable interest in intra-attitudinal and inter-attitudinal structure, which is how an attitude is made (expectancy and value) and how different attitudes relate to one another. Intra-attitudinal structures are how underlying attitudes are consistent with one another. The intra-attitudinal structure also follows the ABC model. Intra-attitudinal follows the ABC model by examining each part of the model. This connects different attitudes to one another and to more underlying psychological structures, such as values or ideology. Unlike intra-attitudinal structures, inter-attitudinal structures involve the strength of relations of more than one attitude within a network.

=== Components ===
The classic, tripartite view offered by Rosenberg and Hovland in 1960 is that an attitude contains cognitive, affective, and behavioral components. Empirical research, however, fails to support clear distinctions between thoughts, emotions, and behavioral intentions associated with a particular attitude. A criticism of the tripartite view of attitudes is that it requires cognitive, affective, and behavioral associations of an attitude to be consistent, but this may be implausible. Thus some views of attitude structure see the cognitive and behavioral components as derivative of affect or affect and behavior as derivative of underlying beliefs. "The cognitive component refers to the beliefs, thoughts, and attributes associated with an object". "The affective component refers to feelings or emotions linked to an attitude object". "The behavioral component refers to behaviors or experiences regarding an attitude object".

An influential model of attitude is the multi-component model, where attitudes are evaluations of an object that have affective (relating to moods and feelings), behavioral, and cognitive components (the ABC model). The affective component of attitudes refers to feelings or emotions linked to an attitude object. Affective responses influence attitudes in a number of ways. For example, many people are afraid or scared of spiders. So this negative affective response is likely to cause someone to have a negative attitude towards spiders. The behavioral component of attitudes refers to the way an attitude influences how a person acts or behaves. The cognitive component of attitudes refers to the beliefs, thoughts, and attributes that a person associates with an object. Many times a person's attitude might be based on the negative and positive attributes they associate with an object. As a result of assigning negative or positive attributes to a person, place, or object, individuals may behave negatively or positively towards them.

==== Beliefs ====
Beliefs are cognitive states about the world—subjective probabilities that an object has a particular attribute or that an action will lead to a particular outcome. Beliefs can be patently and unequivocally false. For example, surveys show that a third of U.S. adults think that vaccines cause autism, despite the preponderance of scientific research to the contrary. It was found that beliefs like these are tenaciously held and are highly resistant to change. Another important factor that affects attitude is symbolic interactionism, these are rife with powerful symbols and charged with affect which can lead to a selective perception. Persuasion theories say that in politics, successful persuaders convince its message recipients into a selective perception or attitude polarization for turning against the opposite candidate through a repetitive process that they are in a noncommittal state and it is unacceptable and does not have any moral basis for it and for this they only require to chain the persuading message into a realm of plausibility.

Despite debate about the particular structure of attitudes, there is considerable evidence that attitudes reflect more than evaluations of a particular object that vary from positive to negative.

==== Behaviors ====
The effects of attitudes on behaviors is a growing research enterprise within psychology. Icek Ajzen has led research and helped develop two prominent theoretical approaches within this field: the theory of reasoned action and, its theoretical descendant, the theory of planned behavior. Both theories help explain the link between attitude and behavior as a controlled and deliberative process.

=== Models ===
==== Theory of reasoned action ====
The theory of reasoned action (TRA) is a model for the prediction of behavioral intention, spanning predictions of attitude and predictions of behavior. The theory of reasoned action was developed by Martin Fishbein and Icek Ajzen, derived from previous research that started out as the theory of attitude, which led to the study of attitude and behavior.

==== Theory of planned behavior ====
The theory of planned behavior suggests that behaviors are primarily influenced by the attitude and other intentions. The theory of planned behavior was proposed by Icek Ajzen in 1985 through his article "From intentions to actions: A theory of planned behavior." The theory was developed from the theory of reasoned action, which was proposed by Martin Fishbein together with Icek Ajzen in 1975. The theory of reasoned action was in turn grounded in various theories of attitude such as learning theories, expectancy-value theories, consistency theories, and attribution theory. According to the theory of reasoned action, if people evaluate the suggested behavior as positive (attitude), and if they think their significant others want them to perform the behavior (subjective norm), this results in a higher intention (motivation) and they are more likely to do so. A high correlation of attitudes and subjective norms to behavioral intention, and subsequently to behavior, has been confirmed in many studies. The theory of planned behavior contains the same component as the theory of reasoned action, but adds the component of perceived behavioral control to account for barriers outside one's own control.

==== Motivation and Opportunity as Determinants (MODE) ====
Russell H. Fazio proposed an alternative theory called "Motivation and Opportunity as Determinants" or MODE. Fazio believes that because there is deliberative process happening, individuals must be motivated to reflect on their attitudes and subsequent behaviors. Simply put, when an attitude is automatically activated, the individual must be motivated to avoid making an invalid judgement as well as have the opportunity to reflect on their attitude and behavior.

The MODE (motivation and opportunity as determinants of the attitude-behavior relation) model was developed by Fazio. The MODE model, in short is a theory of attitude evaluation that attempts to predict and explain behavioral outcomes of attitudes. When both are present, behavior will be deliberate. When one is absent, impact on behavior will be spontaneous. A person's attitude can be measured explicitly and implicitly. The model suggests whether attitude activation occurs and, therefore, whether selective perception occurs depends on attitude accessibility. More accessible attitudes are more likely to be activated in a behavioral situation and, therefore, are more likely to influence perceptions and behavior

A counter-argument against the high relationship between behavioral intention and actual behavior has also been proposed, as the results of some studies show that, because of circumstantial limitations, behavioral intention does not always lead to actual behavior. Namely, since behavioral intention cannot be the exclusive determinant of behavior where an individual's control over the behavior is incomplete, Ajzen introduced the theory of planned behavior by adding a new component, "perceived behavioral control." By this, he extended the theory of reasoned action to cover non-volitional behaviors for predicting behavioral intention and actual behavior.

== Function ==
Another classic view of attitudes is that attitudes serve particular functions for individuals. That is, researchers have tried to understand why individuals hold particular attitudes or why they hold attitudes in general by considering how attitudes affect the individuals who hold them. Daniel Katz, for example, writes that attitudes can serve "instrumental, adjustive or utilitarian," "ego-defensive," "value-expressive," or "knowledge" functions. This functional attitude theory suggests that in order for attitudes to change (e.g., via persuasion), appeals must be made to the function(s) that a particular attitude serves for the individual. As an example, the ego-defensive function might be used to influence the racially prejudicial attitudes of an individual who sees themselves as open-minded and tolerant. By appealing to that individual's image of themselves as tolerant and open-minded, it may be possible to change their prejudicial attitudes to be more consistent with their self-concept. Similarly, a persuasive message that threatens self-image is much more likely to be rejected.

Daniel Katz classified attitudes into four different groups based on their functions.

1. Utilitarian: provides general approach or avoidance tendencies
2. Knowledge: organizes and interprets new information
3. Ego-defensive: protects self-esteem
4. Value-expressive: expresses central values or beliefs

=== Utilitarian ===
People adopt attitudes that are rewarding and that help them avoid punishment. In other words, any attitude that is adopted in a person's own self-interest is considered to serve a utilitarian function. For example, a person who has a condo would pay property taxes. If that leads to an attitude that "increases in property taxes are bad", then the attitude is serving a utilitarian function.

=== Knowledge ===
Several studies have shown that knowledge increases are associated with heightened attitudes that influence behavior. The framework for knowledge is based on significant values and general principles. Attitudes achieve this goal by making things fit together and make sense. As a result, people can maintain a sense of stability and meaning within their worldview. For example:

1. I believe that I am a good person.
2. I believe that good things happen to good people.
3. Something bad happens to Bob.
4. So, I believe Bob must not be a good person.

When a person is relying on a single dimension of knowledge and that dimension is not directly related to their behavior goal, that person might conclude that the attitude is wrong.

=== Ego-Defensive ===
This function involves psychoanalytic principles where people use defense mechanisms to protect themselves from psychological harm. Mechanisms include denial, repression, projection, and rationalization.

The ego-defensive notion correlates with Downward Comparison Theory, which argues that derogating a less fortunate other increases a person's own subjective well-being. A person is more likely to use the ego-defensive function when they suffer a frustration or misfortune.

=== Value-Expressive ===
Identity and social approval are established by central values that reveal who we are and what we stand for. Individuals define and interpret situations based on their central values. An example would be attitudes toward a controversial political issue.

== Formation ==
According to Doob in 1947, learning can account for most of the attitudes a person holds. The study of attitude formation is the study of how people form evaluations of persons, places or things. Theories of classical conditioning, instrumental conditioning and social learning are mainly responsible for formation of attitude. Unlike personality, attitudes are expected to change as a function of experience. In addition, exposure to the 'attitude' objects may have an effect on how a person forms his or her attitude. This concept was seen as the mere-exposure effect. Robert Zajonc showed that people were more likely to have a positive attitude on 'attitude objects' when they were exposed to it frequently than if they were not. Mere repeated exposure of the individual to a stimulus is a sufficient condition for the enhancement of his attitude toward it. Tesser in 1993 argued that hereditary variables may affect attitudes - but believes that they do so indirectly. For example, consistency theories, which imply that beliefs and values must be consistent. As with any type of heritability, to determine if a particular trait has a basis in genetics, twin studies are used. The most famous example of such a theory is Dissonance-reduction theory, associated with Leon Festinger, which explains that when the components of an attitude (including belief and behavior) are at odds an individual may adjust one to match the other (for example, adjusting a belief to match a behavior). Other theories include balance theory, originally proposed by Heider in 1958, and the self-perception theory, originally proposed by Daryl Bem.

== Change ==
Attitudes can be changed through persuasion and an important domain of research on attitude change focuses on responses to communication. Experimental research into the factors that can affect the persuasiveness of a message include:

- Target characteristics: These are characteristics that refer to the person who receives and processes a message. One such trait is intelligence - it seems that more intelligent people are less easily persuaded by one-sided messages. Another variable that has been studied in this category is self-esteem. Although it is sometimes thought that those higher in self-esteem are less easily persuaded, there is some evidence that the relationship between self-esteem and persuasibility is actually curvilinear, with people of moderate self-esteem being more easily persuaded than both those of high and low self-esteem levels.
- Source characteristics: The major source characteristics are expertise, trustworthiness and interpersonal attraction or attractiveness. The credibility of a perceived message has been found to be a key variable here; if one reads a report about health and believes it came from a professional medical journal, one may be more easily persuaded than if one believes it is from a popular newspaper. Some psychologists have debated whether this is a long-lasting effect and Hovland and Weiss found the effect of telling people that a message came from a credible source disappeared after several weeks (the so-called sleeper effect). Whether there is a sleeper effect is controversial. Perceived wisdom is that if people are informed of the source of a message before hearing it, there is less likelihood of a sleeper effect than if they are told a message and then told its source.
- Message Characteristics: The nature of the message plays a role in persuasion. Sometimes presenting both sides of a story is useful to help change attitudes. When people are not motivated to process the message, simply the number of arguments presented in a persuasive message will influence attitude change, such that a greater number of arguments will produce greater attitude change.

=== Emotion and attitude change ===
Emotion is a common component in persuasion, social influence, and attitude change. Much of attitude research emphasized the importance of affective or emotion components. Emotion works hand-in-hand with the cognitive, or thought, process about an issue or situation. Emotional appeals are commonly found in advertising, health campaigns and political messages. Recent examples include no-smoking health campaigns and political campaign advertising emphasizing the fear of terrorism. Attitudes and attitude objects are functions of cognitive, affective and cognitive components. Attitudes are part of the brain's associative networks, the spider-like structures residing in long-term memory that consist of affective and cognitive nodes.

By activating an affective or emotion node, attitude change may be possible, though affective and cognitive components tend to be intertwined. One may be able to change their attitudes with attitude correctness, which varies with the level of confidence they have in their attitude validity and accuracy. In general, the higher the confidence level, the more the person believes others around them should share the same attitude. As we learn other people share those attitudes and how socially acceptable, they are, the importance of attitude correctness becomes even more apparent. Our attitudes can greatly impact our behavior and the manner of how we treat those around us. In primarily affective networks, it is more difficult to produce cognitive counterarguments in the resistance to persuasion and attitude change. The idea of attitude clarity refers to a feeling of security or uncertainty about a particular attitude, a feeling strengthened by the act of reporting one's particular attitude towards an issue or thing, which will make that attitude more crystallized.

Affective forecasting, otherwise known as intuition or the prediction of emotion, also impacts attitude change. Research suggests that predicting emotions is an important component of decision making, in addition to the cognitive processes. How a person feels about an outcome may override purely cognitive rationales.

In terms of research methodology, the challenge for researchers is measuring emotion and subsequent impacts on attitude. Various models and measurement tools have been constructed to obtain emotion and attitude information. Measures may include the use of physiological cues like facial expressions, vocal changes, and other body rate measures. For instance, fear is associated with raised eyebrows, increased heart rate and increase body tension. Other methods include concept or network mapping and using primes or word cues in the era.

=== Components of emotional appeals ===
Any discrete emotion can be used in a persuasive appeal; this may include jealousy, disgust, indignation, fear, blue, disturbed, haunted, and anger. Fear is one of the most studied emotional appeals in communication and social influence research.

Important consequences of fear appeals and other emotional appeals include the possibility of reactance which may lead to either message rejections or source rejection and the absence of attitude change. As the EPPM suggests, there is an optimal emotion level in motivating attitude change. If there is not enough motivation, an attitude will not change; if the emotional appeal is overdone, the motivation can be paralyzed thereby preventing attitude change.

Emotions perceived as negative or containing threat are often studied more than perceived positive emotions like humor. Though the inner-workings of humor are not agreed upon, humor appeals may work by creating incongruities in the mind. Recent research has looked at the impact of humor on the processing of political messages. While evidence is inconclusive, there appears to be potential for targeted attitude change is receivers with low political message involvement.

Important factors that influence the impact of emotional appeals include self-efficacy, attitude accessibility, issue involvement, and message/source features. Self efficacy is a person's perception of their agency or ability to deal with a situation. It is an important variable in emotional appeal messages because it dictates a person's ability to deal with both the emotion and the situation. For example, if a person is not self-efficacious about their ability to impact the global environment, they are not likely to change their attitude or behavior about global warming.

Dillard in 1994 suggested that message features such as source non-verbal communication, message content, and receiver differences can impact the emotion impact of fear appeals. The characteristics of a message are important because one message can elicit different levels of emotion for different people. Thus, in terms of emotional appeals messages, one size does not fit all.

Attitude accessibility refers to the activation of an attitude from memory in other words, how readily available is an attitude about an object, issue, or situation. Issue involvement is the relevance and salience of an issue or situation to an individual. Issue involvement has been correlated with both attitude access and attitude strength. Past studies conclude accessible attitudes are more resistant to change.

== See also ==
- Alexei Ukhtomsky – Russian physiologist
- Attitude polarization
- Belief – Subjective attitude that something is true
- Cognitive dissonance – Mental phenomenon of holding contradictory beliefs
- Dimitri Uznadze
- Elaboration likelihood model – Dual process theory of persuasion
- Expectancy-value theory – Behavioral theory
- Ludwig Lange – German physicist
- Propositional attitude – Concept in epistemology
- Sergei Rubinstein – Soviet psychologist and philosopher (1889–1960)
- Teenage rebellion – Developmental process for adolescents to become independent
- Theory of planned behaviour
- Theory of reasoned action – Psychological theory
