= Fear of negative evaluation =

Psychological construct

Fear of negative evaluation (FNE), or fear of failure, also known as atychiphobia, is a psychological construct reflecting "apprehension about others' evaluations, distress over negative evaluations by others, and the expectation that others would evaluate one negatively". The construct and a psychological test to measure it were defined by David Watson and Ronald Friend in 1969. FNE is related to specific personality dimensions, such as anxiousness, submissiveness, and social avoidance. People who score high on the FNE scale are highly concerned with seeking social approval or avoiding disapproval by others and may tend to avoid situations where they have to undergo evaluations. High FNE subjects are also more responsive to situational factors. This has been associated with conformity, pro-social behavior, and social anxiety.

== Test ==
The original Fear of Negative Evaluation test consists of thirty items with a sentence that was response format and takes approximately ten minutes to complete. Scale scores range from 0 (low FNE) to 30 (high FNE). In 1983, Mark Leary presented a brief version of the FNE consisting of twelve original questions on a 5-point Likert scale (BFNE). Scale scores range from 12 (low FNE) to 60 (high FNE).

=== Reliability ===
Both the original thirty-item and the brief twelve-item FNE test have been demonstrated to have high internal consistency. The original and brief versions correlate very closely.

=== Validity ===
FNE does not correlate strongly with other measures of social apprehension, as such as the SAD PERSONS scale and the Interaction Anxiousness Scale.

== Social anxiety ==
Social anxiety is, in part, a response to perceived negative evaluation by others. Whereas FNE is related to the dread of being evaluated unfavorably when participating in a social situation, social anxiety is defined as a purely emotional reaction to this type of social situation. When patients with social phobia evaluate their relationships, they are extremely fearful of negative evaluation and express high degrees of FNE. As discussed by Deborah Roth Ledley, subjects in a study were asked to give a speech after completing a dot-probe paradigm task. After being presented with negative faces, low FNE participants did not display any increased apprehension, whereas high FNE participants displayed more apprehension.

FNE is a direct cause of eating disorders caused by social anxieties (i.e., the fear of being negatively evaluated upon appearance). It ranks higher than depression and social comparison in causes of eating disorders. This is because FNE is the foundation for bulimic attitudes and body dissatisfaction.

== Heritability ==
FNE has been suggested to have some genetic component, as are other personality characteristics such as trait anxiousness, submissiveness, and social avoidance. Brief Fear of Negative Evaluation Scale (BFNE) scores have been found to have a genetic component in twin studies. In addition, BFNE scores and the Dimensional Assessment of Personality Pathology-Basic Questionnaire are genetically correlated. It has been suggested that the genes that influence negative evaluation fears affect a range of anxiety-related personality behaviors.

== Judgment and perception ==
Winton, Clark and Edelmann (1995) found that individuals who score higher on the FNE are more accurate at identifying negative expressions. Individuals who score higher on the FNE were also found to overestimate negative social characteristics (e.g., awkwardness, long gaps in speech) and underestimate positive social characteristics (e.g., confidence, self-assurance) they exhibit during public speaking. Low-FNE speakers overestimate their effectiveness in public speaking. In contrast, high-FNE speakers were more effective in their communication, consistent with the listener's actual understanding. In the athletic arena, low-FNE basketball players were able to withstand higher levels of pressure and continue to maintain performance levels, whereas high-FNE basketball players showed a significant decrease in performance under pressure.

== See also ==
- Affect (psychology)
- Behavioural genetics
- Body image
- Cognitive psychology
- Performance anxiety
- Social anxiety
- Social phobia
- Social rejection § Rejection sensitivity
- Test anxiety
