= Social rejection =

Exclusion of someone from social relations

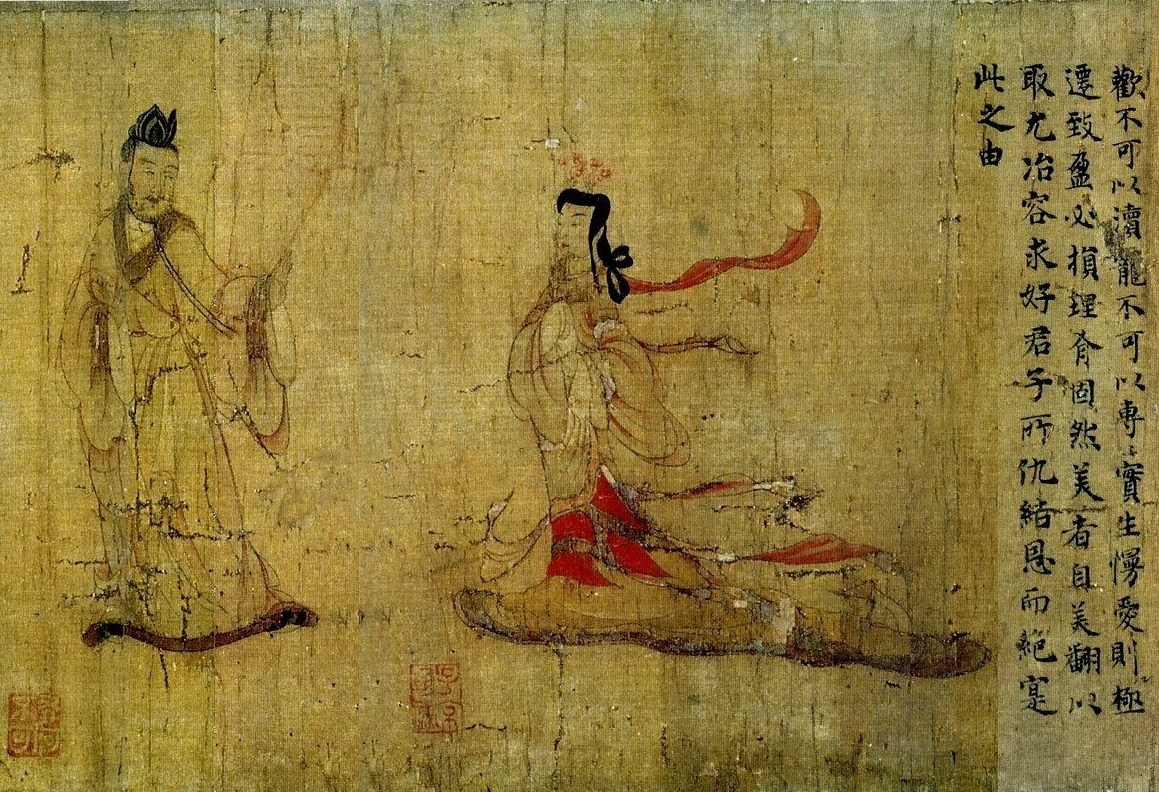
This scene of the Admonitions Scroll shows an emperor turning away from his consort, his hand raised in a gesture of rejection and with a look of disdain on his face.

Social rejection occurs when an individual is deliberately or accidentally excluded from a social relationship or social interaction. The topic includes interpersonal rejection (or peer rejection), romantic rejection, and familial estrangement. A person can be rejected or shunned by individuals or an entire group of people. Furthermore, rejection can be either active by bullying, teasing, or ridiculing, or passive by ignoring a person, or giving the "silent treatment". The experience of being rejected is subjective for the recipient, and it can be perceived when it is not actually present. The word "ostracism" is also commonly used to denote a process of social exclusion (in Ancient Greece, ostracism was a form of temporary banishment following people's vote).

Although humans are social beings, some level of rejection is an inevitable part of life. Nevertheless, rejection can become a problem when it is prolonged or consistent, when the relationship is important, or when the individual is highly sensitive to rejection. Rejection by an entire group of people can have especially negative effects, particularly when it results in social isolation.

The experience of rejection can lead to a number of adverse psychological consequences such as loneliness, low self-esteem, aggression, depression, and nightmares. It can also lead to feelings of insecurity and a heightened sensitivity to future rejection.

== Need for acceptance ==
Social rejection may be emotionally painful, due to the social nature of human beings, as well as the essential need for social interaction between other humans. Abraham Maslow and other theorists have suggested that the need for love and belongingness is a fundamental human motivation. According to Maslow, all humans, even introverts, need to be able to give and receive affection to be psychologically healthy.

Psychologists believe that simple contact or social interaction with others is not enough to fulfill this need. Instead, people have a strong motivational drive to form and maintain caring interpersonal relationships. People need both stable relationships and satisfying interactions with the people in those relationships. If either of these two ingredients is missing, people will begin to feel lonely and unhappy. Thus, rejection is a significant threat. In fact, the majority of human anxieties appear to reflect concerns over social exclusion.

Being a member of a group is also important for social identity, which is a key component of the self-concept. Mark Leary of Duke University has suggested that the main purpose of self-esteem is to monitor social relations and detect social rejection. In this view, self-esteem is a sociometer which activates negative emotions when signs of exclusion appear.

Social psychological research confirms the motivational basis of the need for acceptance. Specifically, fear of rejection leads to conformity to peer pressure (sometimes called normative influence, cf. informational influence), and compliance to the demands of others. The need for affiliation and social interaction appears to be particularly strong under stress.

== In childhood ==
Peer rejection has been measured using sociometry and other rating methods. Studies typically show that some children are popular, receiving generally high ratings, many children are in the middle, with moderate ratings, and a minority of children are rejected, showing generally low ratings. One measure of rejection asks children to list peers they like and dislike. Rejected children receive few "like" nominations and many "dislike" nominations. Children classified as neglected receive few nominations of either type.

According to Karen Bierman of Pennsylvania State University, most children who are rejected by their peers display one or more of the following behavior patterns:

- Low rates of prosocial behavior, e.g. taking turns, sharing
- High rates of aggressive or disruptive behavior
- High rates of inattentive, immature, or impulsive behavior
- High rates of social anxiety

Bierman states that well-liked children show social savvy and know when and how to join play groups. Children who are at risk for rejection are more likely to barge in disruptively, or hang back without joining at all. Aggressive children who are athletic or have good social skills are likely to be accepted by peers, and they may become ringleaders in the harassment of less skilled children. Minority children, children with disabilities, or children who have unusual characteristics or behavior may face greater risks of rejection. Depending on the norms of the peer group, sometimes even minor differences among children lead to rejection or neglect. Children who are less outgoing or simply prefer solitary play are less likely to be rejected than children who are socially inhibited and show signs of insecurity or anxiety.

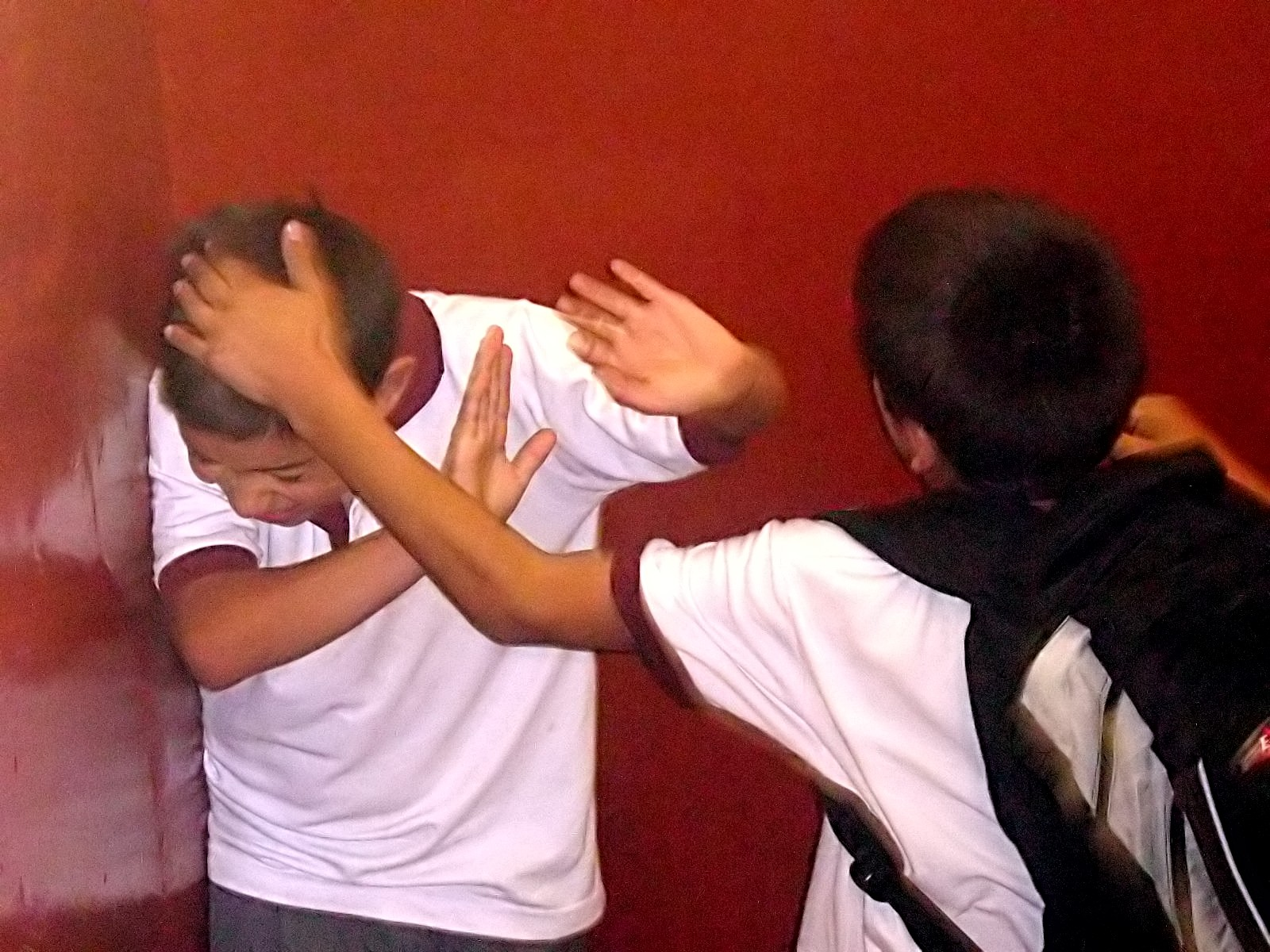
Rejected children are more likely to be bullied at school and on playgrounds

Peer rejection, once established, tends to be stable over time, and thus is difficult for a child to overcome. Researchers have found that active rejection is more stable, more harmful, and more likely to persist after a child transfers to another school, than simple neglect. One reason for this is that peer groups establish reputational biases that act as stereotypes and influence subsequent social interaction. Thus, even when rejected and popular children show similar behavior and accomplishments, popular children are treated much more favorably.

Rejected children are likely to have lower self-esteem, and to be at greater risk for internalizing problems like depression. Some rejected children display externalizing behavior and show aggression rather than depression. The research is largely correlational, but there is evidence of reciprocal effects. This means that children with problems are more likely to be rejected, and this rejection then leads to even greater problems for them. Chronic peer rejection may lead to a negative developmental cycle that worsens with time.

Rejected children are more likely to be bullied and to have fewer friends than popular children, but these conditions are not always present. For example, some popular children do not have close friends, whereas some rejected children do. Peer rejection is believed to be less damaging for children with at least one close friend.

An analysis of 15 school shootings between 1995 and 2001 found that peer rejection was present in all but two of the cases (87%). The documented rejection experiences included both acute and chronic rejection and frequently took the form of ostracism, bullying, and romantic rejection. The authors stated that although it is likely that the rejection experiences contributed to the school shootings, other factors were also present, such as depression, poor impulse control, and other psychopathology.

There are programs available for helping children who suffer from social rejection. One large scale review of 79 controlled studies found that social skills training is very effective (r = 0.40 effect size), with a 70% success rate, compared to 30% success in control groups. There was a decline in effectiveness over time, however, with follow-up studies showing a somewhat smaller effect size (r = 0.35).

== In the laboratory ==
Laboratory research has found that even short-term rejection from strangers can have powerful (if temporary) effects on an individual. In several social psychology experiments, people chosen at random to receive messages of social exclusion became more aggressive, more willing to cheat, less willing to help others, and more likely to pursue short-term over long-term goals. Rejection appears to lead very rapidly to self-defeating and antisocial behavior.

Researchers have also investigated how the brain responds to social rejection. One study found that the dorsal anterior cingulate cortex is active when people are experiencing both physical pain and "social pain", in response to social rejection. A subsequent experiment, also using fMRI neuroimaging, found that three regions become active when people are exposed to images depicting rejection themes. These areas are the posterior cingulate cortex, the parahippocampal gyrus, and the dorsal anterior cingulate cortex. Furthermore, individuals who are high in rejection sensitivity (see below) show less activity in the left prefrontal cortex and the right dorsal superior frontal gyrus, which may indicate less ability to regulate emotional responses to rejection.

An experiment performed in 2007 at the University of California at Berkeley found that individuals with a combination of low self-esteem and low attentional control are more likely to exhibit eye-blink startle responses while viewing rejection themed images. These findings indicate that people who feel bad about themselves are especially vulnerable to rejection, but that people can also control and regulate their emotional reactions.

A study at Miami University indicated that individuals who recently experienced social rejection were better than both accepted and control participants in their ability to discriminate between genuine and fake smiles. Though both accepted and control participants were better than chance (they did not differ from each other), rejected participants were much better at this task, nearing 80% accuracy. This study is noteworthy in that it is one of the few cases of a positive or adaptive consequence of social rejection.

An early fMRI study proposed that the dACC is active during both physical pain and social exclusion. However, a 2021 meta-analysis of 53 Cyberball fMRI studies (N = 1,817) found no reliable dACC activation, with fewer than 15% of studies reporting dACC peaks, and instead found activity consistent with the default network. A 2024 fMRI study reported that activity in the dACC/vACC, anterior insula, and ventrolateral prefrontal cortex tracked updates to beliefs about how much others value the participant, rather than the responses expected if these regions encoded social pain, suggesting they may support learning from social experience.

=== Ball toss / cyberball experiments ===
A common experimental technique is the "ball toss" paradigm, which was developed by Kipling Williams and his colleagues at Purdue University. This procedure involves a group of three people tossing a ball back and forth. Unbeknownst to the actual participant, two members of the group are working for the experimenter and following a pre-arranged script. In a typical experiment, half of the subjects will be excluded from the activity after a few tosses and never get the ball again. Only a few minutes of this treatment are sufficient to produce negative emotions in the target, including anger and sadness. This effect occurs regardless of self-esteem and other personality differences.

Gender differences have been found in these experiments. In one study, women showed greater nonverbal engagement whereas men disengaged faster and showed face-saving techniques, such as pretending to be uninterested. The researchers concluded that women seek to regain a sense of belonging whereas men are more interested in regaining self-esteem.

A computerized version of the task known as "cyberball" has also been developed and leads to similar results. Cyberball is a virtual ball toss game where the participant is led to believe they are playing with two other participants sitting at computers elsewhere who can toss the ball to either player. The participant is included in the game for the first few minutes, but then excluded by the other players for the remaining three minutes. A significant advantage of the cyberball software is its openness; Williams made the software available to all researchers. In the software, the researcher can adjust the order of throwing the balls, the user's avatar, the background, the availability of chat, the introductory message and much other information. In addition, researchers can obtain the program's latest version by visiting the official website of CYBERBALL 5.0.

This simple and short time period of ostracism has been found to produce significant increases to self-reported levels of anger and sadness, as well as lowering levels of the four needs. These effects have been found even when the participant is ostracised by out-group members, when the out-group member is identified as a despised person such as someone in the Ku Klux Klan, when they know the source of the ostracism is just a computer, and even when being ostracised means they will be financially rewarded and being included would incur a financial cost. People feel rejected even when they know they are playing only against the computer. A recent set of experiments using cyberball demonstrated that rejection impairs willpower or self-regulation. Specifically, people who are rejected are more likely to eat cookies and less likely to drink an unpleasant tasting beverage that they are told is good for them. These experiments also showed that the negative effects of rejection last longer in individuals who are high in social anxiety.

=== Life-alone paradigm ===
Another mainstream research method is the "life alone paradigm", which was first developed by Twenge and other scholars to evoke feelings of rejection by informing subjects of false test results. In contrast to ball toss and cyberball, it focuses on future rejection, i.e. the experience of rejection that participants may potentially experience in the future. Specifically, at the beginning of the experiment, participants complete a personality scale (in the original method, the Eysenck Personality Questionnaire). They are then informed of their results based on their experimental group rather than the real results. Participants in the "rejected" group are told that their test results indicate that they will be alone in the future, regardless of their current state of life. Participants in the "accepted" group will be told they will have a fulfilling relationship. In the control group, participants are told they would encounter some accidents. In this way, the participants' sense of rejection is awakened to take the subsequent measurement. After the experiment, the researcher will explain the results to the participants and apologise.

Scholars point out that this method may cause more harm to the subjects. For example, the participants will likely experience a more severe effect on executive functioning during the test. Therefore, this method faces more significant issue with research ethics and harms than other rejection experiments. Consequently, researchers use this test with caution in experiments and pay attention to the subjects' reactions afterwards.

== Psychology of ostracism ==
Most of the research on the psychology of ostracism has been conducted by the social psychologist Kipling Williams. He and his colleagues have devised a model of ostracism which provides a framework to show the complexity in the varieties of ostracism and the processes of its effects. There he theorises that ostracism can potentially be so harmful that humans have evolved an efficient warning system to immediately detect and respond to it.

In the animal kingdom as well as in primitive human societies, ostracism can lead to death due to the lack of protection benefits and access to sufficient food resources from the group. Living apart from the whole of society also means not having a mate, so being able to detect ostracism would be a highly adaptive response to ensure survival and continuation of the genetic line.

=== Temporal need-threat model ===
The predominant theoretical model of social rejection is the temporal need-threat model proposed by Williams and his colleagues, in which the process of social exclusion is divided into three stages: reflexive, reflective, and resignation. The reflexive stage happens when social rejection first occurs. It is an immediate effect happened on individuals. Then, the reflective stage enters when the individual starts to reflect and cope with social rejection. Finally, if the rejection last for the long term and the individual cannot successfully cope with it, the social rejection would turn to the resignation stage, where the individual is likely to suffer from severe depression and helplessness.

==== Reflexive stage ====
The reflexive stage is the first stage of social rejection and refers to the period immediately after social exclusion has occurred. During this stage, Williams proposed that ostracism uniquely poses a threat to four fundamental human needs; the need to belong, the need for control in social situations, the need to maintain high levels of self-esteem, and the need to have a sense of a meaningful existence. When social rejection is related to the individual's social relationships, the individual's need for belonging and self-esteem is threatened; when it is not associated with it, it is primarily a threat to a sense of control and meaningful existence.

Another challenge that individuals need to face at this stage is the sense of pain. Previous scholars have used neurobiological methods to find that social exclusion, whether intentional or unintentional, evokes pain in individuals. Specifically, neurobiological evidence suggests that social exclusion increases the dorsal anterior cingulate cortex (dACC) activation. This brain region, in turn, is associated with physiological pain in individuals. Notably, the right ventral prefrontal cortex (RVPFC) is also further activated when individuals find that social rejection is intentional; this brain region is associated with the regulation of pain perception, implying that pain perception decreases when individuals understand the source of this social rejection. Further research suggests that personal traits or environmental factors do not affect this pain.

Thus, people are motivated to remove this pain with behaviors aimed at reducing the likelihood of others ostracising them any further and increasing their inclusionary status.

==== Reflective stage ====
In the reflective stage, individuals begin to think about and try to cope with social rejection. In the need-threat model, their response is referred to as need fortification, i.e. the creation of interventions that respond to the needs they are threatened by in the reflective stage. Specifically, when individuals' self-esteem and sense of belonging are threatened, they will try to integrate more into the group. As a result, these rejected individuals develop more pro-social behaviors, such as helping others and giving gifts. In contrast, when their sense of control and meaning is threatened, they show more antisocial behavior, such as verbal abuse, fighting, etc., to prove they are essential.

==== Resignation stage ====
When individuals have been in social rejection for a long time and cannot improve their situation through effective coping, they move to the third stage, resignation, in which they do not try to change the problem they are facing but choose to accept it. In Zadro's interview study, in which she interviewed 28 respondents in a state of chronic rejection, she found that the respondents were depressed, self-deprecating and helpless. This social rejection can significantly impact the physical and psychological health of the individual.

==== Controversy ====
The controversy over temporal need-threat model has focused on whether it enhances or reduces people's perception of pain. DeWall and Baumeister's research suggests that individuals experience a reduction in pain after rejection, a phenomenon they refer to as emotional numbness, which contradicts Williams et al.'s theory that social rejection enhances pain perception. In this regard, Williams suggests that this phenomenon is likely due to differences in the paradigm used in the study, as when using a long-term paradigm such as Life-Alone, individuals do not feel the possibility of rejoining the group, thus creating emotional numbness. This is further supported by Bernstein and Claypool, who found that in separate cyberball and life-alone experiments, stronger stimuli of rejection, such as life-alone, protected people through emotional numbness. In contrast, in the case of minor rejection, such as that in cyberball, the individual's system detects the rejection cue and draws attention to it through a sense of pain.

The neural basis of social pain is also debated. A 2014 fMRI study in which participants experienced painful heat and viewed photos of ex-partners found that both conditions activated overlapping regions, including the dACC, but that the multivariate activity patterns were distinct, leading the authors to conclude that rejection does not simply co-opt pain circuitry.

=== Popularity resurgence ===
There has been recent research into the function of popularity on development, specifically how a transition from ostracization to popularity can potentially reverse the deleterious effects of being socially ostracized. While various theories have been put forth regarding what skills or attributes confer an advantage at obtaining popularity, it appears that individuals who were once popular and subsequently experienced a transient ostracization are often able to employ the same skills that led to their initial popularity to bring about a popularity resurgence.

== Romantic rejection ==
In contrast to the study of childhood rejection, which primarily examines rejection by a group of peers, some researchers focus on the phenomenon of a single individual rejecting another in the context of a romantic relationship. In both teenagers and adults, romantic rejection occurs when a person refuses the romantic advances of another, ignores/avoids or is repulsed by someone who is romantically interested in them, or unilaterally ends an existing relationship. The state of unrequited love is a common experience in youth, but mutual love becomes more typical as people get older.

Romantic rejection is a painful, emotional experience that appears to trigger a response in the caudate nucleus of the brain, and associated dopamine and cortisol activity. Subjectively, rejected individuals experience a range of negative emotions, including frustration, intense anger, jealousy, hate, and eventually, despair and possible long-term major depressive disorder. However, there have been cases where individuals go back and forth between depression and anger.

== Rejection sensitivity ==
Karen Horney was the first theorist to discuss the phenomenon of rejection sensitivity. She suggested that it is a component of the neurotic personality, and that it is a tendency to feel deep anxiety and humiliation at the slightest rebuff. Simply being made to wait, for example, could be viewed as rejection and met with extreme anger and hostility.

Albert Mehrabian developed an early questionnaire measure of rejection sensitivity. Mehrabian suggested that sensitive individuals are reluctant to express opinions, tend to avoid arguments or controversial discussions, are reluctant to make requests or impose on others, are easily hurt by negative feedback from others, and tend to rely too much on familiar others and situations so as to avoid rejection.

A 1996 definition of rejection sensitivity is the tendency to "anxiously expect, readily perceive, and overreact" to social rejection. People differ in their readiness to perceive and react to rejection. The causes of individual differences in rejection sensitivity are not well understood. Because of the association between rejection sensitivity and neuroticism, there is a likely genetic predisposition. Rejection sensitive dysphoria, while not a formal diagnosis, is also a common symptom of attention deficit hyperactivity disorder, estimated to affect most people with ADHD. Rejection sensitivity is also a defining characteristic of borderline personality disorder (BPD), where it manifests as intense fear of abandonment and extreme emotional reactions to perceived rejection or criticism. Others posit that rejection sensitivity stems from early attachment relationships and parental rejection; peer rejection is also thought to play a role. Bullying, an extreme form of peer rejection, is likely connected to later rejection sensitivity. There is no conclusive evidence for any of these theories.

The Adult Rejection Sensitivity Questionnaire (A-RSQ), developed by Kathy R. Berenson and colleagues in 2009, is a self-report instrument designed to measure one's disposition to anxiously expect, readily perceive, and intensely react to rejection. Validation by Innamorati et al. tested various factor models. A 2025 validation in Russia confirmed a two-factor structure (Concern vs. Expectancy). Several studies verified the questionnaire's clinical significance. High scores are strongly associated with rumination, depression, and borderline personality disorder.

Social rejection sensitivity has also been linked to anorexia nervosa. In a systematic review of 47 studies, patients with anorexia nervosa preferentially exhibited attentional bias towards social rejection cues, negative interpretation bias during ambiguous social scenarios, and heightened negative affect during and following rejection based experiences. It has been theorised the drive for thinness may partially function to cope with anticipated or experienced rejection.

== Health effects ==
Social rejection has a large effect on a person's health. Baumeister and Leary originally suggested that an unsatisfied need to belong would inevitably lead to problems in behavior as well as mental and physical health. Corroboration of these assumptions about behavior deficits were seen by John Bowlby in his research. Numerous studies have found that being socially rejected leads to an increase in levels of anxiety. Additionally, the level of depression a person feels as well as the amount they care about their social relationships is directly proportional to the level of rejection they perceive. Rejection affects the emotional health and well being of a person as well. Overall, experiments show that those who have been rejected will suffer from more negative emotions and have fewer positive emotions than those who have been accepted or those who were in neutral or control conditions.

In addition to the emotional response to rejection, there is a large effect on physical health as well. Having poor relationships and being more frequently rejected is predictive of mortality. Also, as long as a decade after a marriage ends, divorced women have higher rates of illness than their non-married or currently married counterparts. In the case of a family estrangement, a core part of the mother's identity may be betrayed by the rejection of an adult child. The chance for reconciliation, however slight, results in an inability to attain closure. The resulting emotional state and societal stigma from the estrangement may harm the psychological and physical health of the parent for the rest of their life.

The immune system tends to be harmed when a person experiences social rejection. This can cause severe problems for those with diseases such as HIV. One study by Cole, Kemeny, and Taylor investigated the differences in the disease progression of HIV-positive gay men who were sensitive to rejection compared to those who were not considered rejection sensitive. The study, which took place over nine years, indicated significantly faster rates of low T helper cells, therefore leading to an earlier AIDS diagnosis. They also found that those patients who were more sensitive to rejection died from the disease an average of two years earlier than their non-rejection sensitive counterparts.

Other aspects of health are also affected by rejection. Both systolic and diastolic blood pressure increase upon imagining a rejection scenario. Those who are socially rejected have an increased likelihood of suffering from tuberculosis, as well as suicide. Rejection and isolation were found to affect levels of pain following an operation as well as other physical forms of pain. MacDonald and Leary theorize that rejection and exclusion cause physical pain because that pain is a warning sign to support human survival. As humans developed into social creatures, social interactions and relationships became necessary for survival, and the physical pain systems already existed within the human body.

== In fiction, film and art ==
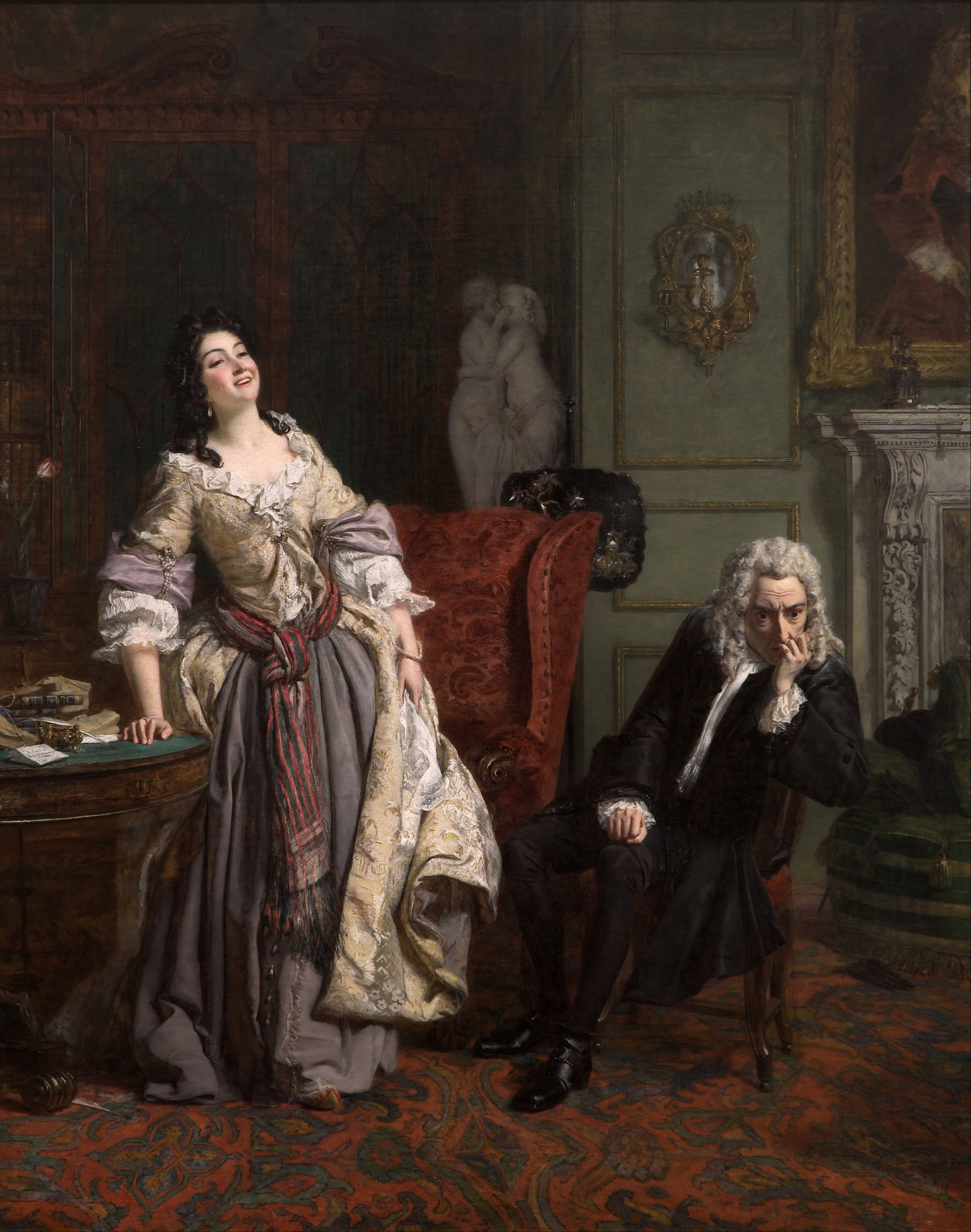
The painting Pope Makes Love To Lady Mary Wortley Montagu by William Powell Frith depicts Lady Mary Wortley Montagu laughingly rejecting Alexander Pope's courtship

Artistic depictions of rejection occur in a variety of art forms. One genre of film that most frequently depicts rejection is romantic comedies. In the film He's Just Not That Into You, the main characters deal with the challenges of reading and misreading human behavior. This presents a fear of rejection in romantic relationships as reflected in this quote by the character Mary, "And now you have to go around checking all these different portals just to get rejected by seven different technologies. It's exhausting."

Social rejection is also depicted in theatrical plays and musicals. For example, the film Hairspray shares the story of Tracy Turnblad, an overweight 15-year-old dancer set in the 1960s. Tracy and her mother are faced with overcoming society's expectations regarding weight and physical appearances.

== See also ==
- Closure (sociology)
- Labelling
- Marginalization
- Outcast
- Parental alienation
- Rejection hotline
- Social defeat
- Social stigma
- Sociometry
