= Functional attitude theory =

Psychology theory

Functional attitude theory (FAT) is a theory in psychology which suggests that beliefs and attitudes are influential to various psychological functions. Attitudes can be influential on many processes such as being utilitarian (useful), social, relating to values, or a reduction of cognitive dissonance. They can be beneficial and help people interact with the world. In the late 1950s when psychoanalysis and behaviorism reigned supreme as the foci of psychological studies, Smith, Bruner, and White (1956) and Katz (1960) separately and independently developed typologies of human attitudes in relation to the functions to which they believed the attitudes served. This theory proposes that attitudes are held by individuals because they are important and integral to psychological functioning. The function of an attitude is more important than whether the attitude is accurate or correct.

== Background ==
Aristotle's Rhetoric, renowned for its modes of persuasion in ethos, logos, and pathos, gave mankind its first recorded guide to and theory of social influence. Aristotle recognized that different appeals are necessary for different types of persuasion, and that these appeals can be tailored and refined to better suit the audience or better suit the product or idea at hand. In the late 1950s when psychoanalysis and behaviorism reigned supreme in the U.S. as the foci of psychological studies, Smith, Bruner, and White (1956) and Katz (1960) separately and independently developed typologies of human attitudes in relation to the functions to which they believed the attitudes served. The goal of these ‘functional attitude theories,’ (FAT) as they would come to be known, was to understand the effect of functional attitudinal states in relation cognition and behavior, and specifically, for Katz (1960), to increase the efficacy of persuasive communications by matching approaches or appeals to the function that the attitude served.

Smith et al. (1956) concentrated on the links between attitudinal states and personality and interviewed ten men regarding their attitude toward the Soviet Union (Carpenter et al., 2013). This logically inductive study was too small to make any binding conclusions, and the study's non-empirical nature meant that it would be dubious as a base for future research, but Smith and colleagues’ foundational theories would go on to inspire and guide future FAT research. Likewise, Katz's (1960) deductive findings did more to explain and define the general concepts of FAT than it did in guiding the methods of future research. In fact, the lack of earlier research on FAT has been linked to both studies’ failure to provide reproducible and falsifiable methods for future research on the theory (Harris & Toledo, 1997; Shavitt & Nelson, 2002). Despite this lack of methodology, both studies contributed to the basic concepts of FAT as it came of age in the 1980s and on.

== Concepts ==
Within FAT, attitudes are considered qualitative variables in relation to the function that they serve. That is, attitudes are the independent variable of a set function (utilitarian, social-adjustive, etc.), which influence both cognition and behavior (dependent variables). Researchers posited that people develop attitudes to serve their goals, and that although any particular attitude might serve multiple functions, it would generally serve one more than the others (Katz, 1960; Smith, Bruner, & White, 1956). They theorized that although two people might have an attitude with exactly the same valence, that attitude might serve very different functions for each person. While different attitudes serve different psychological functions, it is imperative to note that they are not mutually exclusive of one another as similar attitudes may be developed for different reasons by different people; it is the aim of FAT to understand why these attitudes develop to better understand how to influence them (Harris & Toledo, 1997). Though different terminology was employed, both Katz (1960) and Smith et al. (1956) conceptualized similar attitude functions: utilitarian, social-adjustive, value-expressive, ego-defensive, and knowledge. These five traditional functional attitudes are defined briefly below, followed by a synthesis of recent "neofunctional" FAT studies, and a brief critique of FAT.

Utilitarian attitudes

Many attitudes serve a utilitarian function by serving to amplify rewards and minimize the punishments attained from objects in the environment (Katz 1960, Smith et al., 1956). The models of utilitarian attitudes are consequentialist theories: that which creates right acts is their consequences (Miller, 1990). It refers to theories of right action whereas the right act to choose in any situation is the one that will achieve the highest balance of pleasure over pain for all affected beings. When no act is available to which will produce net pleasure, the act which is right will produce the least net pain. As an example, one's attitude toward ice cream may serve a utilitarian function because it is likely to be based on the reward (e.g., enjoyable taste) and punishments (e.g., weight gain) associated with ice cream and to guide behavior that maxims benefits while minimizing costs (e.g., eating low-fat ice cream) (Shavitt & Nelson, 2002). Based in human beings' need to discriminate between objects that produce pleasure and increase task efficiency and those that produce pain and decrease task efficiency, utilitarian functions aid in increasing utility (Carpenter et al., 2013). An individual with a utilitarian attitude is concerned with how an object will assist in improving their quality of life. In terms of products, any T-shirt could be considered utilitarian in terms of its ability to provide comfort and some shelter for an individual.

Social-adjustive attitudes

Social-adjustive functions are those which regulate relationships and enable individuals to climb the social ladder through outward displays of status which are theorized to make the individual more attractive or popular in the eyes of valued groups. An individual with a social-adjustive attitude is concerned with status, popularity, and how they are viewed by others and will seek objects that assist in developing their desired social image (Carpenter et al., 2013). An example of a product with social-adjustive function would be a designer T-shirt, such as one with an embroidered horse or a couture-brand logo that communicates its worth to viewers. Attitudes serving a social-adjustive function promote the capability to connect with appropriate social group members or to impress attractive others. Snyder and DeBono (1985) have suggested that attitudes may often serve contrasting functions for people who differ in self-monitoring. High self-monitoring individuals typically attempt to tailor their behavior to the social/interpersonal requirement of the situations they encounter, to fit in with others, thus implying that they may often hold attitudes that serve a social-adjustive function. In a series of studies assessing participants' responses to advertisements, Snyder and DeBono (1985) found that high self-monitoring individuals were influenced more by image-oriented "soft-sell" ads that implied a product's utility at helping its users to fit in with others (i.e., social-adjustive concerns), whereas low self-monitoring individuals were much more responsive to "hard-sell" ads that focused on the intrinsic quality and value of the products (said to reflect value-expressive concerns) (Bazzini & Shaffer 1995). Advertising studies have shown that participants form more favorable attitudes toward a variety of consumer goods when the ads highlight functionally relevant rather than functionally irrelevant concerns (Shavitt, 1989; Snyder & DeBono, 1985). Persuasive appeals are most effective at influencing attitudes when they in some way address the underlying motives that such attitudes serve (DeBono & Harnish, 1988).

Value-expressive attitudes

Perhaps the most difficult to conceptualize and affect, value-expressive functions assist in the outward expression of innate values. Some attitudes are meaningful to a person because they articulate beliefs that are intrinsic to that person's self-concept (i.e. their ideas about who they are). The attitude is, consequently, "part of who they are" and the expression of that attitude communicates important things about that person to others (Carpenter et al., 2013). Hullett (2002) used value-relevance as an indication of the perceived utility of an attitude to achieve a desired end-state. It is a direct measure of the relationship between a value and an attitude, rather than a measure of the expression of attitudes that are linked to personal values. Concentrating on value-expressive communication of an attitude rather than value-relevance allows communication behavior to take center stage in considering the relationship between values, attitudes, and behaviors (Carpenter et al., 2013). Value-expressive attitudes serve no direct outward purpose, and can be best understood as existing to satisfy an individual's need to feel unique and true-to-self. Individuals with value-expressive attitudes are not concerned with much other than being true to themselves (Carpenter et al., 2013). Product-wise, a concert T-shirt that was passed down from father to son due to their shared value of the musical stylings of that artist would be value-expressive in that the son feels the T-shirt, no matter how dingy, is an extension of his true self.

Ego-defensive attitudes

Ego-defensive functions serve to protect the individual from both internal and external unpleasantness. Ego-defensive attitudes allow people to avoid accepting unpalatable or objectionable aspects of self or of the external world. Ego-defensive attitudes can advocate conserving one's own self-esteem. An ego-defensive function, in which one's attitude is held to protect oneself from threatening or undesirable truths (Bazzini & Shaffer 1995). Threats to self-esteem can include personal failings or poor behavior. Katz (1960) and Shavitt and Nelson (2002) posit that ego-defensive attitudes aid in self-esteem maintenance through multiple processes. Cialdini et al. (1976) propose that a product serving an ego-defensive function would be a T-shirt with the logo of a championship-winning sports team to boost one's own ego through what they term "basking in reflected glory". That is, the recognition of a sports team's greatness serves to boost one's own self-esteem through general association.

Knowledge attitudes

The fifth function, that of knowledge, aids individuals in comprehending the world around them. Individuals with a knowledge attitude seek to understand occurrences out of the desire to know, not because it is immediately relevant to their needs, but because they simply want to understand (Carpenter et al., 2013). Attitudes that serve a knowledge function help people gain greater understanding of the structure and operation of their world (Katz, 1960). The world that people inhabit is extremely complex, and that attitudes might facilitate making sense of that world without serving needs other than understanding. Other scholars propose that the knowledge function drives attitudes that serve for no purpose other than learning about the world as an end in itself, predicated on a basic need to know (Locander & Spivey, 1978).

== Contemporary research ==
In 1986 Gregory Herek posited that all attitudes should be perceived as serving either an evaluative or an expressive function, with all attitudes serving one of these functions to some extent. This "neofunctional" reconceptualization allows for attitudes to then serve multiple functions, which thus allows researchers to measure how much influence each attitude has on function (Carpenter et al., 2013). Herek (1986) also posited that some personality characteristics may be linked to attitudes serving a specific function. This suggestion has proven to be valid in a multitude of studies that take self-monitoring into account as a predictable personality type in relation to attitude functions (Snyder & DeBono, 1985; Shavitt, 1990; Shavitt & Nelson, 2002).

Herek's (1986) neofunctional theory resulted in a boom of development of social influence research relating to FAT. Most of this research has centered around the "matching hypothesis" that stems from the original Katz (1960) study, as it manipulates individuals' attitudes to determine whether matching product advertising appeals to attitude functions regarding the product. Most this research has shown that matching functional attitudes to messaging regarding the function of a product results in increased persuasive salience (Shavitt, 1990; Shavitt & Nelson, 2002). Other studies have gone even further in attempting to measure the cognitive processes that underlie individual functional attitudes especially in relation to the Elaboration Likelihood Model (DeBono & Harnish, 1988; Petty & Wegener, 1998), albeit to mixed results showing positive ELM-based processing for high self-monitors, but negative suasory effects in subjects deemed to be low self-monitoring.

== Herek's neofunctional approach ==
After Katz (1960) and Smith's (1956) seminal studies, the functional approach to attitudes was effectively abandoned. Citing the lack of empirical methodological tests to quantify attitude functions as the main reason for the detriment of functional attitude theory, in 1986 Gregory Herek set out to create a new approach to functional attitude theory (Herek, 1986). Recognizing the validity of both the reasoned action (Fishbein & Ajzen, 1975, 1980) and the symbolic approaches (Kinder & Sears, 1981) to attitudes, Herek proposed that both approaches may be equally appropriate to employ depending on certain person characteristics, attitude domains, or situations (Herek, 1986, 1987). Herek posited that attitudes serve two general purposes: they are either evaluative or expressive. Within evaluative attitudes, Herek proposed three evaluative functions: experiential and specific, experiential and schematic, or anticipatory-evaluative. Likewise, expressive attitudes served three separate functions: social-expressive, value-expressive, or defensive. Herek's Neofunctional Approach to Attitudes, then, proposed that these different attitudes regarding the same attitude object may form for different purposes in different situations or domains, and, likewise, individuals may hold the same attitudes toward the object, but for a variety of different functions. By allowing for multiple attitudes to be held for different functions, Herek created a quantitative scale that allows for empirical comparison of multiple attitudes regarding the same object (Carpenter, 2013).

Development

Herek claimed that functionalism was attractive as an approach to attitude theory because it felt like "common sense" to most people and possessed the potential to integrate other attitude theories such as Ajzen & Fishbein's (1980) theory of reasoned action, or Sears et al.'s (1980) symbolic politics (Herek, 1987), but because Smith (1956) and Katz (1960) failed to create accurate and consistent methodologies in their seminal studies, functionalism was never able to get off the ground and develop a comprehensive theory able to predict conditions under which specific attitude functions would dominate (Herek, 1987). To create an empirical functional theory, Herek first developed two different methodologies to quantify and group different functions of attitudes.

Method One: Content Analysis

Herek set out to determine what functions attitudes mainly served by conducting content analyses of undergraduate student essays describing their feelings about lesbian women and gay men (Herek, 1987). Herek chose the topic because of his belief that it was a controversial enough issue at the time to elicit extreme attitudes both in terms of acceptance and rejection of gay people. Because of the nature of the issue, it was also expected that attitudes reported regarding gays would be deeply-held and would serve a wide range of functions. Subjects were instructed to begin their essay with "I have generally positive [or negative] attitudes toward lesbians and male homosexuals because…" (Herek, p. 287). Herek and two assistants then categorized the essays by themes, defined as, "any idea or complete thought somehow related to the respondent's attitudes." The researchers found twenty-eight recurring themes which they then coded every essay for, parsing categories as necessary. After the preliminary study, which evaluated 110 essays, a new sample of 248 students from the same university wrote attitude essays on the same topic of gays and lesbians. The new sample also completed questionnaires that collected demographic data and were also used to select students who reported exclusively heterosexual behaviors. A total of 205 of this new sample qualified for coding based on the presence or absence of the 28 themes previously found. Using block cluster analysis, the researchers identified patterns of multiple themes within essays, which were interpreted to indicate the presence of function(s). Block cluster analysis resulted in five interpretable clusters of themes which were then refined per the theoretical perspectives of Smith et al. (1956) and Katz (1960). This refinement resulted in two patterns of themes containing positive attitudes (experiential-schematic: positive, self-expressive: positive), and three patterns containing negative attitudes (experiential-schematic: negative, self-expressive: negative, and defensive).

Method Two: Attitude Functions Inventory

Recognizing that content analysis can be a time-consuming procedure, Herek also developed an objective inventory for attitude functions based on the sentence "My opinions about [target] mainly are based on…" with different completions for the sentence based on the four functions: experiential-schematic, defensive, value-expressive, and social-expressive (Herek, 1987). Sixty-nine subjects completed four variations of the AFI, the first of which was a follow-up to the original content analysis assessing the attitudes toward lesbians and gays, and the other three examining attitudes toward persons with AIDS, cancer, or mental illness, respectively. Using a Likert scale, respondents rated AFI statements on a scale ranging from 'not at all,' 'true of me,' or 'very true of me.' Additionally, respondents completed three attitude-related personality measures: the Defense Mechanisms Inventory, the Self-Consciousness Scale, and the Self-Monitoring Scale. Using the results of the personality tests, Herek successfully predicted where certain personalities would fall on the AFI, with all personalities falling somewhere on the scale.

== Neofunctional attitude functions ==
Evaluative functions

The source benefit of evaluative functions is associated with rewards and punishments from the attitude object itself. This means that when a functionally evaluative attitude is held, attitude objects are treated as ends in themselves as individuals perceive their association between either reward or punishment. Positive attitudes will arise toward an object when the individual perceives it as a source of utility or pleasure while negative attitudes are a result of direct past, or anticipated future, unpleasant experiences with the object. In line with the original posits of both Katz (1960) and Smith et al. (1956), neofunctional evaluative attitudes allow people to organize their reality according to both self-interest and predictability. Herek specified three individual evaluative functions:

Experiential-specific

- Attitudes that are experiential and specific arise after interacting with a particular instance of the object category wherein a specific attitude object, rather than a category of objects, is evaluated in terms of its individual utility. For example, an individual who had a positive experience when riding in their friend's car might develop an experiential-specific attitude toward that brand and model of car, but their attitude would not be applicable across the general category of all cars or even of the category of that brand of cars.

Experiential-schematic

- Attitudes that are experiential and schematic arise after interacting with a particular instance of the attitude object category, and experiences become representative of the object category as a whole. The individual's past experiences with representatives of that object category led to cognitive schema that serve to set attitudes for all objects within the category. Here, an individual who had a good experience riding in their friend's car might develop an experiential-schematic attitude toward all cars made by the same brand as their friend's car.

Anticipatory-evaluative

- While experiential-specific and schematic attitude functions are based on deductive prior experiences, individuals with an anticipatory-evaluative attitude must be inductive in their prediction of the utility of attitude objects. Anticipatory-evaluative attitudes can be based on whatever object qualities an individual chooses to use. For instance, if an individual hates red and their friend offers to take them for a ride in their red car, the individual might take on a negative anticipatory-evaluative attitude that predicts that they will not enjoy the car ride.

Expressive functions

Within expressive functions of attitude, the attitude object is a means to an end. Attitude objects of expressive attitudes are used as vehicles to assure social status, boost self-esteem, and/or reduce anxiety. While expressive functions serve some sense of utility, the effects are not as apparent, and are often intrinsic rewards rather than the extrinsic utility seen with evaluative functions.

Social-expressive

- Social-expressive attitudes serve the function of social-maintenance or acceptance, and are based on the needs of an individual to be accepted by others. Snyder and DeBono's (1985) self-monitoring study is useful in determining the likelihood of an individual to hold a social-expressive attitude. High self-monitors should be more likely to hold social-expressive attitudes as they are theoretically more in-tune with their social surroundings, thus leading to a higher need for this function in order to maintain or elevate their status.

Value-expressive

- Value-expressive attitudes are based in an individual's needs to define themselves through expressing core values and aligning themselves with value groups (such as political parties, churches, organizations, etc.). Low self-monitors should theoretically be more prone to value-expressive attitudes as they are more concerned with their individual principles than they are with social status, however value-expressive attitudes can be found in all personality types, especially when it comes to contentious issues such as abortion.

Defensive

- Defensive attitudes serve to reduce turmoil caused by internal, typically unconscious, conflicts. Defensive attitudes can be understood in terms cognitive dissonance theory as a means to achieve consonance when dealing with internal (or external) dissonance. An individual would develop a defensive attitude, then, when presented with an idea that is contrary to their internal values or beliefs.

== Sources of attitude functions ==
Herek believed one of the downfalls of Katz and Smith et al. (1956) was their direct comparison of personality traits, which are relatively stable, to attitude functions, which studies show to fluctuate from person-to-person or situation-to-situation (Herek, 1986). Recognizing that individuals’ psychological predispositions to functions varied, and that individuals often expressed the same attitude for different reasons or attitudes about separate objects for the same reason, Herek proposed three sources of attitude functions that attitudes could vary across. These sources can aid in the prediction and influence of behavior when it can be determined from which source an individual will root their attitude.

Person characteristics

Herek defines person characteristics as "relatively stable psychological needs, values, and orientations toward the world" (Herek, 1986). Through the content analysis and AFI, Herek found that individuals with experiential-schematic attitudes scored higher on the self-monitoring test, theorizing that experiential-schematic intergroup individuals are more sensitive to their surroundings as well as their own values. Herek also showed that persons who operate mainly on evaluative functions show strong concerns for their own well-being. Alternatively, social-expressive attitudes were found most amongst individuals who exhibited a high need for affiliation as well high self-presentation awareness (Snyder & DeBono, 1985). Ultimately, personality is a weak means for social influence as personality is typically stable across individuals.

Domain characteristics

Herek defined domain characteristics as "groups, objects, issues, or behaviors toward which people hold attitudes" (1986). Individual domains can include a multitude of different attitudes. For instance, in Herek's methodology development attitudes were examined within the domain of attitudes toward gays and lesbians. Within this domain is contained attitudes toward people with AIDS, attitudes toward government-funding of anti-AIDS programming, attitudes toward AIDS fundraisers, etc. Broad domains like AIDS or politics likely contain all variations of attitude functions across a population, but more narrow domains, such as consumer products, are less likely to elicit an array of attitudes as individuals tend to view this type of domain from an evaluative perspective.

Situational characteristics

Situations are defined by Herek as "relatively transient social episodes", and include the setting, actors, and context of the episode. In situations where an individual recognizes specific personal goals, evaluative attitudes are more likely to develop. Past experiences with attitude objects, as necessary in experiential-specific and schematic attitudes, will stimulate memories of past situations involving the attitude object, which will then determine the valence of attitude held by the individual. Alternatively, in situations that highlight identity needs, such as a political debate, individuals are more likely to employ an expressive attitude.

== Critique ==
While FAT has proven extremely valuable in predicting increased influence through functional matching through an array of empirical studies, explanations for why this effect is present have yet to materialize. Lavine and Snyder (1996) posited that the matching effect could be attributed to biased processing of messages that are functionally linked, with individuals processing functionally-matched messages peripherally (ELM) or heuristically (HSM). However, research based on the ELM has provided mixed results and many studies have failed in their attempts to replicate original results and thus theories other than ELM are necessary to understand the function matching phenomenon (Carpenter et al., 2013).

Additionally, FAT as a field of research is very messy in its theoretical models of application insofar as studies have not relied on one concrete definition of functional attitudes. From the theory's beginnings, Katz (1960) and Smith et al. (1956) conceptualized similar-yet-different functions, Herek's (1986) neofunctional theory further parsed these functions, and later research by Snyder and DeBono (1985) added the personality variables of high v. low self-monitors into FAT. This is not to say that any of their research was invalidated by these additions or differences, but only to note that the theory could benefit from a set of unitary applicable definitions and functions.

== Benefits and practical applications ==
FAT is best understood as a foundational approach to social influence upon which other models or processes may be applied. It is incredibly useful in that it can be easily understood and applied to real-life situations, allowing social influencers to predict the persuasive appeal that would best match their audience's functional attitude toward a product or idea. Ample lab research has categorically proven that matching attitude functions to appeals improves the salience of persuasive arguments, especially regarding advertisements (Shavitt & Nelson, 2002; Carpenter et al., 2013). This matching effect can also be exploited in interpersonal social influence situations and professions such as courtroom arguments or governmental lobbying.

== Anecdotal application ==
Generally, democratic governmental systems are understood to operate in a utilitarian fashion in that the most preferred candidate is elected by the masses, and is then expected to act on legislation in a manner that induces maximum benefit to their constituents. While it is mainly true that politicians act to increase utility for their constituents, there is also an individual attitudinal side to every politician that, according to FAT, can be understood to serve any of a variety of functions, and can thus be manipulated and matched to arguments in support of or against certain bills. That is, if a lobbyist can understand the attitude functions of legislation in regard to a particular politician, then that lobbyist can also predict which attitude function to match to their persuasive appeal.

== Future applications ==
Perhaps the most economically promising theoretical application of FAT lies in the future of online ad targeting. Lab research on personality regarding attitude functions has had to rely on self-reporting or surveys to determine high v. low self-monitoring or expressive v. evaluative personality types. As technology improves, the ability to determine personality types and attitude functions, as well as the consumer behaviors associated with these factors, may soon become algorithmic. Meta-analyses of IP datamining such as search history and browsing habits, combined with knowledge of consumer behavior obtained through records that pre-date the internet could lead to electronic profiles of individual consumers to be used by advertisers to hyper-target their audience with ultra-tailored or matched ads.

== Summary ==
Katz (1960) and Smith et al. (1956) originally set out to discover the purpose of varying attitudes, determining that attitudes exist to serve a variety of functions necessary to individuals’ physical, emotional, and social needs. Their functional attitudes theory sparked a wave of research in the 1980s that was able to consistently empirically link function-matched appeals and arguments to increased persuasion when presented to individuals perceived to be in that attitude function. This matching hypothesis has been replicated, but studies attempting to prove the link behind it have not. While future research is needed to determine the cause of the matching effect, as well as to develop consistent attitude and personality measurements, FAT is a practically applicable theory that allows social influencers to accurately predict what type of functional appeal should be used when persuading an audience about a product or idea.
