= Self-esteem functions =

In psychology

Self-esteem can be defined as how favorably individuals evaluate themselves. According to Leary, self-esteem is the relationship between one's real self and one's ideal self, feeding off of favorable behaviors. It refers to an individual's sense of their value or worth, or the extent to which a person values, approves of, appreciates, prizes, or likes themselves. Self-esteem is generally considered the evaluative component of the self-concept, a broader representation of the self that includes cognitive and behavioral aspects as well as evaluative or affective ones. There are several different proposals as to the functions of self-esteem. One proposal is that it satisfies the inherent need to feel good about oneself. Another is that it serves to minimize social rejection. Self-esteem is also known as a way for a person to remain dominant in relationships. Self-esteem is known to protect people from potential fear that arises from the prospect of death (terror management theory). Motivating individuals towards their goals, high self-esteem fosters effective coping, while low self-esteem tends to result in avoidance.

== Evolutionary perspectives ==
=== Sociometer theory ===
The sociometer theory was developed by Mark Leary to explain the functions of self-esteem. Leary and his colleagues stated that a sociometer is a measure of how a person is desirable by other people and this is oftentimes influenced through a person's self-esteem. They suggested that self-esteem has evolved to monitor one's social acceptance and is used as a gauge for avoiding social devaluation and rejection. The sociometer theory is strongly grounded in evolutionary theories which suggest that survival depends on social acceptance for reasons such as protection, reciprocal behaviours and most importantly reproduction. The monitoring of one's acceptance via self-esteem is therefore crucial in order to achieve these kinds of social interactions and be better able to compete for the social benefits of them.

Kirkpatrick and Ellis expanded on Leary's work and suggested that the sociometer's function was not only to ensure that an individual was not excluded from their social group but also to rate the strength of the social group compared to other groups.

=== Self-determination theory ===
Self-determination theory (SDT) states that man is born with an intrinsic motivation to explore, absorb and master his surroundings and that true high self-esteem is reported when the basic psychological nutrients, or needs, of life (relatedness, competency and autonomy) are in balance.

=== Ethological perspective ===
The ethological perspective suggests that self-esteem is an adaptation that has evolved for the purpose of maintaining dominance in relationships. It is said that human beings have evolved certain mechanisms for monitoring dominance in order to facilitate reproductive behaviours such attaining a mate. Because attention and favorable reactions from others were associated with being dominant, feelings of self-esteem have also become associated with social approval and deference. From this perspective, the motive to evaluate oneself positively in evolutionary terms is to enhance one's relative dominance.

Leary et al. tested the idea of dominance and social acceptance on self-esteem. Trait self-esteem appeared to be related to the degree to which participants felt accepted by specific people in their lives, but not to the degree to which participants thought those individuals perceived them as dominant. Acceptance and dominance appeared to have independent effects on self-esteem.

=== Terror management theory ===
The terror management theory (TMT), developed by Sheldon Solomon et al., which in relation to self-esteem states that having self-esteem helps protect individuals from the fear they experience at the prospect of their own death. It is suggested that people are constantly searching for ways to enhance their self-esteem in order to quell unconscious death anxiety. This internalisation of cultural values is also a key factor in terror management theory in which self-esteem is seen as a culturally based construction derived from integrating specific contingencies valued by society into one's own 'worldview'. High self-esteem promotes positive affect and personal growth, psychological well-being and coping as a buffer against anxiety in the knowledge of our eventual certain death, and reduces defensive anxiety related behaviour. Terror management theory, based primarily on the writings of Ernest Becker and Otto Rank, posits that self-esteem is sought because it provides protection against the fear of death. From this perspective, the fear of death is rooted in an instinct for self-preservation that humans share with other species.

== Success ==
Some researchers believe that having a high self-esteem facilitates goal achievement. Bednar, Wells, and Peterson proposed that self-esteem is a form of subjective feedback about the adequacy of the self. This feedback (self-esteem) is positive when the individual copes well with circumstances and is negative when avoiding threats. In turn, self-esteem affects subsequent goal achievement; high self-esteem increases coping, and low self-esteem leads to further avoidance.

=== Illusion of control ===
Illusion of control is the tendency for human beings to believe they can control, or at least influence, outcomes that they demonstrably have no influence over, a mindset often seen in those who gamble. However, for individuals who are not gamblers, Taylor and Brown suggest it may serve to be a function of self-esteem. Belief that there is a level of control over the situation a person is in, may lead to an increased level of motivation and performance in a self-regulating manner. In other words, one will work harder to become successful if they believe they have control over their success. A high self-esteem would be needed for this belief of control and so the need for a sense of control may be a function of self-esteem.

When applying sociometer theory, it suggests that the illusion of control is an adaptive response in order to self-regulate behaviour to cultural norms and thereby provide an individual with an increased level of self-esteem. In social psychology, the illusion of control is grouped with two other concepts and termed as the 'positive illusions'.
