= Test anxiety =

Anxiety or stress triggered by exams

Test anxiety is a combination of physiological over-arousal, tension and somatic symptoms, along with worry, dread, fear of failure, and catastrophizing, that occur before or during test situations. It is a psychological condition in which people experience extreme stress, anxiety, and discomfort during and/or before taking a test. This anxiety creates significant barriers to learning and performance. Research suggests that high levels of emotional distress have a direct correlation to reduced academic performance and higher overall student drop-out rates. Test anxiety can have broader consequences, negatively affecting a student's social, emotional and behavioural development, as well as their feelings about themselves and school.

Highly test-anxious students score about 12 percentile points below their low anxiety peers. Test anxiety is prevalent amongst the student populations of the world. It has been studied formally since the early 1950s beginning with researchers George Mandler and Seymour Sarason. Sarason's brother, Irwin G. Sarason, then contributed to early investigation of test anxiety, clarifying the relationship between the focused effects of test anxiety, other focused forms of anxiety, and generalized anxiety.

Test anxiety can also be labeled as anticipatory anxiety, situational anxiety or evaluation anxiety. Some anxiety is normal and often helpful to stay mentally and physically alert. When one experiences too much anxiety, however, it can result in emotional or physical distress, difficulty concentrating, and emotional worry. Inferior performance arises not because of intellectual problems or poor academic preparation, but because testing situations create a sense of threat for those experiencing test anxiety; anxiety resulting from the sense of threat then disrupts attention and memory function. Researchers suggest that between 25 and 40 percent of students experience test anxiety. Students with disabilities and students in gifted educations classes tend to experience high rates of test anxiety. Students who experience test anxiety tend to be easily distracted during a test, experience difficulty with comprehending relatively simple instructions, and have trouble organizing or recalling relevant information.

== Signs and symptoms ==
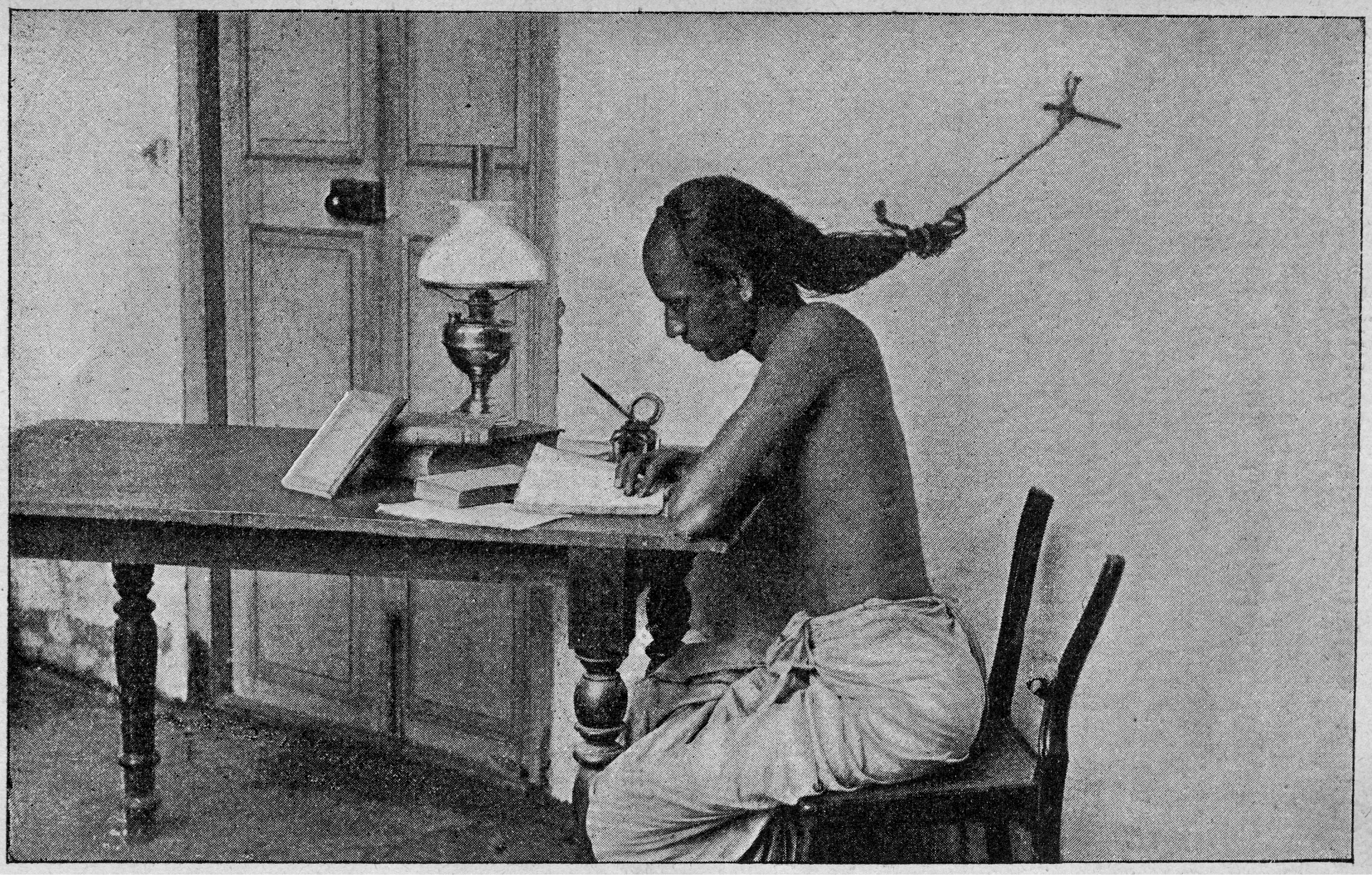
A student of the University of Madras, with his hair tied to a nail in the wall, to prevent him from falling asleep (1905)

Researchers believe that feelings of anxiety arise to prepare a person for threats. In humans, anxiety symptoms are distributed along a continuum and different symptom levels of anxiety predict outcomes. Responses consist of increased heart rate, stress hormone secretion, restlessness, vigilance, and fear of a potentially dangerous environment. Anxiety prepares the body physically, cognitively, and behaviourally to detect and deal with threats to survival. As a result, a person's body begins to hyperventilate to allow more oxygen to enter the bloodstream, divert blood to muscles, and sweat to cool the skin. In individuals, the degree to which an anxiety response is developed is based on the probability of bad things happening in the environment and the individual's ability to cope with them. In the case of test taking, this might be a failing exam grade that prevents the student from being accepted to a post-secondary institution. A person's beliefs about their own competencies are a form of self-knowledge, which plays an important role in analyzing situations that might be threatening. When a person has feelings of low competence about their abilities they are likely to anticipate negative outcomes such as failure, under uncertain conditions. Thus, evaluative situations including tests and exams, are perceived as more threatening by students who have low competencies.

There is a difference between generalized anxiety disorders (GAD) and test anxiety. GAD is characterized by "trait anxiety" which results in a person experiencing high levels of stress across a wide range of situations. In contrast, people with test anxiety have a "state anxiety" which results in high levels of nervousness specific to testing.

Symptoms of test anxiety can range from moderate to severe. "Students who exhibit moderate symptoms are still able to perform relatively well on exams. Other students with severe anxiety will often experience panic attacks."

Bad physical symptoms include: headache, upset stomach, feeling of fear, feeling of dread, shortness of breath, sweating, pacing or fidgeting, crying, racing thoughts and blanking out.

During states of excitement or stress, the body releases adrenaline. Adrenaline is known to cause physical symptoms that accompany test anxiety, such as increased heart rate, sweating, and rapid breathing. In many cases having adrenaline is a good thing. It is helpful when dealing with stressful situations, ensuring alertness and preparation; but for some people, the symptoms are difficult or impossible to handle, making it impossible to focus on tests.

Test anxiety consists of:

- Physiological overarousal – often termed emotionality. Somatic signs include headaches, stomach aches, nausea, diarrhea, excessive sweating, shortness of breath, light-headedness or fainting, rapid heartbeat and dry mouth. Test anxiety can also lead to panic attacks, in which the student may have a sudden intense fear, difficulty breathing, and extreme discomfort.
- Worry and dread – maladaptive cognitions. This includes catastrophic expectations of gloom and doom, fear of failure, random thoughts, feelings of inadequacy, self-condemnation, negative self-talk, frustration and comparing oneself unfavorably to others.
- Cognitive/Behavioral – poor concentration, "going blank" or "freezing," confusion, and poor organization. The inability to concentrate leads to impaired performance on tests. Fidgeting during or outright avoidance of the test. Students often report "blanking out" even though they have studied sufficiently for the test.
- Emotional – low self-esteem, depression, anger, and a feeling of hopelessness.

== Causes ==
Research shows that parental pressure is associated with greater worry, test irrelevant thoughts, and stronger bodily symptoms relating to anxiety during a test.

Other causes of test anxiety may include fear of failure, procrastination, and previous poor test performance. As well, characteristics of the test environment such as: nature of the task, difficulty, atmosphere, time constraints, examiner characteristics, mode of administration and physical setting can affect the level of anxiousness felt by the student. Researchers Putwain & Best (2011), examined test performance among elementary children when the teacher put pressure on the students in an attempt to create a more high stress environment. Their findings showed that students performed worse in high threat situations and experienced more test anxiety and worrisome thoughts than when in a low threat environment.

Test anxiety is known to develop into a vicious cycle. After experiencing test anxiety on one test, the student may become so fearful of it happening again they become more anxious and upset than they would normally, or even than they experienced on the previous test. If the cycle continues without acknowledgement, or the student seeking help, the student may begin to feel helpless in the situation.

People who experience test anxiety often have parents or siblings who have test anxiety or other types of anxiety. Anxiety does seem to have some genetic components.

=== Diagnosis ===
Test anxiety can be diagnosed using the Diagnostic and Statistical Manual-IV, under the classification of social phobia. Social phobias are characterized by a marked and persistent fear of social or performance situations in which embarrassment may occur. In order to be diagnosed as suffering from a social phobia, the DSM-IV states that the individual must present four different factors.

- Must show an immediate anxiety response when exposed to the feared social or performance situation.
- Must show various attempts to avoid social or performance situation, or sometimes endure it but with extreme fear.
- Must experience a disruption to normal activities due to the avoidance or fear associated with the situation
- Must have experienced the symptoms for at least six months.

Other variables related to test anxiety are:

- Obsessive compulsive disorders
- Perfectionist tendencies and unrealistic expectations
- Negative self-esteem, self-statements, and criticism
- Poor motivation or lack of confidence
- Stereotype threat
- Inadequate study and test-taking skills
- Poor eating, sleeping and exercising habits

== Theories ==
Anxiety is defined as the "psychological mechanism whereby the current intensification of a dangerous drive results in the elicitation of defenses." George Mandler and Seymour Sarason (1952), developed the theory that anxiety present in testing situations is an important determinant of test performance. Individuals that become highly anxious during tests typically perform more poorly on tests than low-test anxious persons, especially when tests are given under stressful evaluative conditions such as a post-secondary exam. The feelings of forgetfulness, or drawing a "blank" are developed because of anxiety-produced interference between relevant responses and irrelevant responses generated from the person's anxious state. The difference in performance of a high-anxious test taker compared to a low-anxious test taker is largely due to the difference in their ability to focus on the tasks required. A low-anxious test taker is able to focus greater attention on the tasks required of them while taking the test, while a high-anxious test taker is focused on their internal self, and the anxiety they are feeling. Anxious test takers do not perform adequately on the test as their attention is divided between themselves and the test. Therefore, students with high test anxiety are unable to focus their full attention on the test. Furthermore, anxiousness is evoked when a student believes that the evaluative situation, such as an assessment, exceeds his or her intellectual, motivational, and social capabilities.

Psychologists Liebert and Morris (1967) analyzed the structure of test anxiety given on two distinct factors: Cognitive Test Anxiety and Emotionality. Emotionality means that the individual shows high levels of several different symptoms related to test anxiety that can be seen through physiological responses experienced during situations where they are being evaluated; such as an exam. Some of the physiological manifestations include: increased galvanic skin response and heart rate, dizziness, nausea, or feelings of panic. There is evidence that emotionality is a distinct part of test anxiety; however, it can be seen that when an individual displays high emotionality it means that it is mostly associated with declining performance, but only when the individual is also experiencing high levels of worry.

The other factor mentioned is Cognitive Test Anxiety, also known as worry. It is mostly composed of the individuals cognitive reactions to situations where they are being evaluated, in the times prior to, during, and after those tasks. Some of the thoughts that individuals with high cognitive test anxiety are constantly dealing with are comparing self performance to peers, considering the consequences of failure, low levels of confidence in performance, excessive worry about grades, feeling that they are unprepared for tests, and loss of self-worth.

Researchers Putwain, Woods & Symes (2010), found that a low academic self-concept was associated with higher worry and tension about their abilities to do well on a test. A student's metacognitive beliefs play an important role in the maintenance of negative self-beliefs.

Anxiety reactions can be generalized from previous experiences to testing situations. Feelings of inadequacy, helplessness, anticipations of punishment or loss of status and esteem manifest anxiety responses. As well, the presence of an audience can debilitate the performance of high anxious test takers and increase the performance of low anxious test takers. Persons who score high on anxiety scales tend to describe themselves in negative, self-devaluing terms. Highly anxious test takers also blame themselves for their failure significantly more than low anxious test takers.

The study of the relationship between anxiety and performance can be understood by using the Yerkes-Dodson Law, where one can see the facilitating and debilitating effects of arousal on performance as an inverted "U". An example of this correlation can be seen in terms of a child taking a test where the degree of arousal or anxiety that the child portrays can be seen as beneficial to the performance. Though, if the child doesn't have a feeling or fear or failure or some sort of encouragement to perform well on the test, then the child is unlikely to put the necessary effort into preparing or being motivated when taking the test and so he or she will not perform to their fullest potential.

However, if before or during a test a child's level of anxiety is above the optimum level, they may also fail to demonstrate their true abilities. Under these circumstances fear of the actual test may disrupt preparation and cause a great amount of distress during the test that it is more than likely to impair their performance.

=== Attentional theories ===
There are two main groups of attentional theories that attempt to explain compromised performance in pressured situations.

One group of theories are the explicit monitoring theories. They state that when a person is expected to perform a specific skill, the pressure may cause an increased self-consciousness and inward focus, which can disrupt their ability to successfully perform that task. Thinking about step-by-step procedures can inhibit one's ability to execute a task. For example, a study by R. Gray found that baseball players put into the high-pressure condition had increased errors, and an increased ability to recall details like the direction their bat was moving. This indicates that the pressured players were monitoring themselves more, which impacted their ability to successfully hit the ball.

A second group of theories are the distraction theories. These theories state that high-pressure environments create a dual-task situation, in which the person's attention is divided between the task at hand and unhelpful thoughts about the situation and possible negative consequences of poor performance. Attention is an important part of working memory, which is the system that actively holds several pieces of relevant information in the mind while inhibiting irrelevant information. Working memory has a limited capacity, and the addition of stress and anxiety reduces the resources available to focus on relevant information.

In situations in which individuals need to concentrate their attention on a specific task, emotional stimuli can divert their attention to a greater degree than non-emotional stimuli. Emotional stimuli will often dominate a person's thoughts, and any attempt to suppress them will require additional working memory resources. When working memory divides resources between the aversive cognitions and the task-relevant material, then the person's ability to use the relevant information on a test will suffer.
People who suffer from test anxiety are more likely to experience negative cognitions while in evaluative situations. Furthermore, test anxious persons have been found to bias their attention towards threatening and anxiety related stimuli more than nonemotional stimuli.
Research has accordingly found that tasks that rely heavily on working memory are the ones that suffer the most during pressure. Shortfalls in performance that are caused by test anxiety seem to be related to the extent to which the student has full access to their working memory.

When comparing these two theories in the context of academic performance, a majority of work supports distraction theories. One reason for this is that many of the skills performed in the classroom require heavy demands on working memory. However, there are different kinds of pressure situations. There is monitoring pressure, in which an individual's performance is impacted due to the presence of an audience, and outcome pressure, in which an individual's performance is influenced by the consequences of the testing results. In a study, DeCaro et al. found that performance on a rule-based task, that relies heavily on working memory, was impaired by outcome pressure, but not monitoring pressure, whereas performance on an information-integration task, which does not require attentional control, was hurt by monitoring pressure, but not outcome pressure. These findings indicate that performance is compromised in different ways depending on the type of task, and the types of pressure, and that both theories can be correct.

==== Attentional control ====
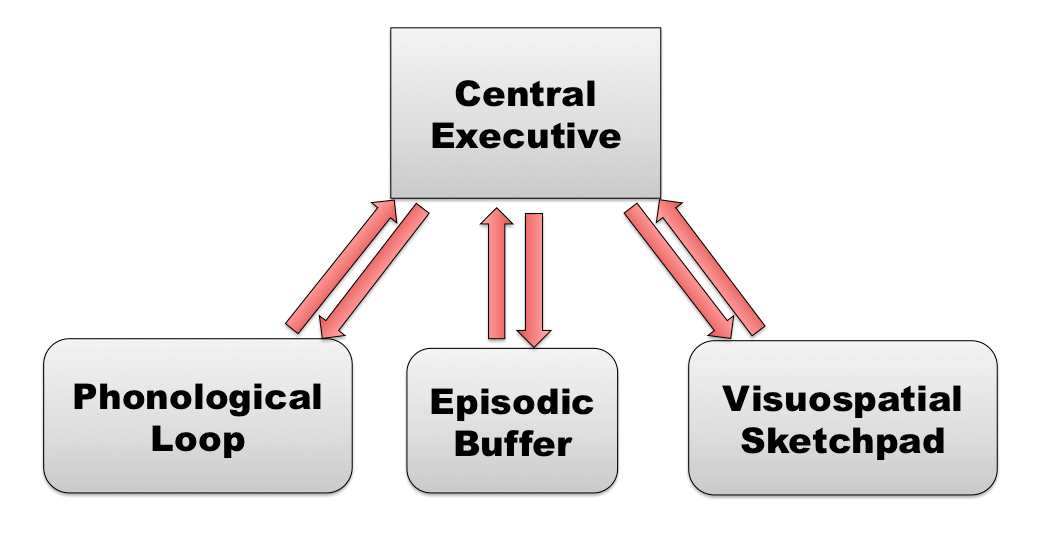
Schematic of the four elements of Baddeley's model of working memory

Eysenck et al. elaborate upon the distraction theories and propose the attentional control theory. This theory uses Baddeley's model of working memory to explain the effects of anxiety on working memory and on performance. In Baddeley's theory, working memory (WM) consists of four components, one of them the central executive that has a number of tasks such as coordination of the temporary stores of phonological and visual information (phonological loop and visuospatial sketchpad, respectively).

The attentional control theory assumes that anxiety primarily affects attentional control, which is a key function of the central executive. Attentional control is the balance between the two attentional systems, the goal-directed system, influenced by the individual's goals, and the stimulus-driven system, influenced by salient stimuli. According to the attentional control theory, anxiety disrupts the balance between these two systems. The stimulus-driven system becomes stronger at the expense of the goal-directed system, thereby impairing the efficiency of the inhibition and shifting functions of the central executive.

In support of this theory, there is strong evidence that anxiety largely impairs processing efficiency rather than performance effectiveness. Performance effectiveness refers to the quality of performance whereas processing efficiency refers to the amount of resources used to attain an effective performance. There is also evidence that anxiety impairs both the inhibition and the shifting function. Therefore, this theory suggests that students high in test anxiety will have to allocate more resources to the task at hand than non-test anxiety students in order to achieve the same results.

In general, people with higher working memory capacity do better on academic tasks, but this changes when people are under acute pressure. Sian Beilock et al. found that pressure led individuals with a high working memory capacity to perform worse on a complicated task, whereas individuals with a low WM capacity got the same low results with or without pressure. This was because people with high WM could use more effective, but more demanding, problem solving strategies in the low pressure condition, which they had to abandon in the high pressure condition. The low WM people never used these demanding strategies in the first place. Evidence for similar working memory effects in children has also been found. Evidence that trait anxiety might have different effects on working memory than state or acute pressure situations comes from Johnson et al. who found individuals' performances on a task showed a decrease in accuracy due to trait anxiety for individuals with low or average WM capacity, but did not significantly decrease for individuals with high WM.

== Measurement scales ==
Early scales, by authors such as Charles Spielberger, tended to focus on physiological and somatic features and on worry, commonly referred to as emotionality, while more recent offerings, such as that by Cassady & Johnson, emphasize cognitive processes. "Test anxiety" for these authors consists of physiological and mental processes, and impaired test performance is seen as the result.

The Children's Test Anxiety Questionnaire is specifically designed to measure test anxiety in children 8–12 years of age. It provides scores for three dimensions of test anxiety: "worrisome thoughts concerning failure (i.e. 'when I take tests, I worry about failing'), automatic reactions concerning students' general and specific somatic indications of anxiety (i.e. 'when I take tests, my heart beats fast'), and off-task behaviours concerning nervous habits and distracting behaviours (i.e. 'when I take tests, I play with my pencil')"

The Test Anxiety Inventory for Children and Adolescent (TAICA) is a way to measure and assess test anxiety in children and adolescents in Grades 4 through 12. Those individuals who are being assessed rate their responses on a 5-point Likert-type scale ranging from 1 (never true about me) to 5 (always true about me). The TAICA is a 45-item self-report measure which consists of four sub scales.

- Cognitive Obstruction/Inattention subscale assesses memory and attention difficulties and obstructed cognitions associated with test anxiety
- Physiological Hyperarousal subscale measures physical symptoms associated with the test-taking process.
- Social Humiliation subscale measures fear associated with failing a test and being belittled or ridiculed by significant others
- Worry subscale assesses negative thoughts and worries that adversely affect test performance.

== Treatment ==
Medication is not recommended to treat test anxiety; instead, standard suggestions include sleep, proper nutrition, exercise, meditation, studying without stress, and enacting habits to reduce stress during the test. Test anxiety remains a challenge for students and has considerable physiological and psychological impacts. The routine practice of slow, Device-Guided Breathing (DGB) is a major component of behavioral treatments for anxiety conditions.

=== Management ===
To gain an accurate assessment of student comprehension, instructors should be concerned with minimizing the effects of test anxiety. Instructors might offer "second chances" post test, familiarize students with test format and grading scheme, and lower the impact of any one test. If students have greater confidence in their test-taking skills, they are more likely to be comfortable and relaxed when the testing does occur. Having an intentional thinking strategy should help student performance improve.

For some individuals, poor academic performance is due to skill deficits, which could include problems in encoding (learning), rehearsal (study skills) or retrieval during a test (test-taking strategies). Skill deficits may lead to poor performance directly (failure to adequately learn the material) or indirectly (awareness of being ill-prepared causes anxiety that, in turn, leads to poor performance). Therefore, the most effective interventions are those that combine skill-focused strategies (i.e. study skills training, test-taking skills) with cognitive (i.e. cognitive restructuring) or behavioural approaches (i.e. relaxation training, systematic desensitization).

Students also need to stay healthy in order to be able to deal with stress and anxiety. They need to eat healthy, and get enough sleep.

== See also ==
- Effects of stress on memory
- Fear of negative evaluation
- Mathematical anxiety
- Anxiety disorder
- Social anxiety
- Social anxiety disorder
- Stage fright
- Camera shyness
- Category: Shyness
