= Esther Voet =

Dutch journalist and editor (born 1963)

Esther Hilah Voet (Wassenaar, 1963) is a Dutch journalist, lobbyist and editor. She worked as a reporter for the right-wing newspaper De Telegraaf, the gossip magazine Story, and the media company RTL Nederland. In 2009 she became the editor in chief for the Jewish weekly Nieuw Israëlietisch Weekblad where she worked until 2011. From 2009 to 2015 she was director of the Center for Information and Documentation Israel, a lobby organization which aims to secure the prosperity and image of the state Israel anywhere in the world.

== Biography ==
Voet had a troubled childhood; a difficult relationship with her father forced her to become independent at age sixteen, as she explained in an interview with Trouw in 2014. She started her career in journalism working for Henk van der Meijden, editor of the gossip section of De Telegraaf. By the end of the 1980s she was a reporter for Story, a weekly tabloid dedicated to celebrity news and gossip. She left because she was tired of the superficial nature of her work, and afterward apologized to people she felt she had hurt in her articles. She spent two years, from 2009 to 2011, working for the Jewish weekly Nieuw Israëlietisch Weekblad, and then became director of the Centrum Informatie en Documentatie Israël, or CIDI, a position that requires her to comment publicly on such matters as Holocaust education, Nazi literature (the ongoing debate over the accessibility of Mein Kampf), and antisemitism. She caused some uproar in the Dutch Jewish community when she disinvited Geert Wilders from signing a petition condemning antisemitism. During a speech to the Knesset she warned about the growing antisemitism she saw among the Dutch.

== See also ==
- History of the Jews in the Netherlands
