= Nieuw Israëlietisch Weekblad =

Nieuw Israelietisch Weekblad
- Managing editor: Esther Voet
- Frequency: Weekly
- Circulation: 6,000
- Founded: August 4, 1865
- Country: Netherlands
- Based in: Amstelveen
- Language: Dutch
- Website: niw.nl

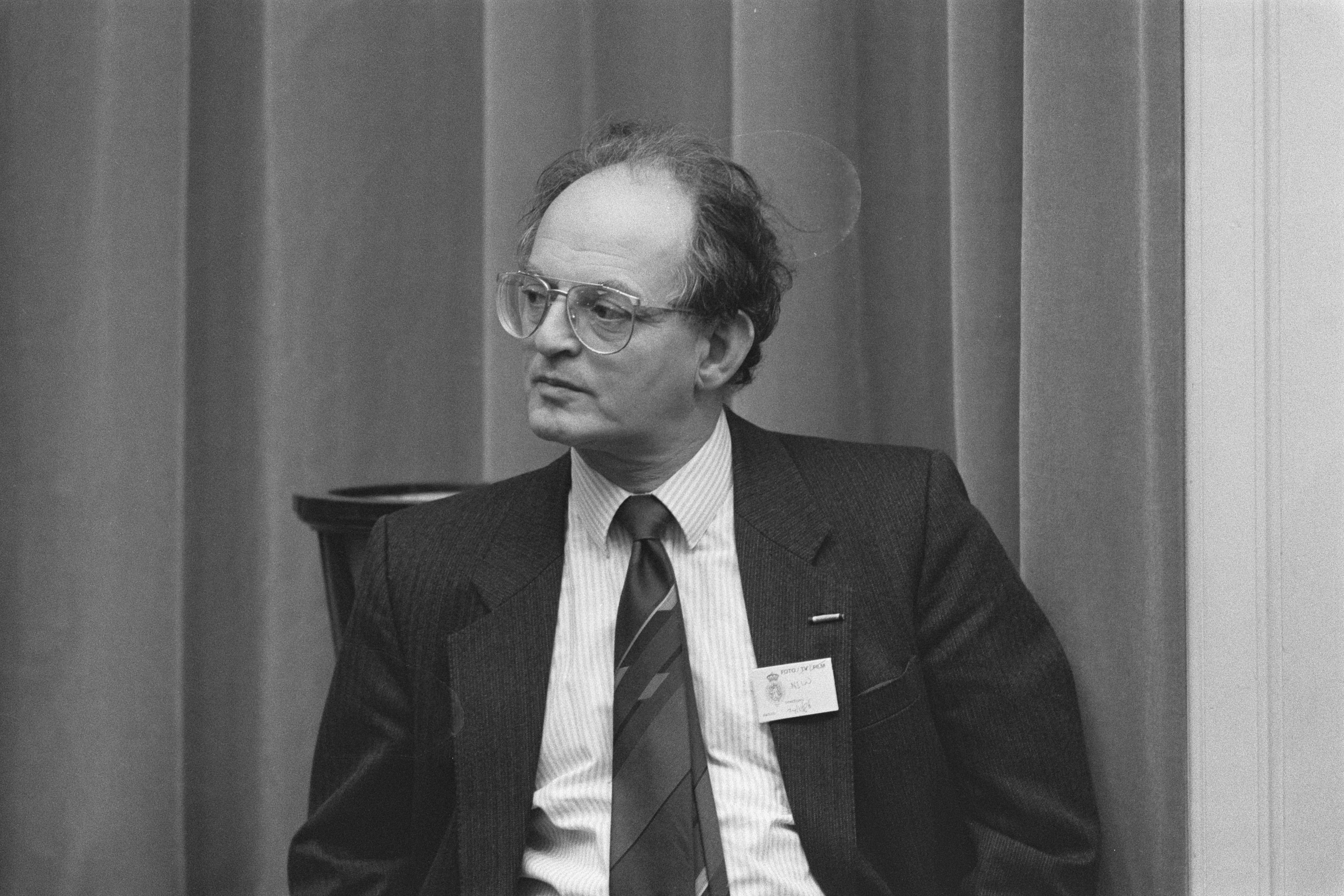
Mau Kopuit, chief editor 1971-1992

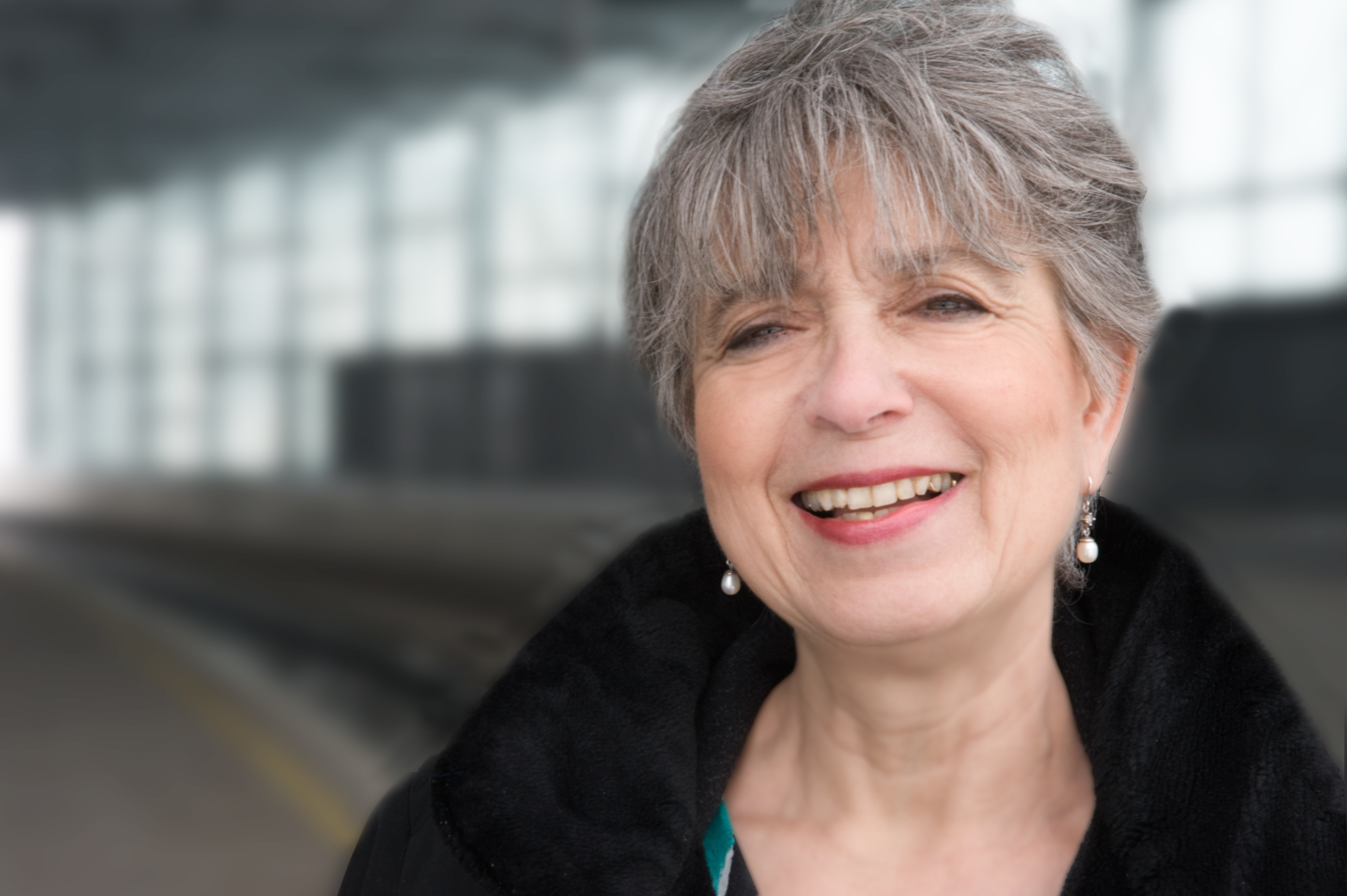
Tamarah Benima, chief editor 1992-1999

The Nieuw Israelietisch Weekblad (Dutch: New Israelite Weekly), in short NIW, is the only Jewish weekly and the oldest functioning news magazine in the Netherlands. Founded on August 4, 1865, it has since informed the Jewish community on issues concerning Jews and Judaism in the Netherlands and in the world. Its headquarters is in Amstelveen. The chairman of the NIW is Gideon Simon and the managing editor is Esther Voet.

The NIW has some 6,000 subscribers. To enlarge the readership, the NIW started a modernization campaign in 2001, but this had minimal effect on the number of subscribers. The total circulation of the magazine as of 2019 is more than 15.000 copies.

== Chief editors ==
- Meyer Marcus Roest, 1865-1867
- J. Mendes Chumaceiro, 1867-1875
- Philip Elte, 1875-1918
- D.L. Staal, 1918-1938
- Is. de Vries, J.S. Joachimsthal, E. van Amerongen, 1938-1940
- Is. de Vries, E. van Amerongen, 1945
- Jaap Soetendorp, 1945-1948
- Jo Melkman, 1948-1952
- Jaap Meijer, 1952
- Jo Melkman, 1952-1957
- Mozes Heiman Gans, 1957-1967
- Philip van Tijn, 1968
- Hans Knoop, 1968-1971
- Mau Kopuit, 1971-1992
- Tamarah Benima, 1992-1999
- Carine Cassuto, 1999-2002
- Elise Friedmann, 2002-2008
- Paul Damen, 2008-2009
- Esther Voet, 2009-2011
- Maurice Swirc, 2011-2015
- Esther Voet, since 2015
