= Rejection hotline =

Phone number with a caller rejected voicemail

A rejection hotline is a phone number which delivers a pre-recorded message telling the caller that the caller is rejected by the person who gave the caller that number.

This project was set up as a practical joke by Jeff Goldblatt in 2001. Goldblatt says that after observing an awkward situation where a man approached a pretty woman and failed to get her phone number, he came up with the idea of a fake phone number as a subtle way of rejecting the date. While the hotline was set up as a joke, in 2002, a business, RH Brands, LLC, was started based on the website humorhotlines.com. Soon the hotline started receiving millions of calls.

Since then, a number of "rejection hotlines" were set up the United States, Ireland, Australia and Canada. In some major cities the number receives over 50,000 calls a day without any paid promotion whatsoever. humorhotlines.com facilitated numerous pranks across the country by setting numerous hotlines such as "It Could Always Suck More" hotline, the "Psychiatric Hotline", and the "Angry Santa" hotline, which have been also receiving millions of calls. Most of them had nothing to do with "rejection".

The classic rejection hotline has a voice saying "Hello, this is not the person you were trying to call! Unfortunately, the person who gave you this number obviously did not want you to have their real number", and proceeded to list a variety of possible reasons for the "rejection": "Maybe you're just not this person’s type. Note: This could mean boring, dumb, annoying, arrogant or just a general weirdo", etc. There are several other numbers with various kinds of messages. While the hotlines were supposed to be a joke, their popularity shows they do fulfill a social function.
