= Alexei Ukhtomsky =

Russian physiologist

Alexei Alexeyevich Ukhtomsky
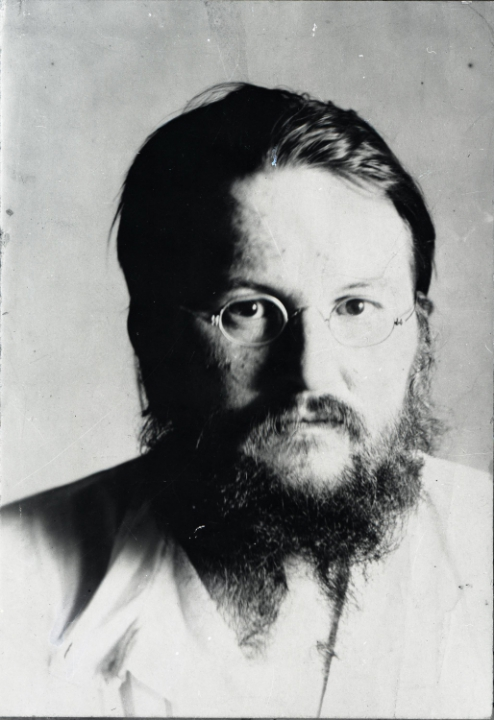
- Born: 13 June 1875; Rybinsk district, Yaroslavl, Russian Empire
- Died: 31 August 1942 (aged 67); Leningrad, USSR
- Awards: Lenin Prize

Alexei Alexeyevich Ukhtomsky (Russian: Алексей Алексеевич Ухтомский; 13 June 1875 – 31 August 1942) was a Russian and Soviet physiologist. His main contribution to science was the theory of dominant.

Alexey Ukhtomsky was born 13 (25) June 1875 on the family estate of the princes Ukhtomsky (from ancient nobility, going back to the Rjurik period) in the hamlet of Vosloma, near Arefino in the Rybinsk district in the province of Yaroslavl. His parents were the retired officer Alexey Ukhtomskii (1842–1902 ), and his wife Antonina Fyodorovna, née Anfimova (1847 -1913). They had five sons, Alexey, who died in infancy, Vladimir, Nicholas, and the eldest son Alexander, who later became Archbishop Andrey ( 1872–1937), and two daughters, Mary and Elizabeth.

In June 1876 his father's sister Anna Nikolaevna Ukhtomskaya, who lived in the town of Rybinsk, had just buried her mother, for whom she had cared for many years, and being now alone was looking for something to do with her life. Since Antonina Fedorovna was very busy and had insufficient time for her family, on 27 September 1876 Alex was sent away to be raised by his aunt Anna, and in his own words, she was his "principal teacher and companion until her death in 1898."

In 1888 Alexey, who had not finished grammar school, entered the Nizhny Novgorod Cadet Corps at the urging of his father and mother. There he started to show an interest in science. During this period, the future professor Ivan P. Dolbnya (1853–1912), a mathematics teacher who introduced his students to a wide range of subjects of natural science, had a significant influence on him. Later Ukhtomsky called him "someone who teaches you to think." In cadet school Ukhtomsky showed interest not only in the physical and mathematical disciplines, but also in philosophy, psychology, ethics and literature. By age 18, he became acquainted with the writings of Aristotle, Descartes, Spinoza, Feuerbach, James, Hegel, Nietzsche, Kant, and other scientists and philosophers.

In 1894, under the influence of his brother Alexander, and on the advice of I.P. Dolbnya Ukhtomsky entered the philological department of the Moscow Theological Academy. He did not live in a dorm, but in an apartment, that was kept comfortable by Nadezhda Bobrovskaya, who lived with him as an assistant and housekeeper until May 1941. As a young student of the Theological Academy, Ukhtomsky spent a month and a half in the department for chronically ill of the Yaroslavl mental hospital. He considered the years spent in the academy as most happy and productive for his spiritual development. The subject of his thesis was "The cosmological proof of the existence of God". There he proposed the idea of the unlimited possibilities of the human mind, and the uniqueness of each individual. In his academy years Ukhtomsky conceived the idea to identify the natural foundations of human moral behavior, and to find the physiological mechanisms by which the human personality develops in its full diversity. Ukhtomsky became a doctoral candidate of theology. Later, in his autobiography Ukhtomsky wrote: "my Ph.D. thesis put closer study of the physiology of the brain, neural activity in general, as well as the physiology of behavior, firmly on the agenda." Upon graduating from the academy, he chose not to pursue an ecclesiastical career. He joined the Russian Orthodox sect of the Old Believers (more precisely the Old Ritualists) (his estate Vosloma had always been inhabited by Old Believers). He wanted to become a physiologist, but since graduates of the theological academies and seminaries were not entitled to enter the university departments of natural sciences, he joined the Department of Oriental Studies instead.

From 1899 Ukhtomsky was a guest student at the Oriental Department of St. Petersburg University, where he mastered the Hebrew language. The following year he was among the regular students of the Physics and Mathematics Faculty of St. Petersburg State University, studying physiology (while he was not allowed to start in this department, transfer from another faculty was not prohibited). In 1902 he began to his specialization under Professor N.E. Vvedensky. Since 1909 he collaborated with Vvedensky in research on reflex antagonists. In 1911 he defended a thesis on the topic "On the dependence of motor cortical effects on the central collateral effects" in which he outlined the results of five years of experiments. This was the first time he formulated the principle of the dominant focus, developed later in 1921 and in subsequent years. After defending his thesis he taught for five years in the Psychoneurological institute (now the I.I. Mechnikov Northwestern State Medical University).

In December 1917, after participating in the Local Council of the Orthodox Church, Ukhtomsky left for Rybinsk, where he lived in his parental home almost all of 1918. He spent the time reading religious literature and working on the land around the house. In late 1918 – early 1919, the house was nationalized. In the autumn of 1920 the Rybinsk house was searched, some things were confiscated. Ukhtomsky had arrived in Rybinsk 25 November with documents of the University and the Petrograd Soviet, in which he was elected as a member of its VIth convocation. These documents contained a request to leave him two rooms in his former home, "that should not be bourgeois in size and character."

November 1930 he was arrested by "agents of the Rybinsk politburo" because, as he acknowledges, of incautious remarks in a conversations in scientific company. The documents from the Petrograd Soviet saved him from immediate execution, and Ukhtomsky was sent to the Yaroslavl political detention center, and then to Moscow in the special branch of the Cheka in the Lubyanka. While in custody, he lectured his fellow inmates on physiology. At the end of January 1921 he was released thanks to the efforts of fellow scientists and he was allowed to keep his former home and had his possessions returned. However, he did not return to Rybinsk.

From 1920 he was Head of the Laboratory of the Institute of Natural Sciences. In 1922, after the death of Vvedensky he took charge of the Faculty of Human and Animal Physiology of the University of Petrograd. Since 1935 he was the founding director of the Institute of Physiology of Leningrad State University and from 1937 he was the head of the electrophysiology laboratory of the Academy of Sciences of the USSR. He was head of the biology department at Leningrad University, from 1931 until 1938 he was president of the Leningrad Society of Naturalists. Outside the university, he taught physiology at the Lesgaft Institute, at the Psychoneurological Institute, and at the Rabfak (Workers' Faculty). In 1932 he was awarded the Lenin prize. In 1933 he was elected a corresponding member, and in 1935 a full member of the Academy of Sciences of the USSR. In the early 1920s Ukhtomsky began to publish on the foundations of the principle of dominance as a new theory of brain function. At the turn of 1923–1924 years he presented a report at the Second All-Union Congress of Psychoneurologists and Neurophysiologists, in which he put forward the principle of dominance as one of the main factors of central innervation. In 1927 he wrote a monograph "Parabiosis and Dominant", in which the organic link between the dominant and the basic tenets of Vvedensky’s theory of parabiosis is explained. In subsequent years, he came to understand the role played by the variation in stability of the physiological substrate in the dominant focus, as expressed in the report of 1934, "Excitation, inhibition, fatigue." According to Ukhtomsky, the dominant is a temporary governing center of excitation in the central nervous system, which creates a hidden readiness of the organism to a specific activity, while at the same time inhibiting other reflexes.

Ukhtomsky was a monk and a priest. He was a delegate of the Local Council of the Russian Orthodox Church in 1917–1918, he participated actively in conferences on reunification with the Old Believers, he was an elder of the Old Believer’s church on Marat street (now the Museum of the Arctic and Antarctic on Marat Street), where he usually led worship. When across the country confiscation of church property started, and his parishioners tried to hide the valuables, Ukhtomsky was arrested, but nothing came of it and he was soon released, when he pledged to stop religious propaganda. Ukhtomsky had command of seven languages, was versed in theology, philosophy, political economy, architecture, was a painter of icons, and played the violin.

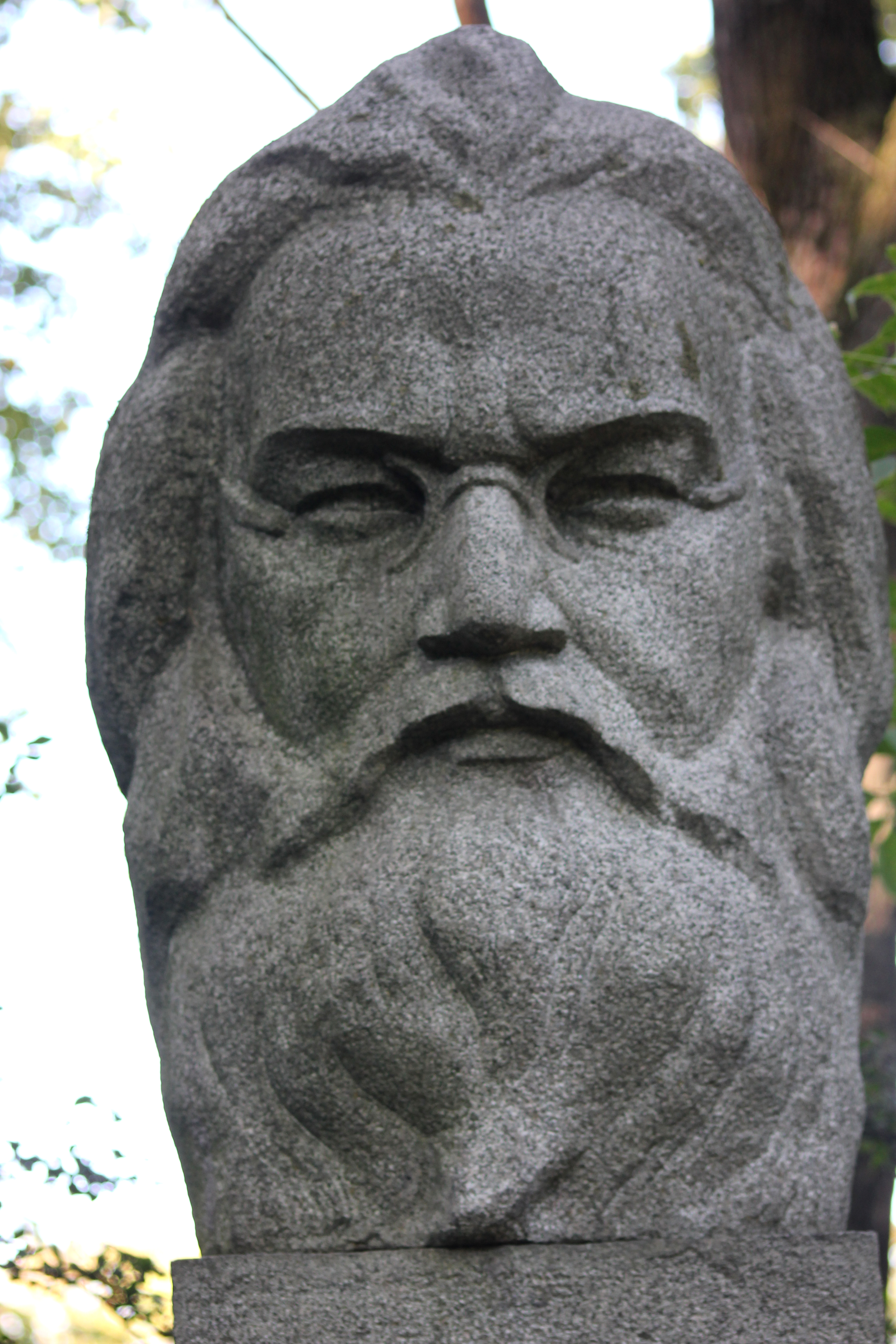
The grave of Ukhtomsky at the Literatorskiye Mostki Cemetery, detail.

In 1941 Ukhtomsky remained in besieged Leningrad, where he participated in the organization of scientific work in support of its defense, and directed research on traumatic shock that was relevant for warfare. He died 31 August 1942, without having read the proofs of a report titled "The system of reflexes in ascending order.", which he prepared a week before his death. He is buried at the Literatorskiye Mostki Cemetery.

The theory of the dominant focus

Ukhtomsky’s work on the dominant focus is generally considered his most important discovery. The theory is capable of explaining some of the fundamental aspects of behavior and mental processes of man. The Dominant principle is described in his paper ”The dominant as operating principle of nerve centers” and other scientific works. This principle was a development of N.E. Vvedensky’s ideas. The Ukhtomsky borrowed the term ”dominant” from Richard Avenarius book ”Critique of Pure Experience". In a footnote to the paper ”The dominant as operating principle of nerve centers” Ukhtomsky writes: I use this term in the sense of Avenarius : "In the competition of dependent vital series, one of them must be regarded as the dominant for a given moment, and the overall behavior of the individual will then be determined in that direction.” By “dominant" Ukhtomsky and his followers understood" a more or less stable focus of increased excitability, evoked in whatever way, and stimuli newly arriving at the centers of excitation serve to amplify (reinforce) excitation in this focus, while in the rest of the central nervous system inhibition spreads widely. " The theory of the dominant focus has outgrown the framework of physiology and became a trend in the whole Russian philosophical anthropology, and has also been applied in a psychologically oriented literary criticism.

"I believe that real human happiness will be possible only after future man will be able to foster in himself the capability to switch to the life experience of another person, when the dominant in the face of the other is fostered in each of us."

A.A. Ukhtomsky
