= Mark Leary =

American psychologist

Mark Richard Leary (born November 29, 1954) is a professor of psychology and neuroscience at Duke University (Durham, North Carolina). His research has made significant contributions to the fields of social psychology and personality psychology.

== Background ==
Leary completed his undergraduate coursework at West Virginia Wesleyan College in 1976. He obtained his M.A. and Ph.D. in social psychology from the University of Florida. He has held teaching positions at Denison University, the University of Texas at Austin, Wake Forest University, and Duke University. Leary is credited for publishing or editing 12 books and more than 200 articles or chapters for academic journals. He is a fellow of the American Psychological Association. Leary also founded the scholarly journal Self and Identity in 2001. Additionally, he has served on the editorial review boards of many other academic journals in psychology. In addition, he lectures for The Great Courses.

== Topics of research ==
Leary's research has spanned the topics of the self and identity (social science), self-esteem, interpersonal motivation and emotion, need to belong, and self-compassion.

=== Sociometer theory ===
He is well known for developing the sociometer theory, an interpersonal explanation for variations in self-esteem within individuals. This theory suggests people have an internal measure of social acceptance (or rejection) which determines state self-esteem; unhealthy levels of state self-esteem encourage changes in affect, behavior, and/or cognition in order to regain social acceptance.

=== The self ===
Much of Leary's research is centered on the notion of the human self, self-awareness, and self-reflection. While there are clear benefits to the human ability to distinguish oneself from others and reflect upon past experiences, Leary and his colleagues have revealed many disadvantages as well. Examples include the tendencies to harbor bitterness, ruminate about imaginary scenarios, and panic about remote threats to safety. Each of these negative thoughts can lead to emotional challenges unique to the human species. Leary has also cited four aspects of the self which lead to interpersonal conflict: (1) self-other differentiation, (2) egocentrism, (3) self-esteem, and (4) egotism.

=== Need to belong ===
Leary, along with Roy Baumeister, wrote a 1995 paper on the need to belong. In the footsteps of Maslow, they believed that belonging is a human need. It is in our nature, they state, to attempt to form meaningful and lasting bonds with others. The inability to do so, or the breakdown of existing bonds, can have a negative, long-term effect on an individual, including problems with their psychological and physical health, as well as overall well-being. This negative impact is what defines belongingness as a need, as opposed to a simple desire. There are two aspects to the need to belong. There must be frequent interaction with little to no conflict, and the relationship must be ongoing. When one of these bonds is broken, people tend to try to replace the relationship with a new bond. These bonds form in a variety of relationships anyone, not just between a person and a leader or authority figure, such as proposed by the attachment theory of John Bowlby.

=== Self compassion ===
More recently, Leary has published research surrounding self-compassion, a topic widely covered in positive psychology. Leary and his colleagues have defined self-compassion as "an orientation to care for oneself," and have shown that individuals higher in self-compassion approach their shortcomings with significantly less criticism. Leary and his colleagues have shown many mental health benefits to be related to self-compassion, including lower levels of depression, neuroticism, dissatisfaction with life, and social withdrawal. In one study in which participants were asked to think of the worst event that recently happened to them and then indicate their reactions, thoughts, and emotions on the Self-Compassion scale, those with higher levels of self-compassion indicated that they tried not to be hard on themselves in the face of negative events. Self-compassionate people tended to be more accepting of flaws in their character and behavior than people low in self-compassion: people with high levels of self-compassion did not obsess or become defensive over undesirable parts of their character. The positive affects derived from self-compassion result in a decrease in negative reactions in the face of unfortunate events, including failure and rejection. Putting the situation into perspective and treating oneself with kindness diminished the need to exaggerate the negative event for the self-compassionate participants, compared to those who were not self-compassionate. Furthermore, Leary and colleagues have researched the relationship between self-compassion and physical pain. One particular study examined how self-compassion affects obese patients with persistent musculoskeletal pain, and found that patients who reported higher levels of self-compassion were less likely to pain catastophize and had lower levels of negative affect and pain disability.

== See also ==
- Sociometer
