= List of Mayo Chiki! chapters =

Cover of the third tankōbon volume, featuring Masamune Usami.

Mayo Chiki! (まよチキ!) is a Japanese manga series written by Hajime Asano and illustrated by NEET. The story revolves around Kinjirō Sakamachi, a 17-year-old high school boy who suffers from gynophobia, the abnormal fear of women. While using the men's washroom, he accidentally discovers that the popular and handsome butler Subaru Konoe is in fact a girl. Now that Kinjirō knows about Subaru's secret, he must work together with Subaru and her sadistic mistress, Kanade Suzutsuki, to protect Subaru's secret from being discovered.

The manga adaptation began its began its serialization on July 27, 2010, in the Media Factory's seinen manga magazine, Comic Alive. The series was collected into seven manga volumes, published under the Alive Comics imprint. On February 29, 2012, it was announced that the manga series would be licensed in English by Seven Seas Entertainment. A total of seven volumes were released from December 11, 2012, to September 2, 2014. Volume 3 of the English adaptation of Mayo Chiki! reached No. 3 on the New York Times Best Seller List for manga for the week of July 13–20, 2013, while volume 7 reached No. 3 for the week of September 21–28, 2014. The series has also been licensed in Taiwan and released through Sharp Point Press.

A spin-off manga of the series titled Mayo Mayo! (まよマヨ!) was serialized in Kadokawa Shoten's bishōjo magazine, Nyantype.

Note: Chapter titles are taken from the English translated manga adaptation by Seven Seas.

== Volume list ==
No.	Original release date	Original ISBN	English release date	English ISBN
1	October 23, 2010	978-4-8401-3387-6	December 11, 2012	978-1-9378-6705-8
01. "The butler's secret"; 02. "The stray butler and the chicken"; 03. "Love strikes suddenly"; 04. "Paradise summer"; 05. "The wolf & the Lamb"; Bonus Chat Corner; Free talk; Special thanks & 2 bonus panels.
Subaru Konoe is a popular guy in school, and is a butler to the principal's daughter Suzutsuki Kanade. Sakamachi Kinjiro (Jiro for short) is a seventeen-year-old guy who suffers from gynophobia. One day while using the restroom Jiro finds out Subaru's secret that he is really a she. After being knocked out, and handcuffed to a bed in the nurse's office he finds out why Subaru is cross dressing from Suzutsuki. Jiro also discovers that the sweetness of Suzutsuki is just a front and in reality she can be quite sadistic. She discovers that Jiro has gynophobia, and offers to cure him if he keeps Subaru's secret to which he agrees. In the third chapter Jiro's little sister Kureha is introduced, she is active in sports and unknowingly contributes to her brother's phobia. Suzutsuki later sets up a date between Subaru, and Jiro at a local arcade. She gets Suburu to call Jiro by his given name much to her embarrassment. All goes smoothly until Kureha appears thinking that Suburu is a crossdressing guy hitting on her brother. She goes on the attack, but is defeated by Subaru resulting in her falling in love with what she thinks is a cool guy much to her brother's dismay. The last two chapters have Jiro, Kureha, Subaru, and Suzutsuki all going to an indoor pool during their summer break from school. Suzutsuki comes up with a scheme to get rid of Subaru's fear of knives by having Subaru's father Nagare dress up as a kidnapper. She, along with Kureha are fake kidnapped which causes Jiro, and Subari to go on the rescue. During the rescue Subaru cures her phobia of knives, but is upset with Jiro for making her worry so much by taking the lead. The volume ends with Suzutsuki revealing to Jiro that Subaru was her first crush.
2	June 23, 2011	978-4-8401-4003-4	March 5, 2013	978-1-9378-6718-8
06. "The butler's homecoming"; 07. "Butler vs. maid"; 08. "Baby, please go home"; 09. "Rabbit and chicken"; 10. "Rooftop secret"; Side story: Alone in an empty classroom; Bonus Chat Corner; Special thanks
Golden week has started and Jiro is looking forward to it but Subaru comes to visit him saying that she got thrown out of Suzutsuki's family house. Jiro lets her stay, but it isn't long before Suzutsuki shows up at his house offering to be his maid. The two girls have a series of contests to see who is more qualified to be the Sakamachi family servant, Jiro and his sister are the judges. The contests are withdrawn however when Jiro collapses with a fever due to a cold and lack of sleep. Concerned that Jiro is going to die, Subaru almost "kills him with kindness" in order to get him better. Jiro sneaks away from his house, and asks Suzutsuki for help. She agrees to helping him if he can convince Subaru to go back with her saying that the reason why she was thrown out was due to a feud between Subaru and her father. Suzutsuki's father had enough, and threw both Subaru and her father out until they could resolve things. Jiro goes to confront Subaru's father to try and resolve things but is met with hostility. Subaru comes to save Jiro but as she does Jiro sees his sister about to be hit by a truck, and is hit saving her. Not badly hurt Jiro gets up and assures Subaru that she can go back with Suzutsuki and that it would take more than a truck or a cold to kill him. Subaru agrees to go back, and after waking up in the hospital he is surprised with a kiss from Suzutsuki who says it is her first. Later on, Usami Masamune is introduced. She says she is a member of one of Subaru's school fan clubs called the S4, and blackmails Jiro to date her. Subaru is hurt when Jiro chooses Masamune to go to their school's cultural festival together as he had promised her earlier the two of them would go.
3	September 22, 2011	978-4-8401-4037-9	July 2, 2013	978-1-9378-6734-8
11. "School festival excitement"; 12. "Liar, liar"; 13. "Unexpected elopement"; 14. "Bayside baby"; 15. "The bath of impending doom!"; Bonus Chat Corner; Bonus comic; Special thanks
Suzutsuki asks Jiro about his recent falling out with Subaru, and offers her assistance when he needs it after learning the truth about Masamune using him. Jiro meets Masamune for their date buying her Takoyaki, in return she agrees to cook dinner for him sometime. Subaru finds the two of them, and out of jealousy tries to get in between them on their date which causes the S4 to chase after Jiro. He runs into the school's gym where not knowing what to do he confesses to Suzutsuki who happened to be there. She turns him down which appeases the S4, but playfully confesses her love back to him afterwards out of "revenge" which causes Subaru to leave in disgust. While chasing after Subaru, Jiro bumps into Narumi Nakuru (in costume) who introduces herself as president of Subaru's other fan club. Nakuru also tells Jiro not to trust Masamune, she also says that the president of the S4 is Suzutsuki. Masamune hears her name and confronts Nakuru, but runs away after being put on the spot by Suzutsuki who shows up. Jiro finds Masamune ready to jump from the roof of the school out of loneliness, but talks her out of dying by offering to be her friend. Subaru also apologizes to him after learning the truth behind his actions from Suzutsuki. The next day Jiro ends up at Masamune's place and as promised she cooks for him, and also offers to cure him of his gynophobia which is unsuccessfully attempted in the form of holding him in a skimpy swimsuit. Jiro returns to his house to find Subaru waiting for him, she offers him a drink that contains a drug that knocks him out. When Jiro awakens he finds himself in a private seaside hot springs resort, the result of a pretend elopement by Suzutsuki due to an argument with her parents. He later spends the day at the beach but when he surprisingly runs into his sister, Masamune, and Nakuru, Jiro has to protect Subaru's secret as she took the chance to dress like a girl. Suzutsuki allows the three girls to stay at the Inn, but later Nagare also shows up which makes Jiro uneasy. Nagare tells Jiro why Suzutsuki really ran away from home, but not before Jiro is surprised by seeing Subaru naked in the men's bath.
4	July 22, 2012	978-4-8401-4495-7	November 5, 2013	978-1-9378-6776-8
16. "Summer festival battle royale"; 17. "Nyu!"; 18. "Happy birthday, little sister"; 19. "Picnic counseling"; 20. "Maid cafe rhapsody"; 21. "Summer vacation finale"; 22. "The mistress' soliloquy"; Bonus Chat Corner; NEET Afterward; Special thanks
The Summer festival arrives and with it a paintball fight with the prize being a stuffed sheep plushie and a kiss from the winner of the Kimono contest which ends up being Subaru. Suzutsuki ends up winning the paintball contest but afterwards Subaru confesses to Jiro that she wants to be more than just friends with him. She stumbles on what to say though and goes with "best friends" to which Jiro agrees to. After the festival Suzutsuki develops a case of hiccups, and later confronts Jiro about Subaru as she has noticed that she has been feeling down. Suzutsuki is taken aback however when Jiro calls her "cute" as a result of her hiccups before he passes out. Her hiccups abruptly go away afterwards leaving Jiro suspicious. Kureha's sixteenth birthday then approaches, and Jiro makes up for not getting her a birthday present the year before. Nakuru later approaches Jiro with a problem, and invites him on a picnic date in order to get his advice. The next day he offers to help Masamune at her job at a maid café but when Suzutsuki shows up she accuses him of having a fetish for maids. Both girls put him to the test to see if it is true, but when Subaru shows up she leaves with Suzutsuki who says that he has no such fetish. Masamune asks him afterwards if he would work with her more often. On the last day of Jiro's summer vacation Subaru appears at his house and asks him to help with her cook for Suzutsuki. Subaru accidentally gets drunk while there, and before she can tell something important to him she passes out. The last chapter has a confused Suzutsuki questioning her feelings towards Jiro. Subaru asks her if she likes him but she denies that any romance is at hand, Subaru then asks for her help when it comes to confessing to him. Suzutsuki agrees to help Subaru out of friendship, but through her thoughts it is shown that she has romantic feelings for Jiro.
5	November 22, 2012	978-4-8401-4750-7	March 18, 2014	978-1-626920-06-4
23. "Sports festival scramble"; 24. "Versus complex"; 25. "Working for the Suzutsukis isn't working for me"; 26. "Isn't that love?"; 27. "An unexpected rebirth"; Bonus Chat Corner; Special thanks
The sports festival begins with a challenge from Nakuru's older sister Narumi Schrodinger towards Jiro and Subaru (Who came to his defense). Narumi has misunderstood what happened during the picnic lunch between her sister and Jiro and is angry. During the start of the sports festival Jiro and Subaru win the first round. To Jiro's surprise Narumi invites him to lunch and tells him she is really doing all of this so she can see how Nakuru reacts when she beats Jiro as she tells him Nakuru has a crush on him. The final special event comes that involves knocking the opponent into the water to win, Subaru withdraws due to having to wear boy's swimwear and Jiro beats his sister by way of tickling. Nakuru asks Jiro to trade places with her to fight her sister which is what Narumi wanted in order for her sister to get stronger as a person and Nakuru ends up losing as a result of saving her sister from going in. After the match Nakuru confesses her love to Jiro to which he rejects so Nakuru decides to become his mistress instead to Jiro and Subaru's "BL relationship". Jiro's house also gets hit by lightning and burns causing Suzutsuki to take him and his sister in but as servants. Suzutsuki introduces Jiro to her other maid Saotome Ichigo who right away dislikes Jiro saying that she loves her mistress and asks what he did to her as she has noticed a change. Saotome tries to get the answer out of Jiro but is interrupted by Subaru so she asks Jiro to go clean the bathroom where he finds Suzutsuki taking a shower. Jiro is blindfolded by her and asked to wash her back which he does, Suzutsuki then says she is going to torment Jiro more, advancing on him saying she wants Jiro to hate her and that it is his fault, he eventually faints from the ordeal. Later on Suzutsuki takes on Masamune as a maid and Subaru lets Jiro eat in her room as Saotome who cooks has not let him eat much of anything. Subaru offers to help cure Jiro and holds him wearing a swimsuit, just then Kureha comes to check on her causing Subaru to rush to take her clothes off to change but cannot do it fast enough so she hides in the closet naked with Jiro. In the closet Subaru has to sneeze to not alert his sister Jiro kisses Subaru causing him to pass out the resulting noise frightens his sister who runs out of the room thinking it is a ghost, leaving Subaru blushing. At the same time Saotome asks Suzutsuki why she has been acting so strange, before she can answer her she faints causing her to go to the hospital where Kureha tells Jiro that she thinks that Suzutsuki has a crush on him. The next day Suzutsuki is discharged from the hospital but has the mindset of an 8 year old and clingy towards Jiro. It is later found out by Subaru and Jiro via a DVD that Suzutsuki used self-hypnosis to do this to herself in order to trick Masamune but that her experiment had failed as she did not revert to her normal self, in order to do this she says on the DVD that she must be satisfied by playing with her child self. Subaru and Jiro both agree with each other to help but Jiro cannot stop thinking of how he kissed Subaru in the closet, the volume ends with Suzutsuki finding tickets to an amusement park and wanting to go.
6	May 23, 2013	978-4-8401-5057-6	May 6, 2014	978-1-626920-07-1
28 "Welcome to Musashino Land!"; 29 "On parade night"; 30 "Freeloader days"; 31 "Suzutsuki Kanade"; 32 "Sakamachi summit"; Bonus Chat Corner; NEET Afterward
At the amusement park, while helping Suzutsuki he ends up going on a side date with Masamune something that makes Subaru upset. Suzutsuki is eventually cured by her asking how Jiro feels about Subaru and then kissing him, after being cured she then tells him that she had noticed a rift between him and Subaru and asks him to come to terms with his feelings. Subaru comes back now dressed up as ordered by her mistress and she then sends them off so that Jiro can have some alone time with her, Subaru shortly after asks Jiro if they could go on a date. Jiro apologizes to Subaru for kissing her without permission and the misunderstandings and asks to be friends again, to which Subaru accepts. Jiro comes to terms with his feelings and then confesses his love to Subaru. Several days later Suzutsuki tells that he and his sister are fired, something Masamune was able to do so that they could move in with her, as a result Subaru and Suzutsuki move into the apartment next door as their neighbors. It is then shown that Jiro moved so easily as a result of him getting rejected by Subaru her asking to remain friends, he tells her later that he wants a break from being friends. One month later people start getting the idea that Jiro and Masamune are dating, this is confirmed by many who see Masamune say that Jiro is her boyfriend. In turn Suzutsuki tells that Subaru is her boyfriend and kisses her in front of everyone than asks Masamune for a double date between the four people. On the day of the date, Jiro buys dinner for Masamune something that angers Suzutsuki, they then go out to look at the rabbits in the themed restaurant. Masamune then tells Jiro the truth about what Suzutsuki is really like, upon hearing this from nearby she confronts the two of them bursting in tears denying it and then running off. Before he can go after her Masamune asks him to stop, tells him it is her birthday and kisses him confessing her love then collapses. Jiro takes her home where Masamune tells him that she feels bad about what she did to Suzutsuki and asks him to go see her, at the thought of confronting Subaru he rethinks it though. As he is leaving Jiro is greeted by Schrodinger and he tells her about Subaru asking for advice, she helps him out and Jiro goes to see Subaru and Suzutsuki. Jiro makes up with Subaru and apologizes to Suzutsuki, telling her what how he was rejected by Subaru and that he wished to be her friend and would not keep secrets from her. Suzutsuki forgives Jiro and confesses her love to him. Suzutsuki and Masamune later approach Subaru and asks how she feels about Jiro where she replies that she does indeed love him. The three girls who love Jiro later get together and decide to move in with him to cure his condition once and for all while also advancing their own agendas. The girls set a goal on when Jiro is to be fully cured being the third semester in school. The girls notice that at one point Subaru clings to Jiro without a reaction from him, a start but not a full heal when the other two cling as well. The volume ends with Masamune asking Jiro on a date for Christmas while the other two girls are busy.
7	January 23, 2014	978-4-04-066243-5	September 2, 2014	978-1-626920-49-1
33 "Christmas ice skating"; 34 "New Year's day festival"; 35 "Stargazing"; 36 "The end draws near"; 37 "The test"; 38 "The answer"; 39 "The story will be called..."; Bonus Chat Corner; Author's comment; NEET Afterward
The final volume starts off with Masamune and Jiro's date. Masamune is a little off so after Jiro questions her about it she tells about a personal issue but states that because of her new friends she is happy with her life, Subaru meanwhile spends Christmas eve with Suzutsuki who tells her to accept her feelings. On the first day of the new year Jiro meets Suzutsuki at a shrine. Suzutsuki flirts with him and tells Jiro subtly to give the girls who confessed to him an answer, he tells that he will give her an answer before school starts at the end of winter break. The day before school starts Subaru invites jiro for some stargazing that night to which he accepts. While stargazing Jiro announces to Subaru that his gynophobia is cured and again confesses his love to Subaru to which she responds by giving him a deep kiss confessing as well, they then share another deep kiss laying together. The next morning on the first day of school, Jiro is shocked when Masamune tells him that Subaru and Suzutsuki had moved out, he is further shocked when he gets to school outside of the auditorium and is told by Suzutsuki that Subaru resigned from being a butler. Jiro figures out that she resigned as a result of knowing that her mistress was in love with Jiro. Inside in front of the whole school Subaru confesses that she is a girl in response Jiro confronts her on stage announces that he will become a butler of the Suzutsuki family and proposes to Subaru, later on at Suzutsuki's mansion she accepts Jiro as her butler she asks the two of them to kiss and takes a photo using her phone that she then emails to someone. Kureha, Narumi, and Nakuru pay a visit where Subaru again confesses her love to Jiro, Kureha is not surprised as she had figured out that Subari wasn't a girl, Nakuru not so much. Nakuru accepts that she is a girl but then asks if it can be overlooked and later says she will pretend It isn't true so she can continue her BL stories and fan-club. Nagare then bursts through the door furious after getting an email of the two of them kissing and challenges Jiro to a fight to see how well suited he is to be a butler to the family and suitor to Subaru he gives Jiro a week before the fight. As the week passes Jiro undergoes training with his sister and Masamune tells him that they are still friends despite him not giving her an answer. One night as Jiro is laying down recovering from training, Suzutsuki comes up to him covers his eyes and tells him that she is fully naked, she then tries to seduce Jiro which he averts. Suzutsuki then tells Jiro that it was a test and tells him that she wants him as her butler. The day of the fight Jiro and Nagare dish it out that ends in a draw, as a result Jiro is made a trainee and is allowed to be engaged to Subaru. Masamune and Subaru end up becoming maids of the Suzutsuki household and everyone is happy as a result that they can all be together. The series ends with Nakuru, Kureha, Narumi paying them a visit, Nakuru tells of a new book she is writing. When Jiro asks about it later on, Subaru tells him that she told her it was going to be titled "The Stray Butler and The Chicken".
