= List of Lycoris Recoil episodes =

The first Japanese home media volume cover as released by Aniplex

Lycoris Recoil is an original Japanese anime television series created by Spider Lily and Asaura. Announced in December 2021, the series was produced by A-1 Pictures and directed by Shingo Adachi, and features an original story by Asaura, character designs by Imigimuru, and music composed by (K)now Name member Shūhei Mutsuki. The series aired from July 2 to September 24, 2022, on Tokyo MX, GYT, GTV, and BS11. In the United States, Adult Swim's Toonami programming block aired the series in English dubbed from January 21 to April 14, 2024.

In February 2023, a new animation project was announced. It was later revealed in July 2024 to be six animated short films which centered on the daily lives of the characters from the series. In January 2025, the new project was announced to be titled Lycoris Recoil: Friends are thieves of time and the staff in each short was unveiled. The short films were released on Aniplex's YouTube channel and other platforms from April 16 to May 21, 2025. Aniplex of America released all six short films English dubbed to its YouTube channel on June 7, 2025.

== Series overview ==
Season	Episodes	Originally released	
Season	Episodes	First released	Last released
1	13	July 2, 2022	September 24, 2022
FTT	6	April 16, 2025	May 21, 2025

== Episodes ==
=== Season 1 (2022) ===
No.	Title	Directed by	Written by	Storyboarded by	Chief animation directed by	Original release date	English air date
1	"Easy does it"	Yūsuke Shibata	Shingo Adachi	Shingo Adachi	Yumiko Yamamoto	July 2, 2022	January 21, 2024
Behind Japan's prolonged period of peace, lies the intelligence organization Direct Attack (DA), which employs young orphaned girls known as "Lycoris" to covertly eliminate criminals and terrorists. Lycoris Takina Inoue is dismissed from DA and partnered with Chisato Nishikigi after disobeying orders, risking the life of fellow Lycoris Erika Janome. She reports to one of DA's front operations, Café LycoReco, run by its owner Mika and former DA agent Mizuki Nakahara. Meanwhile, DA investigates a hacker named "Walnut" who breached their systems, as well as weapons which went missing from an arms deal. Chisato informs Takina that their job is to help others in need any way they can while showing her around. While protecting Saori Shinohara from a stalker, they realize she accidentally caught the ongoing arms deal in a picture she took. Takina uses Saori as a decoy to lure out the terrorists stalking her, but Chisato nonlethally subdues them before she can kill them. Meanwhile, a man from the Alan Institute who hired Walnut to spy on Chisato presumably kills him after bombing his apartment. The next day, Takina officially becomes LycoReco's newest waitress, and the man from the Alan Institute visits, who Mika recognizes.
2	"The more the merrier"	Tomohisa Onoue	Shingo Adachi	Takahiro Miura	Yukari Takeuchi	July 9, 2022	January 28, 2024
Walnut is revealed to have survived the attempt on his life, and discovers fellow hacker Robota has betrayed him. Walnut then contacts Mizuki. Meanwhile, the man from the Alan Institute is revealed to be Mr. Yoshimatsu, who is a regular at the café. Chisato and Takina are tasked to protect Walnut from assassins hired by Robota and escort him to safety. They meet Walnut, who hides his identity by wearing a squirrel costume. Chisato and Takina fight off his assassins, with Chisato even aiding those they have injured. However, Walnut is gunned down by another team of assassins as they escape. Robota reports his success to Yoshimatsu. Meanwhile, as Chisato and Takina are taking Walnut's body away, they are shocked when Mizuki emerges from the suit, having acted as Walnut's body double in a bulletproof vest. She and Mika formulated an elaborate plan to fake Walnut's death, and the real Walnut reveals herself as a young girl named Kurumi. For her own safety, Kurumi decides to take shelter in LycoReco in return for using her skills to support Chisato and Takina on their missions. Chisato requests Kurumi's help to track down the arms dealers captured in Saori's photo.
3	"More haste, less speed"	Yūsuke Maruyama	Dai Hazeyama	Shingo Adachi & Yūsuke Maruyama	Gō Suzuki & Kōji Akitaka	July 16, 2022	February 4, 2024
Despite having worked at LycoReco for some time now, Takina still remains distant from Chisato and the café regulars. When Chisato has to return to DA headquarters for a physical exam, Takina decides to accompany her to try and petition Commander Kusunoki to reinstate her. However, upon arriving at HQ, Takina is bullied by the other Lycoris due to false rumors she enjoys firing on her teammates. To her dismay, her previous team leader Fuki Harukawa has already replaced Takina with Sakura Otome and Kusunoki has no intention of allowing Takina to return to DA headquarters. This angers Chisato as she has figured out DA's advanced AI Radiata was hacked during the mission, and Kusunoki used Takina as a scapegoat to cover up the hack. Chisato encourages Takina by suggesting she should try giving life outside DA a try first. Chisato and Takina participate in a mock battle against Fuki and Sakura, with Chisato and Takina defeating them thanks to their teamwork and Chisato's near-superhuman ability to instantly predict bullet trajectories. As they return to LycoReco, Takina has a newfound respect for Chisato and decides to attend a game session with her and the café regulars.
4	"Nothing seek, nothing find"	Tetsuya Takeuchi	Yūsuke Kanbayashi	Tetsuya Takeuchi	Gō Suzuki & Kōji Akitaka	July 23, 2022	February 11, 2024
After unsuccessfully trying out Chisato's rubber bullets, Takina decides to aim at non-vital organs with regular bullets at Chisato's suggestion. Chisato decides to take her shopping for clothes, and visit a restaurant and aquarium, as she wishes for Takina to get used to her life outside work. When asked by Takina, Chisato explains she voluntarily refrains from killing, and left the DA in order to search for somebody who helped her ten years prior. After enjoying her time with Chisato, Takina begins embracing her life outside the DA. Meanwhile, Mika and Yoshimatsu meet again, and Mika wonders why Yoshimatsu has never admitted he is the one who inducted Chisato into the Alan Institute, but Yoshimatsu says it is against their policy. As Takina and Chisato return to LycoReco, a terrorist named Majima opens fire on a subway train, only to be ambushed by a Lycoris team inside, who guns his men down. Cornered, Majima detonates explosives. Robota contacts him, offering his help in combating the Lycoris, but Majima refuses. After the government covers up his attack, a frustrated Majima resolves to hit an even bigger target which will be impossible for the government to cover up.
5	"So far, so good"	Akiko Seki	Takahiro Shikama	Takahiro Shikama	Yukari Takeuchi	July 30, 2022	February 18, 2024
A month after Majima's terrorist attack, Chisato briefs her coworkers of their new mission, which consists of escorting a terminally ill magnate named Matsushita, who is unable to walk, around Japan. They give him a tour around Tokyo, where Chisato confirms to Takina she possesses an artificial heart. Meanwhile, two investigators discover evidence of a terrorist attack in the subway. Kurumi identifies an assassin, Jin, following Matsushita, who Mika remembers working with fifteen years prior. Takina attempts to intercept Jin as Matsushita breaks away from Chisato. Matsushita reveals Jin killed his family, and their real mission is revenge. Chisato succeeds in immobilizing Jin after he injures Takina, but Matsushita appears and demands she kill him. After she refuses to do so, Matsushita's machines suddenly stop working, killing him. In the debriefing, Mika explains "Matsushita" was merely the body of an old drug addict used as a puppet through the machines in his wheelchair. The person controlling him is someone from the Alan Institute, who decides to change their plans. That night, Majima and his men ambush and kill a Lycoris, with him exclaiming she will be the first of many.
6	"Opposites attract"	Takashi Sakuma	Takahiro Shikama	Takahiro Shikama	Yumiko Yamamoto	August 6, 2022	February 25, 2024
After several more violent attacks on Lycoris agents and the government declared martial law against terrorism, Takina decides to live with Chisato to ensure their safety. Meanwhile, a disgruntled Majima barges into Robota's apartment, giving him three days to find DA headquarters. He locates Chisato's home with his drone, and records her stopping the assailants he sent. Majima arrives to kill Robota for failing his initial mission, but spares him after seeing Chisato's footage. At LycoReco, Kurumi reveals she is the hacker responsible for the DA ordeal and Takina's dismissal, but she is not responsible for the arms deal. She shows them Robota's footage of Chisato. Later, Majima ambushes her, and during their fight, he compromises her eyes. Majima notices her Alan Institute necklace, garnering his interest. Takina arrives and rescues Chisato, and as they escape, Kurumi crashes her drone into an RPG-carrying lackey, causing him to blast Majima, who survives. Back at LycoReco, Takina does not blame Kurumi for what happened, taking responsibility for her own actions. Kurumi assures her allegiance, as she reveals they now know Majima's name. Meanwhile, Majima confronts Robota again and orders him to dig up more information on Chisato.
7	"Time will tell"	Yūsuke Shibata	Dai Hazeyama	Yūsuke Shibata	Kōji Akitaka & Rina Morita	August 13, 2022	March 3, 2024
Chisato happens to spot an anonymous text sent to Mika's phone by chance. Fearing Kusunoki plans to close down LycoReco, Chisato convinces her coworkers to help her spy on the meeting. Meanwhile, Robota provides more information on Chisato to Majima. Majima, who is responsible for the old radio tower attack, finally realizes Chisato defeated him. He then assaults a police station. Fuki and Sakura show the surveillance footage to the rest of LycoReco, which finally identifies Majima. Chisato and the others tail Mika to a high-class bar where they find out he is meeting Yoshimatsu. Realizing Mika is a homosexual, Chisato decides to leave but she discovers it was Yoshimatsu who saved her life ten years ago. She breaks her cover and thanks Yoshimatsu, but he denies his involvement before leaving. Mika threatens Yoshimatsu to leave Chisato alone, but he cannot bring himself to stop him. He later apologizes to Chisato for hiding the truth from her. The next day, Chisato returns to LycoReco as usual, to the relief of Mika and Takina. Later, it is shown that Majima left a USB at the station during his assault, allowing Robota to hack DA's database.
8	"Another day, another dollar"	Kakushi Ifuku	Yūsuke Kanbayashi	Kagetsu Aizawa	Gō Suzuki	August 20, 2022	March 10, 2024
Yoshimatsu explains to Himegama, his secretary, that the Alan Institute determines the future of people with special abilities. He then asks her to take care of Chisato. As LycoReco is incurring monetary losses, Takina takes over the finances. Due to the café's success, Chisato cannot attend her medical checkups. When she finally does, she is cornered by Majima at her house. He retells his assault on the old radio tower and how she stopped him, revealing he possesses supernatural hearing. A shocked Chisato says the Alan Institute supports people for good purposes, but Majima reveals they only support people whose abilities may be used for killing. As he leaves, he is engaged by Takina, but manages to escape. Back at the café, Takina and Chisato reflect on what has happened since Takina's arrival. She gifts Chisato a dog keychain, and she learns Chisato's reluctance to attend checkups is due to her fear of needles. She attends her checkup, but is instead immobilized by Himegama, who prepares to remove her artificial heart, just as a worried Takina rushes to her aid. Meanwhile, Yoshimatsu declares to himself that everything to come is Mika's fault.
9	"What's done is done"	Yūsuke Maruyama	Yūsuke Kanbayashi	Atsushi Ōtsuki	Yumiko Yamamoto	August 27, 2022	March 17, 2024
Takina manages to force Himegama to flee, but she still applied a high voltage discharge into Chisato's heart, giving her only two more months to live. This devastates Takina, but an unfazed Chisato returns to her daily life. Kusunoki recruits Chisato for a raid on Majima's hideout, but she only agrees if she reinstates Takina. Kurumi has Mika reveal that ten years ago, Chisato suffered from a congenital heart disease that only gave her six months to live. Seeing her potential, Yoshimatsu arranged for Chisato to receive an artificial heart, under the condition Mika raised her like their own daughter and ensured she used her talent for killing. However, Chisato saw Yoshimatsu as her "savior", and thus used her abilities for good. Takina and Mizuki overhear the story, and they all agree the best way of tracking down Yoshimatsu is through Majima. Meanwhile, Majima learns about Yoshimatsu. Takina decides to return to DA to help Chisato, and arranges for a day off to spend time with her. After visiting the park, she thanks Takina and gives her her scarf as a present before leaving. Meanwhile, Yoshimatsu and Himegama are ambushed and captured by Majima.
10	"Repay evil with evil"	Tomohisa Onoue	Dai Hazeyama	Shingo Adachi & Tomohiko Itō	Yukari Takeuchi	September 3, 2022	March 24, 2024
Once Chisato announces she is going to close down LycoReco, Mizuki and Kurumi both decide to leave for foreign countries. At DA, Kusunoki reveals Enkuboku, the new radio tower, is Majima's next target, and explains their mission to raid his hideout. Takina confirms the Alan Institute's involvement with Majima after interrogating one of his men. Meanwhile, Majima has taken Yoshimatsu hostage. The Lycoris raid the hideout, but Majima has relocated, boasting to Kusunoki he plans to expose Japan's false peace. The next day, Majima uses Robota's USB in the tower's antenna to broadcast to all of Japan that he has hidden a thousand guns all over Tokyo for anybody to find. Seeing Majima wants to expose DA's existence, DA superiors order Chisato to intervene. Meanwhile, Mika tells Chisato the truth about Yoshimatsu and apologizes for hiding it. However, she is thankful for the situation as she sees them both as her father figures. Kusunoki calls to deploy Chisato, just as they receive a call from Robota telling her where Yoshimatsu is being held, saying he will be killed if she heads to Enkuboku. Trusting Takina and Fuki's abilities, Chisato and Mika prepare to go rescue Yoshimatsu.
11	"Diamond cut diamond"	Akiko Seki	Yūsuke Kanbayashi	Gōichi Iwahata	Yukari Takeuchi & Rina Morita	September 10, 2022 (Note: The eyecatcher for the episode was replaced on September 30, 2022. This change was done to avoid audiences imitating consuming Lycoris as the flower is poisonous.)	March 31, 2024
As the Lycoris prepare to assault the Enkuboku control room, Takina becomes aware that Chisato has gone missing, but does not have enough information to act on. Meanwhile, Kurumi continues to investigate Yoshimatsu, tracing him through the doctor who developed Chisato's artificial heart and learning an improved version had been developed for her. Kurumi meets back up with Mizuki and hacks Chisato's phone, learning Yoshimatsu is being held at the ruins of the old radio tower. Realizing Chisato is going into a trap, Takina abandons the operation to head for the old radio tower. The Lycoris proceed with their assault, but it turns out to be a trap when Robota hacks Radiata and broadcasts the fighting live to all of Japan, exposing DA's existence. At the old radio tower, Chisato fights her way through Majima's men and finds Yoshimatsu, who is able to escape. However, Majima traps Chisato in a closed room with no light, neutralizing her prediction ability while allowing him to exploit his advanced hearing. While Majima initially has the upper hand, Takina breaches a hole through the wall, allowing light to enter the room and putting Chisato back on equal footing with Majima.
12	"Nature versus nurture"	Yūsuke Shibata	Yūsuke Kanbayashi	Kagetsu Aizawa	Yumiko Yamamoto	September 17, 2022	April 7, 2024
After Chisato deafens Majima with her guns, she and Takina are able to incapacitate and restrain him. Once Chisato finds Yoshimatsu, they talk about the misunderstanding about saving Chisato's life and their personal views. Yoshimatsu then reveals he has implanted the new artificial heart into himself, meaning she has to kill him to access it. However, Chisato refuses, and prevents an enraged Takina from killing him and Himegama. When Takina asks why she did not kill Yoshimatsu, Chisato explains her reasoning. Mizuki and Kurumi pick them up and inform them LilyBell agents have been deployed to dispose of the Lycoris at Enkuboku for being exposed. Chisato and Takina help Fuki's team in seizing the control room, and Chisato plugs in an override USB Kurumi gave her. With it, Kurumi readopts her Walnut persona and counter-hacks Robota, getting him arrested and reactivating Radiata, which broadcasts a message explaining the gunfight at Enkuboku was an elaborate publicity stunt. With DA's secret safe, the government calls off the LilyBell. As Takina and the other Lycoris prepare to leave Enkuboku, Majima suddenly arrives, having freed himself from his captors. With the Lycoris absent, Chisato and Majima face off again.
13	"Recoil of Lycoris"	Yūsuke Maruyama	Yūsuke Kanbayashi	Shingo Adachi	Yumiko Yamamoto, Rina Morita & Gō Suzuki	September 24, 2022	April 14, 2024
Majima shuts down the power to Enkuboku to prevent anybody from interfering with his duel with Chisato. Meanwhile, Takina decides to scale the tower to help Chisato while Fuki takes an injured Sakura for treatment. Chisato and Majima prove to be equally matched until Chisato's heart begins to malfunction. As such, Majima calls for a temporary truce before they resume their battle. Back at the old radio tower, a healthy Mika confronts Himegama and Yoshimatsu before he incapacitates Himegama and reluctantly kills Yoshimatsu. In Enkuboku, Majima manages to injure Chisato before Takina intervenes and ultimately saves Chisato. Sometime after the Enkuboku incident, society largely accepted Radiata's cover story and life goes back to normal. DA continues to track down the guns Majima hid throughout the city and Majima himself is revealed to still be alive. Elsewhere, Takina tracks down Chisato explaining Mika recovered the new heart from Yoshimatsu. However, Mika kept secret how he was able to obtain it. When Takina asks Chisato what she wants to do now, she decides to travel to Hawaii. The rest of the LycoReco staff later joins them in a mobile café truck.

== Friends are thieves of time (2025) ==
No.	Title	Directed by	Written by	Storyboarded by	Animation directed by	Original release date	English release date
1	"Take it easy"	Takashi Sakuma	Shingo Adachi	Takashi Sakuma	Yumiko Yamamoto	April 16, 2025	June 7, 2025
Takina and Chisato prepare for a "Hanami Party" (Note: Flower Viewing Party) at Café LycoReco, with preparation of more cherry blossom teas. Mika asks Chisato to not let Mizuki drink too much. Later, Takina and Chisato talk, and Chisato expresses objection with Takina openly carrying a handgun and ammunition.
2	"Miles away"	Tsuyoshi Tobita	Imigimuru	Adachi Shingo	Yumiko Yamamoto	April 23, 2025	June 7, 2025
Chisato shows Takina travel manuals from places far away like Hawaii. DA calls but Chisato does not take it seriously as they inform her a robbery was reported in the nearby area. Takina picks up the phone instead and tells Chisato about the target. When a robber suddenly busts into the café, they check their phones, realize he is the one they looking for, and Chisato turns the gun on him. Takina works with her to capture the target.
3	"Scintillation of genius"	Kota Mori	Shu Mori	Kota Mori	Rina Morita	April 30, 2025	June 7, 2025
Chisato is intrigued when she discovers Takina wants to come up with a new menu item for the café, with the latter admitting she was inspired after watching The Social Network. Following this, Chisato finds a book of menu ideas she put together. As Chisato continues talking, Takina likes the idea involving a peach and Chisato begins cutting one up. Mizuki soon arrives and notices a rejected item Chisato previously made that looks like poop, which Takina shoves in her face. When Chisato's item is rejected for being boring, Takina goes next. Once she is done, Chisato and Mizuki are very amused due to its raunchy appearance. Kurumi then sees it as well and notices that it looks like a butt.
4	"Watch out!"	Takayuki Kikuchi	Yoshikazu Tominaga	Takayuki Kikuchi	Yū Saitō	May 7, 2025	June 7, 2025
Takina and Kurumi talk about supposed criminal activity from a ghost, then watch surveillance footage which shows Chisato accidentally breaking a plate and Mizuki being drunk and walking in. While Takina says she is not surprised, she sees something which looks like a ghost, then Mika showing off his abs, Kurumi carrying a drunk Mizuki to the shop, and strange images of a creepy stuffed animal appearing. It turns out that Chisato, Mika, and Mizuki were playing a prank on Takina. Later, Takina wonders where Kurumi went. When the others tell her that Kurumi has not been back since that morning and that they had not seen her, however, they start losing it.
5	"Bittersweet first love"	Motoki Nakanishi	Ken Yamamoto	Motoki Nakanishi	Hiroaki Gōda	May 14, 2025	June 7, 2025
Fuki and Sakura Otome spend the night at the café, and Chisato turns it into a pajama party. Chisato lets Sakura try her uniform, to the annoyance of Fuki and Takina. Later that night, Takina tries on Chisato's uniform herself while she poses with her gun. When Sakura sees this, an embarrassed Takina quickly shoots at her to trap and bind Sakura so she cannot speak, changes into her normal uniform, and tells Chisato and Fuki there was a thief who ran to the café entrance. As Chisato and Fuki accost Mizuki, thinking she is the thief, Takina threatens Sakura to remain silent about the matter. Both Kurumi and Mika are annoyed by the commotion happening in the middle of the night.
6	"Brief respite"	Masayuki Sakoi	Shingo Adachi	Masayuki Sakoi	Yukie Akiya & Hisako Tsurukubo	May 21, 2025	June 7, 2025
When some schoolgirls come into the café late at night, Takina threatens them. It is later revealed they are big fans of her and Lycoris in general. Takina almost reveals everything but Chisato tries to make up for it. Mika gives the girls some snacks and they talk about the movie they watched about the Lycoris. After Erika Janome and Fuki arrive, the schoolgirls see the resemblance. Chisato suggests that the Lycoris come up with new uniforms and she shares some designs on a projector, but Fuki keeps rejecting them. With Takina, Chisato, Kurumi, and Mizuki wearing clothing for their trip to Hawaii, Fuki thinks that Mika will be different, but she is shocked to see him dressed down. Those inside see what he looks like and laugh at how absurd it is.

== Home media release ==
=== Japanese ===
Aniplex (Japan – Region 2/A)
Vol.	Episodes	Release date	Ref.
1	1–3	September 21, 2022	
2	4–5	October 26, 2022	
3	6–7	November 23, 2022	
4	8–9	December 21, 2022	
5	10–11	January 25, 2023	
6	12–13	February 22, 2023	

=== English ===
Aniplex of America (North America – Region 1/A)
Season	Episodes	Release date	Ref.
1	1–13	September 19, 2023	

Sugoi Co (via Madman Entertainment) (Australia – Region 4/B)
Season	Episodes	Release date	Ref.
1	1–13	July 22, 2025	
