= Blood phobia =

Irrational fear of blood or bloody wounds

- Other names: Hemophobia
- Specialty: Psychiatry, clinical psychology

Blood phobia (also known as hemophobia or hematophobia in American English and haemophobia or haematophobia in British English) is an extreme fear of blood, a type of specific phobia. Severe cases of this fear can cause physical reactions that are uncommon in most other fears, specifically vasovagal syncope (fainting). Similar reactions can also occur with trypanophobia and traumatophobia. For this reason, these phobias are categorized as blood-injection-injury type phobia by the DSM-IV. Some early texts refer to this category as "blood-injury-illness phobia."

== Causes ==
Blood phobia is often caused by direct or vicarious trauma in childhood. Though some have suggested a possible genetic link, a study of twins suggests that social learning and traumatic events, rather than genetics, is of greater significance. Blood-injection-injury phobia (BII) affects about 4% of the population in the United States.

The inclusion of BII within the category of specific or simple phobias in classificatory systems reflects a perception that fear has a primary role in the disorder. Consistent with this assumption, blood-injury phobia appears to share a common etiology with other phobias. Kendler, Neale, Kessler, Heath, and Eaves (1992) have argued from data comparing monozygotic with dizygotic twins that the genetic factor common to all phobias (agoraphobia, social phobia, and specific phobias), strongly predisposes a person to specific phobias.

The recognition of an inherited vulnerability common to all phobias is consistent with the notion that elevated trait anxiety predisposes one to anxiety disorders. Trait anxiety provides a background of affective arousal that permits a more rapid activation of the fight or flight response. With respect to specific activating events, conditioning is one way that stimuli become able to elicit anxiety. It is believed that these changes are controlled by the vagus nerve, which affects activity in the chest and abdomen.

Accordingly, painful experiences can condition fear to blood-injury stimuli. Investigators typically classify around 60% of self-reported onsets of blood-injury phobia as beginning with conditioning experiences. However, examinations of available case-by-case verbal summaries call into question the conclusion that conditioning episodes are as prevalent as reported. For example, Thyer et al. (1985) identified a conditioning episode when a "patient received an injection at age 13 and fainted", and in another person when "at age six she heard her elementary school teacher give a talk on the circulatory system. This frightened the patient to the point of syncope."

== Symptoms ==
=== Physical ===
- Rapid heart rate
- Trouble breathing
- Shaking or trembling
- Tightness or pain in chest
- Lightheadedness
- Sweating
- Hot or cold flashes
- Vomiting

=== Emotional ===
- Extreme feelings of anxiety or panic
- Overwhelming need to escape situations involving blood
- Feeling as if one will die or pass out
- Concerned of control loss

== Treatment ==
The standard approach to treatment is the same as with other phobias—cognitive-behavioral therapy, desensitization, and possibly medications to help with the anxiety and discomfort. In recent years, the technique known as applied tension, applying tension to the muscles in an effort to increase blood pressure, has increasingly gained favor as an often effective treatment for blood phobia associated with drops in blood pressure and fainting.

== See also ==
- List of phobia
- Phobia
- Specific phobia
