= Mayo Chiki! =

Japanese light novel series

- Cover of the first light novel volume, featuring Subaru Konoe

まよチキ!
- Genre: Romantic comedy
- Light novel
- Written by: Hajime Asano
- Illustrated by: Seiji Kikuchi
- Published by: Media Factory
- Imprint: MF Bunko J
- Original run: November 25, 2009 – July 25, 2012
- Volumes: 12
- Manga
- Written by: Hajime Asano
- Illustrated by: NEET
- Published by: Media Factory
- English publisher: NA: Seven Seas Entertainment
- Magazine: Monthly Comic Alive
- Original run: July 27, 2010 – November 27, 2013
- Volumes: 7
- Manga

Mayo Mayo!
- Written by: Yū Eichi
- Published by: Kadokawa Shoten
- Magazine: Nyantype
- Original run: November 30, 2010 – October 29, 2011
- Volumes: 2
- Anime television series
- Directed by: Keiichiro Kawaguchi
- Written by: Reiko Yoshida
- Music by: Yukari Hashimoto
- Studio: Feel
- Licensed by: AUS: Madman Entertainment; NA: Sentai Filmworks; UK: MVM Films
- Original network: TBS, MBS, CBC, BS-i
- English network: US: Anime Network
- Original run: July 7, 2011 – September 29, 2011
- Episodes: 13

Mayo Chiki! (まよチキ!) is a Japanese light novel series written by Hajime Asano and illustrated by Seiji Kikuchi. Media Factory published twelve volumes of the series from November 2009 to July 2012 under their MF Bunko J imprint. A manga adaptation illustrated by NEET was serialized in Media Factory's seinen manga magazine, Comic Alive from July 2010 to November 2013. A spin-off manga series titled Mayo Mayo! (まよマヨ!) was serialized in Kadokawa Shoten's magazine Nyantype from November 2010 to October 2011. An anime television series adaptation by Feel aired in Japan from July to September 2011. Mayo Chiki! is an abbreviation of Mayoeru Shitsuji to Chikin na Ore to (迷える執事とチキンな俺と; "The Hesitant Butler and Cowardly Me"). The anime is licensed by Sentai Filmworks in North America.

== Plot ==
The story is about Kinjirō Sakamachi, a 16-year-old high school boy who has gynophobia (abnormal fear of women), which makes his nose bleed every time he has physical contact with a female. While using the men's washroom, he accidentally discovers the popular and handsome butler, Subaru Konoe, is a girl. Now Kinjirō knows about Subaru's secret, he must work together with Subaru and her sadistic mistress, Kanade Suzutsuki, to protect Subaru's secret from being discovered.

== Characters ==
Kinjirō Sakamachi (坂町 近次郎, Sakamachi Kinjirō)
Voiced by: Satoshi Hino (Japanese); Blake Shepard (English)
A second-year high school student who discovers Subaru's secret. Frequently referred to simply as Jirō, he suffers gynophobia resulting in nosebleeds whenever a girl touches him. This is the result of the abuse he suffered from both his mother and sister using him as a dummy to practice wrestling; seeing him bleed was the only thing that stopped them, so his nosebleeds are self defensive.
Subaru Konoe (近衛 スバル, Konoe Subaru)
Voiced by: Yuka Iguchi (Japanese); Genevieve Simmons (English)
A second-year high school student who works as a butler for the Suzutsuki family and suffers from aichmophobia. When she was young she was noted to be antisocial and was not close to anyone, which worried her mother. She dresses as a male due to her family's tradition of serving Kanade's family as a butler.
Kanade Suzutsuki (涼月 奏, Suzutsuki Kanade)
Voiced by: Eri Kitamura (Japanese); Carli Mosier (English)
The daughter and only child of the high school's principal, who appears to behave as a rich man's polite and elegant daughter, but she is quite sadistic. She enjoys tormenting and teasing Kinjirō by using his gynophobia against him. She does, however, give serious thought to finding a way to cure his gynophobia. Although her methods tend to be overly complicated or humiliating in some way, she does not deny she finds them amusing.
Kureha Sakamachi (坂町 紅羽, Sakamachi Kureha)
Voiced by: Kana Hanazawa (Japanese); Caitlynn French (English)
Kureha is Kinjirō's younger sister who is a first-year in high school and loves wrestling. She is a member of the handcrafting club. After watching and following Kinjirō and Subaru, believing him a male pervert cross-dresser, she attacks Subaru to reclaim Kinjirō, only to be quickly defeated. After this incident, and still believing Subaru to be male, she falls in love with Subaru, much to Kinjirō's chagrin. In the manga, she is devastated to learn Subaru is a girl when Subaru announces it.
Masamune Usami (宇佐美 マサムネ, Usami Masamune)
Voiced by: Mariya Ise (Japanese); Margaret McDonald (English)
Usami is a member of the Shooting Star Subaru-Sama fan club (or the S4), but quit afterward and is also a member of the handcrafting club. She is shown to have considerable leg power which she uses in the form of kicks. She is also shown to be a good cook, partly because she lives on her own and has to cook her own meals. In the anime, she is annoyed that Jiro became friends with Subaru because he got to do it before she did. While initially annoyed by some of Jiro's traits or lack of abilities which Subaru has, she eventually sees him for who he is and eventually falls in love with him. In the manga, she gets more time alone with Jiro, dates him and even kisses him in the winter time. She also once proposed to Jiro by saying that she wanted him and her "to be a family", which is the Japanese way of saying, "Will you marry me?"
Nakuru Narumi (鳴海 ナクル, Narumi Nakuru)
Voiced by: Kana Asumi (Japanese); Allison Sumrall (English)
The cat-eared student who is spying Kinjirō and Subaru. She is a busty first-year and a member of the crafts club along with Kureha, she is also revealed to be the chairman of the "Let's warmly protect Subaru-Sama committee" (Serve Subaru Observational Committee in the English dub) and is shown to have a fetish for glasses and boy love, which is expressed through her manga drawing of Kinjirō and Subaru, much to their chagrin.
Nagare Konoe (近衛 流, Konoe Nagare)
Voiced by: Keiji Fujiwara (Japanese); David Wald (English)
Subaru's father, head butler of the Suzutsuki family and Kanade's father's butler. He loathes Kinjirō, partly because Subaru ends up explaining he accidentally groped her and he is suspicious of his intentions towards Subaru. In the manga, it is revealed that he and Jiro's mother were lovers.
Jirō Sakamachi (坂町 次郎, Sakamachi Jirō)
Voiced by: Eiji Miyashita (Japanese); Christopher Ayres (English)
Kinjirō and Kureha's father, and their mother's coach. He suffered at her hands much as Kinjirō does at his sister's. Before dying from an illness, he asked Kinjirō to become a good man. Kinjirō uses his name so no one will make a fun of his full name.
Schrodinger Narumi (鳴海 シュレディンガー, Shuredingā Narumi)
Schrodinger is Nakuru's older sister. She only appears in the manga adaptation and the light novels. She is very protective of her younger sister and excels in sports. After hearing about him dating her sister, she challenges Kinjirō to a series of events during the sports festival.
Akemi Sakamachi (坂町 明美, Sakamachi Akemi)
Kinjirō and Kureha's mother, and female pro wrestler. She is called "Queen of Knockouts". She has beaten everyone she has sparred with. Now no one wants to face her, she travels around the world fighting dangerous animals. She was involved physically with Subaru's father many years before she eventually met Jiro's father.

== Media ==
=== Novels ===
The first volume of the novel was published on November 25, 2009. Twelve volumes of the novel were published in all by Media Factory under their MF Bunko J imprint.

No.	Release date	ISBN
1	November 25, 2009	978-4-8401-3084-4
2	January 25, 2010	978-4-8401-3155-1
3	April 23, 2010	978-4-8401-3278-7
4	July 23, 2010	978-4-8401-3453-8
5	October 25, 2010	978-4-8401-3550-4
6	January 25, 2011	978-4-8401-3697-6
7	April 25, 2011	978-4-8401-3894-9
8	June 24, 2011	978-4-8401-3940-3
9	September 22, 2011	978-4-8401-4240-3
10	January 25, 2012	978-4-8401-4367-7
11	April 25, 2012	978-4-8401-4547-3
12	July 25, 2012	978-4-8401-4639-5

=== Manga ===
The manga adaptation began its serialization on July 27, 2010, in the Media Factory's seinen manga magazine, Comic Alive. The series was collected into seven manga volumes, published under the Alive Comics imprint. On February 29, 2012, it was announced that the manga would be licensed in English by Seven Seas Entertainment. In all seven volumes were released from December 11, 2012, to September 2, 2014. The series has also been licensed in Taiwan and released through Sharp Point Press.

A spin-off manga of the series titled Mayo Mayo! (まよマヨ!) was published in Kadokawa Shoten's bishōjo magazine, Nyantype.

=== Anime ===
The anime television series was produced by Feel and directed by Keiichiro Kawaguchi. It was broadcast on the Tokyo Broadcasting System from July 7 to September 29, 2011.

==== Episodes ====
No.	Title	Original release date
1	"End of Earth"; Transliteration: "Endo obu Āsu" (Japanese: エンド・オブ・アース)	July 7, 2011
High school student Kinjirō Sakamachi starts his day with a painful awakening from his younger sister Kureha Sakamachi. Upon arrival at school, Subaru Konoe is seen as a student who works as a butler for Kanade Suzutsuki. Kinjirō has gynophobia, the abnormal fear of women, which is shown after a weird encounter with Nakuru Narumi. While cooling off in the restroom, he chances upon Subaru wearing girl's underwear, which results in Subaru chasing Kinjirō to the chemistry lab and attacking him for what he saw. When a jar containing a frog falls from the shelf, Kinjirō jumps in to save Subaru, but Kinjirō discovers that Subaru is a girl after landing on her chest. In response, Subaru throws a fire extinguisher at Kinjirō, which knocks him unconscious. He later wakes up in the infirmary chained to the bed with one hand free next to Kanade, who teases him a bit. She explains that the Konoe family has served the Suzutsuki family through lineage, in which Subaru, as the only child in her generation, must cross-dress as a boy to attend high school and continue serving as a butler. Kanade threatens Kinjirō with her sadistic behavior and forcibly forms a contract with him to keep Subaru's true gender a secret, as well as to find a way to cure his gynophobia.
2	"I Fell in Love!"; Transliteration: "Daisuki ni Nacchatta!" (Japanese: 大好きになっちゃった!)	July 14, 2011
Due to rumors that Kinjirō and Subaru are in a relationship, Kinjirō earns the ire of a fan club named the Shooting Star Subaru-Sama (or the S4), though their attempts are thwarted by a splinter fan club called the Serve Subaru Observational Committee. Kanade has Kinjirō go on a mock date with Subaru at an arcade in an attempt to cure his gynophobia, while giving him a "butler voucher" with a sheep drawing, redeemable for any irrefusable order to Subaru, as an apology for her actions. After winning a sheep plushie for her near the end of the date, Kinjirō redeems the butler voucher and orders Subaru to baa like a sheep, but then she starts violating his personal space while asking for more orders. Kureha, who has been spying on them, suddenly appears, in which she believes that Subaru is a boy cross-dressing as a girl. Subaru easily defeats Kureha in a fight and causes her to run back home. The next day, as Kinjirō and Subaru start bonding as friends, they help each other from exposing their respective secrets, gynophobia and female identity, during a school physical examination, despite the considerable embarrassment they are forced to go through. After the two enjoy lunch together, Kanade appears while Subaru is sleeping, telling Kinjirō that Subaru has finally found her first friend. When Kinjirō returns home, he is shocked when Kureha reveals that she has fallen in love with Subaru.
3	"On the Bed, Of Course"; Transliteration: "Mochiron, Beddo no Uede" (Japanese: もちろん、ベッドの上で)	July 21, 2011
In order to settle an issue, Kanade sets up a double date at the swimming pool with Kinjirō, Subaru and Kureha. Kinjirō is told that Kanade and Subaru were once kidnapped for ransom when they were children. Later, Kinjirō rescues a girl from drowning but then passes out, and a flashback reveals that he was explained by his hospitalized father Jirō Sakamachi that his name means "stand by me" due to the kanji character in his name for "close". When Kinjirō regains consciousness, Subaru receives a phone call from a strange man in a wolf mask, who has kidnapped Kanade and Kureha at an unfinished building. When the kidnapper hangs up after holding a knife, Subaru shivers due to her aichmophobia, the morbid fear of sharp objects, stemming from the traumatizing incident from her childhood, in which she feels inadequate as a butler from her inability to protect Kanade as a child. Kinjirō knocks her out, promising her any favor he will owe to her. When Kinjirō meets the kidnapper at the unfinished building, Kinjirō is unable to land a hit, that is until Subaru shows up and defeats the kidnapper herself, overcoming her aichmophobia. It turns out that the kidnapper is actually Subaru's father Nagare Konoe, in which this incident was orchestrated by Kanade in order to help Subaru overcome her aichmophobia, believing that Kinjirō would help since he could empathize on the matter. Later, Subaru sadly tells Kinjirō not to risk himself again, afraid that her first friend would end up being stabbed. However, Kureha interrupts their moment, inadvertently revealing that Kanade was supposed to be going out with Kinjirō. Subaru immediately reacts with anger, forcing Kinjirō to run away with Kanade from both Subaru and Kureha.
4	"Don't Stare at Me Like That..."; Transliteration: "Anmari Jirojiro Miruna..." (Japanese: あんまりジロジロみるな…)	July 28, 2011
Kinjirō finally begins a cheerful morning with the start of Golden Week, since Kureha has gone to "handcrafting club" camp for three days. However, to his surprise, Subaru, who is dressed up with cat ears and tail, needs a place to stay and act as his butler, because Kanade's father kicked her out of the mansion for the time being. Since Subaru does not want Kinjirō to lie around early in the morning, the two train inside the gym to pass the time. Kinjirō decides to take a bath alone, but Subaru insists on joining him to wash his back. This moment is interrupted when Kureha returns home early from camp due to breaking her arm after she fought a bear, causing a brief misunderstanding when she sees Subaru's undergarments in the wash basket. Kanade arrives as well, deciding to live with Kinjirō and act as his maid, resulting in a brief competition between Subaru and Kanade to determine who is the better servant, but Kinjirō suddenly passes out from a cold. After Subaru attempts to treat him with several questionable cures, Kanade finally explains the situation by taking him to the beach, where it is revealed that Nagare was also kicked out of the mansion due to an ongoing fight with Subaru following the events at the unfinished building. Subaru declines to return to the mansion because she wants to take care of Kinjirō, fearful that she might lose him from an illness just like her late mother. Though lightheaded from his cold, Kinjirō convinces Subaru to make amends with Nagare and return to the mansion together. At the end of Golden Week, Subaru thanks Kinjirō in embarrassment before leaving, in which Kanade notes that this is the first time that Subaru has thanked anyone other than her. Since Kanade states that Kinjirō does not seem like such a chicken anymore, she proceeds to kiss him, the first kiss she will always remember.
5	"Go Out With Me"; Transliteration: "Atashi to Tsukiai Nasai" (Japanese: アタシと付き合いなさい)	August 4, 2011
On the way to school, Kinjirō gets run over by a girl on a scooter, soon noticing that she attends his high school. When he sees that his glasses are caught in her thigh boots, she takes things the wrong way when he asks if he could reach in there, causing her to attack him in response. After Kinjirō retrieves his glasses, the girl introduces herself as Masamune Usami, an acquaintance of Kureha in the handcrafting club, before knocking him out. Kinjirō suddenly wakes up in the infirmary, where Subaru reveals that she found him passed out in the middle of the street and brought him to school. Subaru eventually requests Kinjirō to accompany her to the upcoming school festival. When Kinjirō starts talking about his first kiss and wanting to redo it somehow, Subaru discreetly misconstrues this had to do with her giving him mouth-to-mouth resuscitation while he was unconscious during the swimming pool incident. Kanade interrupts their moment, suggesting to them the theme of a "cross-dressing cosplay cat cafe" for the school festival. Kinjirō later runs into Masamune on the school roof, who reveals that she is actually a member of the S4, but she demands him to be her boyfriend for the school festival, showing evidence regarding the mock date Kinjirō had with Subaru at the arcade as blackmail, in order to undermine the Observational Committee. Subaru, who soon overhears all of this, punches him in the stomach and leaves off in tears. Kinjirō later walks with Masamune to the mall to buy her a swimsuit, though it is quite embarrassing for Kinjirō. They then befriend each other before parting ways to their homes. As the preparations for the school festival are underway the next day, Nakuru is shown spying on Subaru.
6	"Let the War Begin"; Transliteration: "Sensō o Hajimemashō" (Japanese: 戦争を始めましょう)	August 11, 2011
During the school festival, Subaru interrupts Kinjirō and Masamune during their fake date. They are drawn to an animal cafe, where they find Kureha, who is happy to see Masamune. However, Masamune, intimidated by Kureha's carefree and enthusiastic attitude, tells Kinjirō to leave on without her, seeing that he was not enjoying the fake date anyway. Kinjirō is then drawn out by Nakuru, dressed in a sheep mascot costume, and she introduces herself as a handcrafting club member and the chairwoman of the Observational Committee. Nakuru is aware that Masamune is planning to undermine the Observational Committee, especially since Masamune lied about protecting Kinjirō from the S4. Kinjirō explains to Subaru that the two fan clubs are organizing a meeting, which may turn into a war with him stuck in the middle. At the meeting, Kinjirō and Subaru, joining the Observational Committee, are surprised that Kanade is a representative of the S4. The meeting is actually a quiz bowl focused on the subject of Subaru. When the last question regarding who was Subaru's first kiss is asked, Subaru reluctantly reveals the answer as being Kinjirō, referring to the swimming pool incident. After Kanade later informs Kinjirō that Masamune resigned from the S4, Kinjirō finds Masamune alone on the school roof. Masamune, first being able to relate, explains that Subaru has changed in personality from lonely to friendly when Kinjirō entered into the picture. In response, Kinjirō reveals his gynophobia to Masamune and later introduces her to Subaru and Kanade as her new friends. The next day, Masamune vows to help Kinjirō cure his gynophobia, but first she has to be comfortable with him addressing her by her first name.
7	"Let's Elope"; Transliteration: "Kakeochi Shiyou" (Japanese: 駆け落ちしよう)	August 18, 2011
On his way home, Kinjirō is drugged by Subaru with a drink made by Kanade, and he later finds himself in a hot springs resort, where Kanade explains that she has run away from the mansion because her parents decided to travel abroad for summer holidays. It is also mentioned that Kanade told the innkeeper that she was eloping with Kinjirō as a cover story, though Kinjirō is aware that Subaru and Kanade's ulterior motive was to help him cure his gynophobia while at the beach. When Kinjirō goes to the beach cafe to buy a drink, he is surprised to see Kureha, Masamune and Nakuru working there, but that is because they were chased away from their camp by a shark. Subaru and Kanade arrive near the cafe, prompting Kinjirō to have Subaru put on glasses and Kanade to introduce her as Subaru's "cousin" named Punyuru Takanashi in order to protect her identity. Masamune grills Kinjirō for spending time alone with Kanade, who claims that she and Kinjirō are eloping. Masamune disbelieves such as thing because she trusts Kinjirō as her friend, but she also unveils that she cooked meat and potato stew for him at her house and clung onto him while wearing a bikini on the previous day. Subaru overhears this and runs off upset, but as Kinjirō catches up to her, he clarifies that Masamune cooked for him as a favor for the fake date and tried an intimate approach to cure his gynophobia, though Subaru punches him in the stomach for exaggerating the details. As Kanade offers for all the girls to stay at the resort with her, Nagare shows up with the intention of taking Subaru and Kanade back to the mansion, that is until the two coerce him into letting them stay by threatening to call the police for potentially kidnapping "Punyuru". Kinjirō then notices Subaru looking off somewhere with a sad expression on her face.
8	"It's My First Time"; Transliteration: "Hajimete Nanda" (Japanese: 初めてなんだ)	August 25, 2011
Having trouble sleeping due to the sight of the girls around him, Kinjirō goes into the men's bath to calm himself, but Subaru is there as well, since she is protecting her female identity from being discovered. Subaru is forced to hide behind Kinjirō when Nagare also enters the men's bath. Nagare leaves after he is convinced that Kinjirō considers Subaru only as a friend. However, Nagare charges at Kinjirō, after deducing that Subaru is in the men's bath when he found women's underwear in the men's dressing room, but Subaru intercepts Nagare and knocks him out. As she accidentally exposes her body in front of Kinjirō, she becomes embarrassed and knocks him out as well. The next day, Kinjirō and the girls, in which Subaru pretends to be Punyuru again, go to beach to have fun, and then head to the summer festival. After Subaru disappears from the summer festival later on, Kinjirō is directed to the cemetery, where he finds Subaru at her mother's grave. Kinjirō embraces Subaru, who reminisces about her mother always worrying about her being able to make any friends during her childhood, and he asks her to formally introduce him to her mother. The next day, a paintball tournament takes place, in which the winner gets a kiss from Subaru as Punyuru, who won a previous beauty pageant. Nakuru defeats Masamune and Kureha after drinking a soda, which gives her the ability to strip them of their clothes almost instantaneously. Kanade, after using a pair of glasses to lure Nakuru away and then knocking Kinjirō out, is deemed the winner. Kinjirō wakes up to Subaru, and the two watch the fireworks together at the end of the summer festival. As summer vacation comes to an end, Kinjirō anticipates a crazy semester ahead of him, though he is used to his everyday life as being crazy. Kinjirō plans to remain friends with Subaru, but she wants something more than that.
9	"I'm Going On A Journey"; Transliteration: "Shibaraku Tabi ni Demasu" (Japanese: しばらく旅に出ます)	September 1, 2011
Kinjirō finds himself working part-time at a maid cafe to repay Masamune for the loan of her summer homework. After the manager teases Kinjirō of being Masamune's boyfriend, he recalls Subaru telling him to ignore what she said about wanting to be more than just being friends. Kanade comes to see Kinjirō, leaving Subaru behind, but Masamune is not pleased to see Kanade at all. To make matters more complicated, Kureha and Nakuru also show up to help out at the maid cafe. Meanwhile, Subaru frantically searches for Kanade, only to be mistaken as a waitress at a butler cafe, having to work there part-time. Kinjirō faints after he trips and grabs onto Masamune, but when the manager checks up on him after he wakes up, Kanade stirs up drama by saying that Kinjirō has a kink for maid outfits. Kanade pressures Masamune into lifting up her skirt to expose her garter belt to test that theory. Fortunately, Subaru finally finds Kanade to take her back to the mansion, but Kinjirō catches up to Subaru, who clarifies that she wants nothing more than to be his best friend. When Kinjirō returns to the maid cafe, Masamune invites him to continue working there and offers him to copy her school notes anytime. Kinjirō discovers the special ringtone that Masamune has set for his contact number on her cellphone when she accidentally dropped it, but he runs away from her when she finds out about this.
10	"Thank You For The Meal"; Transliteration: "Ittadakkimāsu" (Japanese: いっただっきまーす)	September 8, 2011
Kureha celebrates her sixteenth birthday with Nakuru and Masamune at Masamune's house, which is soon noted to be haunted, much to Kureha's worry. However, Kureka is relieved when she receives a pair of glasses from Nakuru and a poster of Subaru from Masamune. Nakuru and Masamune act out a romantic skit of a spoof involving Kinjirō and Subaru, which is too much for Masamune to handle. Later on, the three go to the maid cafe, meeting up with Subaru and Kanade there. Kureha is happy when she is given a birthday cake and the waitresses sing her a birthday song. She recalls Kinjirō giving her a brown teddy bear for her eighth birthday. She then plays an originally developed arcade video game with Kanade, with Kinjirō and Kureha being the playable characters. While Subaru and Kanade takes her home, Kureha recalls that Kinjirō came to the playground to take her home for her tenth birthday, after a spat she had with her mother. Kinjirō played video games with her all day on her twelfth birthday, he got her ice cream at a dairy ranch on her thirteenth birthday and he burned firecrackers with her in the backyard on her fourteenth birthday. However, Kureha was frustrated when Kinjirō disregarded her fifteenth birthday for a concert event that took place all day. Realizing that Kinjirō has been there for her during her childhood, Kureha strives to be more independent. When she returns home, she is surprised that he remembered her sixteenth birthday, giving her a white teddy bear as a present to make up for last year's mistake.
11	"Nyu!"; Transliteration: "Nyu!" (Japanese: にゅ!)	September 15, 2011
It is the start of the new semester, and Subaru still has Kinjirō in her mind. While walking to school together, Kinjirō and Subaru almost get run over by Masamune with her scooter. During lunchtime, Kanade brings a delicious meal to share with Kinjirō and Subaru. Due to the food containing white wine, Subaru becomes slightly drunk, and Kinjirō is dismayed when Kanade rubs some sauce on his neck to have Subaru lick it off. After he takes Subaru to the infirmary, he later takes Kanade to the infirmary there as well when she begins to experience an episode of hiccups. These hiccups are her constant weakness because it makes her so cute, in which they have caused major chaos in the mansion in the past. Kanade tells Subaru to get the tools needed for the hiccup treatment, giving Kanade the chance to seduce Kinjirō, but he pushes his way out and bumps into Subaru. After Kanade seemingly has stopped hiccuping, the three walk down the hallway, that is until Kanade suddenly falls down a flight of stairs and injures her ankle. At the hospital, Subaru blames herself for not being able to prevent Kanade from falling. Nagare shows up to relieves Subaru of her duties as a butler, but Kanade insists that Subaru must remain as her butler. Subaru flees with guilt, and Kinjirō follows her to an overpass. Subaru runs away after thanking Kinjirō with a kiss on the cheek, which leaves Kinjirō passed out with a nosebleed.
12	"The Hesitant Butler and I, the Chicken"; Transliteration: "Mayoeru Shitsuji to Chikin'na Ore to" (Japanese: 迷える執事とチキンな俺と)	September 22, 2011
Kinjirō is woken up by Masamune on the overpass, and she gives him a ride to the inn of the hot spring resort, after he remembers that is where Subaru watched the fireworks during the summer vacation. As Kinjirō and Subaru spend the night there, Subaru wonders if Kinjirō would do more than just kiss. He takes it the wrong way, assuming she was referring to making love, when instead she just wanted to sleep closer to him. The next morning, Kanade picks the two up and takes them to their homes. When Kinjirō arrives at school and asks Kanade where Subaru is, he is shocked when Kanade tells him that Subaru has transferred schools. However, Subaru comes to the school as a transfer student dressed as Punyuru, while Kinjirō has to walk Kanade to class. During lunchtime, Subaru admits that she enjoys being a butler more than being a normal girl. With that in mind, Kinjirō riskily enlists the help of the S4 to get petitions signed so that Subaru can become a butler again. The next day, Subaru reprises her duties as a butler for Kanade, in which Kanade makes up a cover story about Punyuru transferring to another school again. Later that night, Subaru summons Kinjirō to the park, where she thanks him by forcefully planting a kiss on his lips. Kinjirō subsequently gets a nosebleed and passes out, later reflecting on how long their adventures as an indecisive butler and a chicken will last.
13	"Please Massage Them!"; Transliteration: "Monde Kudasai!" (Japanese: 揉んでください!)	September 29, 2011
Kinjirō wonders why there is a yaoi magazine mixed in his secret stash of magazines located under his bed. Nakuru shows up at his doorstep unannounced, letting slip that she was on his bed on the previous night. A series of flashbacks are told from Nakuru's point of view. Subaru notices a camera flash from the top of a building adjacent to the mansion while she is taking a bath, and after rushing over there in hopes of protecting her identity, she discovers that Nakuru is the photographer. At the butler cafe, Nakuru shows Subaru that the photo came out too foggy to decipher, in that she needed one to be sold in order to help publish her yaoi novels. Kanade shows up and donates some photos of Subaru in her butler suit for Nakuru to sell. Later at Kinjirō's house, Nakuru has Kureha and Masamune put together copies of her yaoi novels. As Nakuru compensates Kureha with some photos of Subaru, Kureha allows Nakuru and Masamune inside Kinjirō's room, which is when Nakuru placed the yaoi magazine in the stash of the other magazines. Subaru and Kanade later come by, and Subaru efficiently staples the novels. Nakuru hesitates when she asks Subaru a question left untold. Later, Kureha and Masamune go undercover and follow Nakuru to various places, including a book fair where she sold out all of her yaoi novels, and they take notice that she was viewing romance novels. After they realize that Nakuru may be in love, their cover is blown, but Nakuru still hesitates to tell them. As the flashback ends, Nakuru asks Kinjirō out on a date to a boardwalk, where she eventually admits to having a complex with her breasts, since she turned down a confession from a boy in the past assuming that to be the reason. Kinjirō unwillingly agrees to help her by enduring close bodily contact, but this causes Nakuru to develop feelings for Kinjirō, having to flee from embarrassment.

== Reception ==
Theron Martin of Anime News Network criticized the series for its indistinguishable animation and for not deviating away enough from its given genre, but concluded that "[I]t delivers just enough on its humor, character development, fan service, and charm to be entertaining, however, and for series like this, that's enough."
