= List of Welcome to Irabu's Office episodes =

This is a list of television episodes from the Japanese cartoon series Welcome to Irabu's Office (空中ブランコ, Kūchū Buranko; Japanese for "Flying Trapeze"), based on the Psychiatrist Irabu series of short stories. The only season of the show aired between October 15 and December 24, 2009, and consisted of 11 episodes, half hour per episode. It has been released on DVD with English subtitles in region 4 on February 18, 2011.

== Episode list ==
No.	Title	Original release date
1	"Flying trapeze" Transliteration: "Kūchū Buranko" (Japanese: 空中ブランコ)	October 15, 2009
Kohei Yamashita is an aerialist who repeatedly misses his partners in his trapeze act. He blames the newly recruited foreign circus artists and grows distant and distrusting of them. Due to the stress of getting his act together for an upcoming performance, he has developed a sleep disorder and anxiety problems. He is a third-generation circus performer after his father and grandfather. As a child, he learned to distance himself from other children because he had to constantly move with the circus. Because of this, he couldn't develop trust in strangers. He realizes that he was the one messing up the stunt after watching a video of his practice. He is represented by a penguin.
2	"keep on erecting" Transliteration: "Tachippanashi" (Japanese: 勃ちっぱなし)	October 22, 2009
Tetsuya Taguchi, public servant at the ward office, has developed an erectile dysfunction (a constantly erect penis) due to emotional issues at work and with his ex-wife. He is represented by a rhino with a dotted horn.
3	"Romance novelist" Transliteration: "Ren'ai Shōsetsuka" (Japanese: 恋愛小説家)	October 29, 2009
Romance novelist Junichi Hoshiyama suffering from OCD and psychogenic induced vomiting. He believes that he has already done the ideas that come to his head for new books. His animal form is a rooster and the scenes of vomiting are overlaid by pink feathers flying through the air.
4	"The third base" Transliteration: "Hotto Kōnā" (Japanese: ホットコーナー)	November 5, 2009
Shinichi Bando, a superstar pro-baseball player and third baseman for the Tokyo Yakult Swallows, is troubled by yips as he suddenly can not throw the ball anymore. This problem is brought on by a younger and more popular contender for his position on the team. He appears as a red horse with blue hair after the vitamin shot.
5	"My Father-in-Law's..."; Transliteration: "Gifu no Are" (Japanese: 義父のアレ)	November 12, 2009
Tatsuro Ikeyama is a neurology lecturer with obsessive–compulsive disorder and a compulsion for inappropriate behavior. For example, he fantasizes about dumping the load of a dump truck stopped at a traffic light and swinging on a chandelier at his school reunion. His father-in-law is Dr. Nomura, the faculty head at his university and the head of the university hospital's surgical department. The treatment that Irabu prescribes for Ikeyama includes farting in a crowded elevator, changing the television channel to a baseball game while his extended family is watching opera, and finally, removing his father-in-law's wig in public. The cause of his compulsions is his controlled lifestyle; before he was married, he enjoyed playing pranks and watched baseball instead of opera. After his vitamin shot, Tatsuro appears as a multi-colored chameleon who often turns invisible.
6	"Friends"; Transliteration: "Furenzu" (Japanese: フレンズ)	November 19, 2009
Yuta Tsuda is a high school student who suffers from a mobile phone addiction. He panics and suffers withdrawal when he is not on his phone. When he gets his phone confiscated in class, he goes home instantly and asks his mom to get a new one. Irabu starts to text him on his phone after getting one himself. Yuta asks Mayumi for her phone number, but she doesn't have one because she has no friends. After turning up to a Christmas party, Yuta starts to realize that his friends take advantage of him and make fun of him for his mobile addiction. Yuta subsequently starts removing all his contacts out of his SIM card, when Irabu and Mayumi call from the hospital and invite him to a Christmas party at Irabu's office. In this episode, Irabu mostly appears as his "big" form and shortly changes to his "little" form. This is the only episode so far where Irabu doesn't appear in his feminine "middle" form. After the vitamin shot, Yuta turns into a pale blue woodpecker with different colored spots.
7	"Hedgehog"; Transliteration: "Harinezumi" (Japanese: ハリネズミ)	November 26, 2009
Seiji Ino is a Yakuza (more specifically: Designated Crime Syndicate - Koi Group Underground) who has an obsessive compulsive fear of edges (belonephobia), which includes knives, forks, needles, some fish, and even table edges. Seiji is known in the criminal world as "the wise seiji"; he shows this by saving a fellow member (his brother) from a rival group through challenging Yoshiyasu's (rival group leader) to Russian Roulette. He almost loses his mind when Irabu gets Mayumi to give him a vitamin shot. His Wife who runs a bar with Seiji puts a deposit on another bar that's owned by Yoshiyasu's syndicate, this causes more friction between the two factions. Irabu suggests that Seiji try sunglasses, as his fear is mainly getting sharp objects in the eye, he tries on some Sunglasses, but eventually purchases Ski Goggles. Seiji and his brother then negotiate the protection arrangements with Kohei from the first episode, with Irabu in tow. Seiji satisfyingly pokes his ski goggles with a pen, until he notices the table's edges. He then has a panic attack and saws off each edge of the table, then has another attack from the saw he used to neutralize the table. At home, Seiji's wife tells him that she's put down the deposit on the bar, in a panic and then logical moment, he decides to meet up with Yoshiyasu at the Restorante Pero's to retrieve the Deposit. Before meeting with his rival, he stops by Irabu General Hospital where Irabu is taking a photo of his Christmas pudding to send to Yuta. Seiji asks Irabu desperately for some medication, but instead Irabu ends up coming to Pero's with Seiji, being introduced as Irabu the Quack from Hiroshima. There, Irabu observes Yoshiyasu's own Obsessive Compulsion, that he uses his knife as a security blanket. Irabu then takes the knife away and holds onto it, allowing for Seiji to open up to Yoshiyasu and retrieve the Deposit. Christmas eve, Seiji shows signs of starting to overcome his Compulsive fear of sharp edges. Seiji appears as a small dog after the vitamin injection.
8	"I couldn't sit" Transliteration: "Itemo Tattemo" (Japanese: いてもたっても)	December 3, 2009
Yoshio Iwamura is a newspaper-magazine journalist, who has a classic case of check obsessive compulsive disorder, commonly fearing he forgot to put out a cigarette or a kettle, or turn the water off. He ends up rushing back to his house to make sure he hasn't flooded or burned down his building. As a treatment, Irabu takes him to a rival hospital (they stole one of his patients, and are corrupt), where Irabu encourages Yoshio to throw rocks at the hospital. Irabu points out the Hospital Director's car and suggests they loosen the tire bolts. After Irabu throws a rock, and after hesitating, Yoshio throws a rock only to break a window, they both then flee. Because of his disorder, Yoshio is moved to another magazine, this time a teen mag, popular with Girls. He is sent to investigate into a man called the "Homeless Poet" who turns out to be a fraud, and uses the article on him to lure girls. Upon finding out Yoshio gets infuriated and tracks him down, the final chase takes Yoshio running with the Homeless Poet's bag, and trying to get the hospital director to stop after worrying that Irabu has loosened the tires. He jumps in front of the car, where the homeless poet tackles him, spreading papers onto the cars windscreen, the director then crashes the car, and medical waste pours out, and upon looking at the papers that came out of the homeless poet's bag, finds out he's using his dead family records to help Illegal immigrants into Japan. Yoshio then does an article on the two Thugs and immediately becomes a famous reporter again. Irabu thanks Yoshio for exposing the corruptness of the rival hospital, and offers to let him meet Bando, Irabu tells Yoshio that his disorder did good, made him famous, and that he'd be ok if someone was home. On his way home, Yoshio finds an add for a share house. After the injection, Yoshio is represented as a raccoon.
9	"Gifted child actor" Transliteration: "Tensai Koyaku" (Japanese: 天才子役)	December 10, 2009
Hiromi Yasukawa is an actor (ex-child actor) who suffers from narcissistic personality disorder. He now only gets roles as extras, but gets kicked out of a role as a student in a drama for smiling constantly during a tense scene. In the past, he was a popular child actor who had his own television show. His agent (whom Irabu is hitting on) offers him an audition to a movie that he refuses, because there's a sex scene. He's then a guest on a Japanese live TV show, where they make fun of him for his role in the School Drama where he's smiling during a serious scene, and that his role had the name "Student-A". Hiromi gets very upset and not knowing what else to do, starts smiling, this brings an awkward silence to the audience. Afterwards, Hiromi's agent tells him that he's going to lose his contract, and her because of his behavior. Hiromi starts to smile, and has a breakdown. Back at his apartment, Hiromi is under his covers crying. Irabu tries to cheer him up, giving him a list of other things he could do instead of acting. After Hiromi refuses, Irabu gives him the sheet for the audition for the movie. Three days later, Hiromi turns up for the Audition wearing causal clothes rather than his usual child actor attire, surprising his agent. The calendar then flashes back to the day after Irabu gives him the audition sheet. Hiromi appears at Irabu's office and the two discuss the movie role. After Irabu gives him another shot, he notices that he doesn't smile when in pain, he rushes off home where he attaches pegs to his nipples. He turns up to the audition with the pain treatment, where he meets Irabu, who plans on auditioning for the part himself. During his audition, Hiromi has a moment of panic when he's reminded about his role on the school drama as Student-A. He rips his shirt off to remove the pegs that are causing him much pain. This turns out good for him, as he realizes he can make fun of himself, and not need to worry about his image. Irabu and Hiromi both don't get the part, although Hiromi is now a successful variety show host, where he uses some of his old Hiro-chan act.
10	"Owner"; Transliteration: "Ōnā" (Japanese: オーナー)	December 17, 2009
Mitsuo Tanabe is a successful businessman who owns the Great Japan Newspaper Company, and the Mighty Japan Great Powers Baseball team (the opponent of Tokyo Yakult Swallows in the fourth episode) who suffers from a panic disorder where he gets flashbacks. When he turns up to Irabu's office after the events of the last episode, he is given an injection. Both Irabu and Mayumi are shocked that he hasn't turned into an animal. The calendar goes back to December 17, where Bando has his first problems with his Yips, after the game Mitsuo is confronted by media that ask him questions on an apparent scandal that he has influence over the leader of a political party, and that he's made him postpone tax changes. The flashes from the journalist cameras start to disturb him, and he has flashbacks to the post war Tokyo, and moments afterwards including the construction of the Tokyo Tower, and the first Bullet Train service, as well as moments in the 1960s and 70s, he then faints. His doctor (Dr. Ikeyama from another episode) refers him over to Dr. Irabu. In Irabu's office after giving him an injection, Mayumi notices that a faltering fluorescent light is starting to upset Mitsuo, and she turns it off before he has an attack. Irabu then takes this chance to diagnose him with panic disorder and orders Mayumi to turn off all the lights. Mitsuo starts to have an attack, when a scared Irabu suddenly pounces him and Mayumi turns the lights back on. Irabu comments how he's afraid of the dark and still has a night light. Mitsuo then explains how he has visions of the past, suggesting he has PTSD, and that his Panic Disorder is brought on through his stressful role of Power. Irabu tells Mitsuo that he can wear sunglasses to soften the flashes, but that the best medicine is to retire. Mitsuo strongly disagrees, stating that he still has things to do. Later on, Irabu and Mitsuo go shopping, and he explains to Irabu that Japan is still an immature country as it depends on the US, and that he wants to change that. In the sunglasses shop, Seiji from a past episode has a panic attack while also purchasing glasses. A couple of days later, there is another baseball game, where Bando throws and injures another player; after the game the media confront Mitsuo, and he is outraged that they call Bando a "terrorist". Again the media start to harass him, and he has another attack. In Mitsuo's office, after suffering an attack with the setting sun, and reading the newspapers reporting on Mitsuo's outburst, Irabu warns him that this continued problem can lead to depression. Mitsuo's aid tells him that he needs to leave for an appointment, Irabu carries him out to his limo where the media hound him again, and again he has a delusion that a dark mass is enveloping his limo. Irabu then offers to drive him in his Porsche Boxster Convertible. Irabu and Mitsuo speed off, outrunning the tabloids on their motorcycles, escaping them. Irabu drives past Shinbashi Station, where Mitsuo has a flashback to World War II when he was a young Soldier of the recovery operation of Tokyo at the end of the war, as well as watching baseball on an old television set in the 1950s. Then while driving past the Tokyo Tower, he flashes back to being a journalist, having a discussion with the workers on a lunch break. Then a N700 Series Shinkansen goes by above them, much to Irabu's inner train-spotter's joy. Then Mitsuo flashing back to watching the first Shinkansen service with his son. Irabu and Mitsuo stop to watch a baseball game, where he has a flashback to meeting his wife at a baseball game in the past. During this moment of peace, he realizes that he's been living in the past and that things have changed greatly already. His flashbacks start to diminish, and he starts to appear in his modern form, instead of him in the past. He has gray hair and glasses. Just as Mitsuo tries to catch the ball Bando has hit after curing his Yips, Irabu abruptly intercepts, and catches it himself. The next day, Mitsuo calls a press conference where he announces his retirement. On his way home, a couple of journalists, including Yoshio Iwamura (who has appeared several times throughout this episode) ask him for advice to become good journalists. Mitsuo accepts and invites the journalists in for a drink.
11	"Canary"; Transliteration: "Kanaria" (Japanese: カナリア)	December 24, 2009
