= Cardioneuroablation =

- Specialty: Cardiology

A frequent type of syncope, termed vasovagal syncope is originated by intense cardioinhibition, mediated by a sudden vagal reflex, that causes transitory cardiac arrest by asystole and/or transient total atrioventricular block. It is known as “Vaso-vagal Syncope”, “Neurocardiogenic Syncope” or “Neurally-mediated Reflex Syncope”. Although many different therapies have been tried in this condition, severe and refractory cases have been treated with pacemaker implantation despite great controversies about its benefit.

The “Cardioneuroablation” is a technique created in the nineties and patented in USA, aiming to eliminate the cardiac branch of vagal reflex in order to treat the neurocardiogenic syncope without pacemaker implantation. It is performed without surgery, by using radiofrequency catheter ablation with one-day hospital.

The results up to 100 months follow-up are showing better outcome than clinical measures or pacemaker implantation with changing the tilt-test on to normal and by absence of syncope in more than 90% of patients without medications.
