= Blood-injection-injury type phobia =

Irrational fear to the sight of blood, injury, or injection

- Other names: BII

Blood-injection-injury (BII) type phobia is a type of specific phobia characterized by the display of excessive, irrational fear in response to the sight of blood, injury, or injection, or in anticipation of an injection, injury, or exposure to blood. Blood-like stimuli (paint, ketchup) may also cause a reaction. This is a common phobia with an estimated 3-4% prevalence in the general population, though it has been found to occur more often in younger and less educated groups. Prevalence of fear of needles which does not meet the BII phobia criteria is higher. A proper name for BII has yet to be created.

When exposed to phobic triggers, those with the phobia often experience a two-phase response: an initial increase in heart rate and blood pressure, followed quickly by bradycardia (decreased heart rate) and hypotension (decreased blood pressure). This diminishes cerebral blood supply, and will often result in a fainting response. In an individual with BII phobia, expression of these or similar phobic symptoms in response to blood, injection, or injury typically begins before the age of ten. Many who have the phobia will take steps to actively avoid exposure to triggers. This can lead to health issues in phobic individuals as a result of avoidance of hospitals, doctors' appointments, blood tests, and vaccinations, or of necessary self-injections in those with diabetes and multiple sclerosis (MS). Due to frequent avoidance of phobic triggers, BII phobics' personal and professional lives may be limited. Some may feel that their phobia precludes them from joining a healthcare profession, or from getting pregnant. The phobia is also able to affect the health of those who don't have it; a BII-phobic, for instance, may have difficulty providing aid to someone else in an emergency situation in which blood is present.

Causes of BII phobia have yet to be fully understood. There is a body of evidence which suggests the phobia has genetic underpinnings, though many phobics also cite a traumatic life event as a cause of their fear. The fainting response accompanying the phobia may have originated as an adaptive evolutionary mechanism.

Applied tension (AT), a method in which individuals alternately tense and relax their muscles while being exposed to a phobic trigger, is widely recognized as an effective form of treatment for BII phobia. While AT is generally the default treatment suggestion, methods of applied relaxation (AR) and exposure-only cognitive-behavioral therapy (CBT) have been found to be effective in diminishing phobic response in some instances. Certain other strategies can be employed to temporarily alleviate symptoms associated with phobic response, such as coughing to increase cranial blood flow. The acute symptoms associated with an episode of triggering are often fully resolved within a few minutes of stimuli removal.

BII phobia does bear some similarity to other phobic disorders: specifically, dental phobia (commonly considered a sub-type of BII phobia) and hemophobia. In each of these phobias, a biphasic fainting response is a common reaction to a trigger.

== Signs and symptoms ==
In a majority of specific phobias, affected individuals experience heightened anxiety when exposed to a phobic trigger. While BII-phobics experience a similar reaction initially upon exposure, most ultimately respond to a trigger with a biphasic, or two-phase, fainting response. In the first phase, phobics often experience an anxiety reaction characterized by elevated heart rate and heightened blood pressure, as occurs in most other phobias. This is the result of increased activation of the sympathetic nervous system. However, with BII phobia, a second phase usually follows closely, in which the phobic individual experiences a massive dip in heart rate and blood pressure known as vasovagal response. Stimulation of the vagus nerve, a part of the parasympathetic nervous system, is responsible for promoting the lowered heart rate and decreased blood pressure. These physiological changes limit blood flow to the brain and can promote pre-syncope (lightheadedness, feelings of faintness) and syncope (fainting): categorized in this instance as vasovagal fainting. This second, fainting phase is not common to other phobias.

A fainting response pattern is not seen in all individuals with BII phobia, but is found in a majority. Up to 80% of those with BII phobia report either syncope or pre-syncope as a symptom when exposed to a trigger.

Other symptoms that may evolve when exposed to phobic triggers include extreme chest discomfort, tunnel vision, becoming pale, shock, vertigo, diaphoresis (profuse sweating), nausea, and in very rare cases asystole (cardiac arrest) and death. Increase in stress hormone release (particularly of cortisol and corticotrophin) is typical.

Neurological responses to phobic triggers include activation of the bilateral occipito-parietal cortex and the thalamus. It has also been suggested that exposing a BII-phobic individual to a trigger will lead to decreased activity in the brain's medial prefrontal cortex (MPFC). Diminished MPFC activity has been linked with impaired ability to control emotional responses. This lessened emotional control could contribute to a general lack of control over symptoms of anxiety arising when exposed to a phobic trigger.

=== Complications ===
==== On the health of those with the phobia ====
The health of individuals with BII phobia can be jeopardized by the condition as a result of avoidance of phobic triggers. As modern healthcare relies increasingly on injections, it can be difficult for phobics to receive the care they need, since situations involving injections, vaccinations, drawing of blood, etc. are usually avoided. Avoidant behaviors can be especially detrimental to an individual's well-being if they are diabetic and require insulin injections, or experience another pathology or disease which requires treatment via self-injection, such as MS. There may be inappropriate cessation of injection treatment by individuals with the phobia, potentially causing adverse events or reducing treatment efficacy.

Bodily injuries may also be sustained in the course of a fainting response to a phobic trigger.

===== Comorbidity with other health conditions =====
Substantial rates of comorbidity with BII phobia have been demonstrated for the following:

- other life-long phobias
- marijuana abuse
- clinical depression
- panic disorder
- obsessive-compulsive disorder (OCD)
- agoraphobia (AG)
- social anxiety disorder (SAD)

In individuals with diabetes:

- peripheral vascular disease
- cardiovascular disease

==== On the health of the broader population ====
BII phobia is able to affect the health of a broader population than just the community of individuals with the phobia. Someone with the phobia may, for instance, be unable to respond appropriately and/or offer assistance in an emergency event in which another person was injured or cut.

Avoidance of vaccinations due to BII phobia may also prove detrimental to public health at large, as lowered rates of vaccination in a population tend to increase risk of infectious disease outbreak.

Given BII phobics will very often avoid situations involving exposure to blood or needles, these individuals are likely to avoid donating blood. Public health benefit could result from helping them overcome their phobia, such that donation becomes a viable option.

=== Limitations on personal and professional life ===
BII phobia may influence the personal and professional decisions of those with the condition. BII-phobic females may, for instance, choose not to get pregnant, as they fear the injections, vaccinations, and labor-induced pain associated with maternity.

Those with the phobia may also be unable to pursue a profession in a health-related field, such as nursing, which would require repeated exposure to feared stimuli. Phobic individuals may find their ability to complete medical school severely impaired.

=== Related disorders ===
==== Dental phobia ====
Dental phobia is often considered a sub-type of BII phobia, as dental phobics generally fear the aspects of dentistry that are invasive (those commonly involving blood and injections). Some individuals with dental phobia do, however, have fears which center mainly around choking or gagging during a dental procedure.

As with many individuals with BII phobia, many dental phobics will attempt to avoid their triggers. This can lead to refusal to seek dental care, potentially contributing to tooth decay and overall poor oral health. Individuals with dental phobia exhibit symptoms similar to those with BII phobia when exposed to a phobic trigger, including syncope and pre-syncope.

==== Hemophobia ====
BII phobia is closely related to hemophobia (fear of blood), though the two are not the same condition. While the anxieties of BII-phobics tend to extend beyond the fear of blood to ideas of pain, needle breakage inside the body, or needle contact with bones, hemophobics tend to be specifically concerned with exposure to blood. However, in both phobias, individuals experience similar symptoms when exposed to phobic triggers.

== Causes ==
The cause of BII phobia is not yet well understood. Various studies indicate an underlying genetic cause, wherein certain genes make an individual more vulnerable to developing specific phobias. The contributing genes have not yet been identified.

BII phobia has markedly strong familial aggregation — if present in a family, multiple members are likely to have the phobia. This aggregation is stronger in BII phobia than in any other known phobic disorder: upwards of 60% of those with the phobia have first-degree relatives who are also BII-phobics. It is believed that this evidences the phobia's genetic underpinnings. One study estimated actual heritability of the phobia at 59%.

Additionally, a majority of phobics attribute their fear to environmental factors. For instance, some sort of traumatic event involving blood, injury, or injection that conditioned them to fear those particular stimuli. Others self-report being conditioned by seeing another person react to the stimuli with a consistent pattern of fear.

It has been theorized that exhibiting vasovagal response when exposed to blood was evolutionarily advantageous, and that this phobia is a vestige of an ancestral evolutionary mechanism. Fainting may have acted as a form of tonic immobility, allowing primitive humans to play dead in a situation where blood was being spilled, perhaps helping them to avoid the attention of enemies. It has also been suggested that the drop in blood pressure associated with seeing blood — as with an individual seeing blood from their own wound — occurs in order to minimize blood loss.

== Treatments ==
Individuals typically seek therapeutic treatment for BII phobia in a bid to alleviate symptoms that arise when exposed to a phobic trigger. Therapists may use a combination of physical and psychological measures, such as cognitive-behavioral-therapy and applied tension (AT), in order to aid in extinguishing the individual's fear response.

Early studies of methods to combat vasovagal fainting found that certain leg exercises and that individuals making themselves angry over imagined scenarios could increase blood pressure, thus elevating cerebral blood flow and preventing fainting upon exposure to a phobic trigger. A later study tested applied muscle tension as a way of preventing fainting when an individual with a fear of injuries was exposed to triggering visual stimuli. Lars-Göran Öst expanded upon this research, having BII-phobic individuals engage in applied muscle tension while shown blood stimuli. Those who were trained in the technique showed notable symptom improvement over the course of five one-hour treatment sessions.

An AT treatment program most often involves an individual being instructed to clench their arm, leg, and chest muscles in 10 to 15 second intervals as they are systematically exposed to triggers of increasing likeness to real blood or needles. This program is designed to increase heart rate and blood pressure, counteracting vasovagal response.

The method of applied tension remains popular — it is the most common BII phobia treatment suggestion, and has been found to be highly effective in a majority of BII-phobics. However, exposure-only cognitive-behavioral therapy (CBT) can also be effective, as can the method of applied relaxation (AR).

CBT is a technique which promotes fear extinguishment by way of gradual, repeated exposure to feared stimuli. BII-phobics may be given pictures of needles or blood, asked to illustrate needles or scenes with blood, or to speak about their phobic triggers. This systematically progresses to the point of the individual directly confronting a phobic stimulus: being given a needle, witnessing blood being drawn, etc. As exposure continues, it is expected that the phobic response will become less pronounced, and symptoms less debilitating.

While AT targets the phobia's physiological response, aiming to raise blood pressure and directly prevent fainting, AR focuses mainly on helping an individual avoid the phobia's associated anxiety. A phobic will learn progressive relaxation techniques to help to calm themselves upon exposure to a trigger.

=== Temporary alleviation of symptoms ===
Drinking water before a triggering experience such as blood donation has been indicated to aid in prevention of a fainting response. Water will increase sympathetic nervous system activation, raising blood pressure and combating vasovagal response.

Certain physical maneuvers also have the capacity to temporarily boost blood pressure, alleviating symptoms of pre-syncope like lightheadedness by boosting blood flow to the brain. These include the phobic individual crossing their legs, making tight fists with both hands, or engaging muscles of the trunk or arms. Coughing, which can similarly increase cranial blood flow, can also be useful as a coping mechanism to avoid pre-syncope and syncope.

Symptoms of a phobic response are generally able to be fully alleviated within a few minutes simply by removing the phobic trigger.

== Epidemiology ==
BII phobia is one of the more common types of phobia — it is estimated to affect about 3-4% of the general population.

Onset of the phobia generally occurs in middle childhood, before the age of ten. There are more reports of incidence of the phobia in younger individuals and those with low education levels. Some studies suggest that women also experience the phobia more frequently, however results are mixed concerning relative prevalences of the phobia between the sexes.
