= Psychosocial treatment of needle phobia in children =

- Specialty: Psychology

While needle phobia is not age-specific, it is more common in children than in adults. The latest research from all fields indicates that needle-fear is predominant among children fears with some research claiming that up to 93% of children experience [needle-related] stress." Many studies have been performed investigating psychosocial methods of helping children cope with their fear. Recent research has investigated several types of non-invasive treatments to aid children in their needle phobia. These can be categorized into distraction techniques and other methods. These techniques offer safer, cheaper alternatives to drug or anesthetic treatments (see Treatment).

== Distraction treatments ==
Distraction treatments take advantage of the brain's inability to pay full attention to two things at once. Distraction works by passively or actively redirecting the child's attention away from the needle in the medical procedure at hand, leaving "less attention available to perceive pain." Taking the child's attention from the needle also lessens his or her ability to feel anxiety; this is important because a large part of needle phobia is the anticipatory stress caused by the needle. This phenomenon is referred to as an "analgesic effect," meaning "pain-relieving effect." Distraction treatments can be divided into passive and active distraction.

=== Passive distraction ===
Passive distraction is defined for the following studies as a form of distraction that commands the child's attention but does not require any participation on the child's part. The following studies used television to display movies or cartoons as a form of passive distraction. Several studies have investigated the analgesic effect that these can provide during venipuncture.

=== Active distraction ===
Active distraction is defined as a form of distraction that requires the patient's participation. Most of the studies investigating active distraction and its effect on children's fear of needles had the children play with a toy. Several also used nurses and the child's caregiver(s) to actively distract the child.

=== Studies investigating distraction treatments ===
Paediatric Nursing Magazine reviewed several studies that investigated distraction techniques for children during venipuncture. In one study, Cohen concluded in a study that watching a children's movie decreased the child's stress, more so than having the child play with an interactive toy.

Bellieni et al performed a comprehensive study on active and passive distraction at the University of Siena, Italy. They studied 69 children aged 7–12 who were scheduled to undergo venipuncture. To be included in the study, children had to fit all of the following criteria:

- be between 7 and 12 years old
- have eaten their last meal three hours or more prior to venipuncture
- have no neurodevelopmental delay, including verbal difficulty
- have had venipuncture less than once per year

Children were randomly assigned to one of three experimental groups: the control group, where venipuncture was performed without distraction (Group C); the active distraction experimental group, where venipuncture was performed while the mother distracted the child (Group M); and the passive distraction experimental group, where venipuncture was performed while the child watched a TV cartoon (Group TV). There were 23 children in each group; the average age and gender ratios of each group are shown in Table 1. The mothers in Group M were instructed to "actively distract their children during the venipuncture by speaking, caressing, and soothing them." The children in Group TV were placed in a room in front of a television; the cartoon started at least two minutes before the venipuncture took place, and the only distraction offered was an invitation for the child to watch the cartoon when it started playing.

Mean age and gender ratio in treatment groups
| | Group C | Group M | Group TV |
| Number of children | 23 | 23 | 23 |
| Median age (range) | 8 (7-12) | 9 (7-12) | 9 (7-12) |
| Male/female ratio | 10/13 | 12/11 | 11/12 |

This study used the Oucher scale to assess pain in the children. The Oucher scale, a "validated visual pain scale scoring from 0 (no pain) to 100 (maximum pain)," has two separate scales to help children identify their pain level. The scale from 0 to 100 is placed alongside six photographs of children in various levels of discomfort; children in the report were asked to use the pictures as an aid for choosing a numerical value to represent their pain level. Parents of the children were also asked to assess their child's pain levels on the same scale, basing their assessment on the child's external indication of pain and not the child's reported score.

Average Oucher Scale ratings by group
| | Mean | Standard deviation |
| Group C | 23.04 | 24.57 |
| Group M | 17.39 | 21.36 |
| Group TV | 8.91 | 8.65 |

The results of Bellieni's study suggest that passive distraction is more effective than active distraction in lessening perceived pain from venipuncture, although active distraction does have some effect in lessening perceived pain. The average scores on the Oucher scale for Group C, Group M, and Group TV were 23.04, 17.39, and 8.91, respectively; with standard deviation 24.57, 21.36, and 8.65, also respectively. Even taking these fluctuations in data into account, it is apparent that the passive distraction technique significantly lowered the perceived pain when compared to the control group and the active distraction group, according to both parents and children.

These results show that distraction by television had a greater analgesic effect than active distraction performed by the mothers. This is shown by both the children's self-reported scores and the mothers' scores. Mason et al, who published a study in The Journal of Clinical Psychology in Medical Settings, suggested that while both mothers and television are effective distraction techniques, the mothers may have been less effective because the children's fear and distress could have affected their ability to interact with their mothers.

=== Influence of caregivers ===
In the Journal of Holistic Nursing, Cavendar et al performed a study investigating the effect of parents as active distraction to the child. Children in the experimental group received standard care, but the parents were given instruction in how to distract the child. Also, they were given a choice between three distraction items. The control group received standard care, and mothers were present in the room but were not coached on distraction techniques nor given distraction items. The researchers concluded that "fear was rated as significantly lower" in the experimental group, though there was "no statistical difference between the two groups with regard to pain and distress."

The way parents act and react in situations where their child is undergoing venipuncture can have an effect on children and their fear of needles. In The Journal of Family Practice, James G. Hamilton hypothesized that "needle phobia is learned as well as inherited." He observed that "negative experiences associated with immunization, laboratory work, dental visits, and other medical procedures can condition children … toward becoming fearful of needles." Other factors, such as physical and verbal restraint during children's medical procedures, can influence children to fear needles and associated medical situations.

An article published in Nursing Forum by Ives et al outlined several helpful and unhelpful caregiver behaviors during venipuncture. Unhelpful behaviors included overly reassuring children, overly empathizing with children, apologizing, and criticizing children. It was also noted that giving the child control of the procedure from the beginning or asking the child to "indicate readiness to receive the needle" increased distress in the children. Other unhelpful responses included "inadequate or overly forceful restraint by the parent; shaming, threatening, yelling, slapping, lying; or, alternately, pitying, placating, bribing, and helpless parent behaviors." The researchers identified a need to provide instruction to parents on what not to say to their child.

Nurses identified lack of explanation to the child as a major problem in many immunization procedures. One nurse reported "getting kicked and hit by a struggling child" whose parents had not explained the purpose of the visit to the child. Despite the fear that the prospect of venipuncture may invoke, nurses agree that it is better to tell the child exactly what is going to happen beforehand. Nurses also reported that children's fear seemed to correlate with parents' anxiety, and cited parental anxiety as an obstacle in performing venipuncture.

Klieber found several helpful parent behaviors as a part of active distraction in his study published in the Journal of Pain and Symptom Management. These included using a calm voice, giving children permission to cry, remaining firm but not threatening, and using stickers to celebrate effort. The Nursing Forum article also found active and passive distraction by way of toys and television cartoons to be helpful. The researchers agreed that effective coaching and successful clinical visits involving venipuncture could provide children with an opportunity to practice and master "adaptive coping skills."

== Other techniques ==
Kettwich et al of the Department of International Medicine of the University of New Mexico conducted an experiment published in the Journal of Family Practice comparing decorated and plain syringes (see picture). The research hypothesis was that "adding decorative designs or stickers to medical devices before a procedure [would] significantly reduce aversion, fear, and anxiety…[in] needle-phobic patients." The experimental syringes were made with conventional 10-milliliter syringes, decorated so that the "markings of the barrel could still be seen".

In the experiment, "the presentation of individual devices to each subject was randomized to eliminate the possibility of a consistent bias." To determine emotional responses to the medical devices, the researchers used the validated visual analogue scale, where 0 denotes lowest response and 10 shows the strongest response. The Visual Analogue Scale for Aversion, Fear, and Anxiety were used. The study defined "significant needle phobia" as an "aversion, fear, or anxiety score of greater than or equal to 5."

The results of this study showed that the stress-reducing medical devices are effective in reducing aversion, fear, and anxiety towards the medical needles. The results are shown in the table, in the form (Visual Analogue Score) ± (standard deviation).

Reductions in aversion, fear, and anxiety with stress-reducing syringes
| | Conventional syringes | Stress-reducing syringes | P value | % decrease in score |
| Aversion | 5.88 ± (3.61) | 1.21 ± (1.64) | P<.001 | 79% |
| Fear | 4.68 ± (2.8) | 2.19 ± (2.8) | P<.001 | 53% |
| Anxiety | 4.54 ± (3.68) | 2.21 ± (2.84) | P<.001 | 51% |

For all three visual analogue tests, the mean score was much lower for the stress-reducing syringes; on average, the scores for the aversion, fear, and anxiety tests were 79%, 53%, and 51% lower, respectively.

== Future research ==
Gemma Murphy, a staff nurse at the neonatal unit of University College London Hospital, suggested that future research should investigate types of passive distraction other than cartoons and movies. She suggested studies comparing the effect of books, guided imagery, music, and virtual reality video glasses as other forms of passive distraction.
