= Aichmophobia =

Fear of sharp things

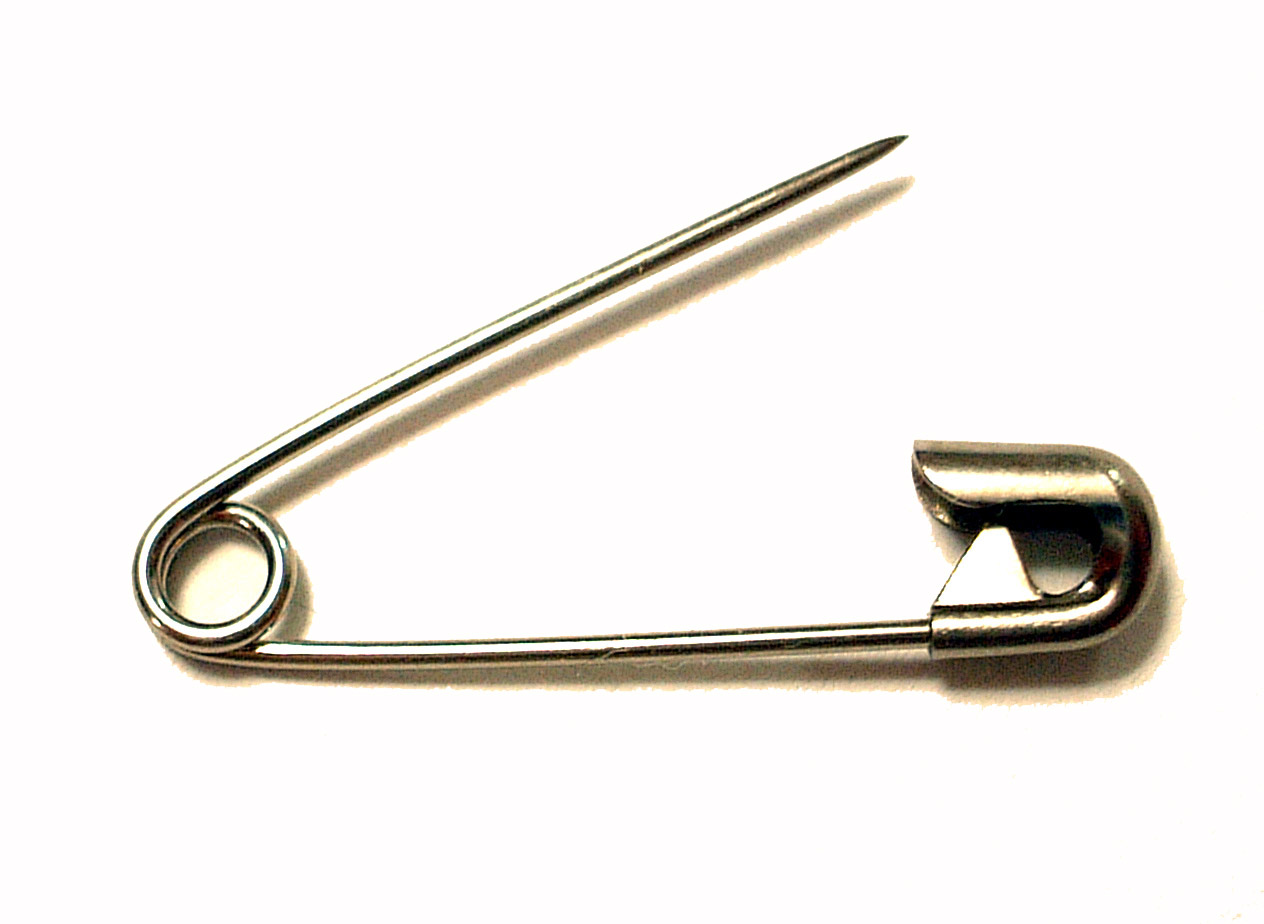
A safety pin

Aichmophobia (/ˌeɪkməˈfoʊbiə/) is a type of specific phobia, the morbid fear of sharp things. It is derived from the Greek aichmē (point) and phobos (fear). This fear may also be referred to as belonephobia or enetophobia.

Sometimes this general term is used to refer to what is more specifically called fear of needles, or needle phobia, or trypanophobia. Fear of needles is the extreme and irrational fear of medical procedures involving injections or hypodermic needles.

Not to be confused with similar condition (avoidance behavior) the visual looming syndrome, where the patient does not fear sharp items, but feels pain or discomfort at gazing upon sharp objects nearby.

== See also ==
- Psychosocial treatment of needle phobia in children
- Visual looming syndrome
