= Gynophobia =

Morbid fear of women

Gynophobia or gynephobia (/ˌɡaɪnəˈfoʊbiə/) is a morbid and irrational fear of women, a type of specific social phobia. It is found in ancient mythology as well as modern cases. A small number of researchers and authors have attempted to pin down possible causes of gynophobia.

Gynophobia should not generally be confused with misogyny, the hatred, contempt for and prejudice against women, although some may use the terms interchangeably, in reference to the social, rather than pathological aspect of negative attitudes towards women. The antonym of misogyny is philogyny, the love, respect for and admiration of women.

Gynophobia is analogous with androphobia, the extreme and/or irrational fear of men. A subset of it is caligynephobia, or the fear of beautiful women.

== Etymology ==
The term gynophobia comes from the Greek γυνή – gunē, meaning "woman" and φόβος – phobos, "fear". The Oxford English Dictionary cites the term's earliest known use as an 1886 writing by physician Oliver Wendell Holmes, Sr.

Hyponyms of the term "gynophobia" include feminophobia. Rare or archaic terms include the Latin horror feminae.

== Medical classification ==
The ICD-11 lists Gynaephobia as an inclusiva for the Social anxiety disorder.

== Examples ==
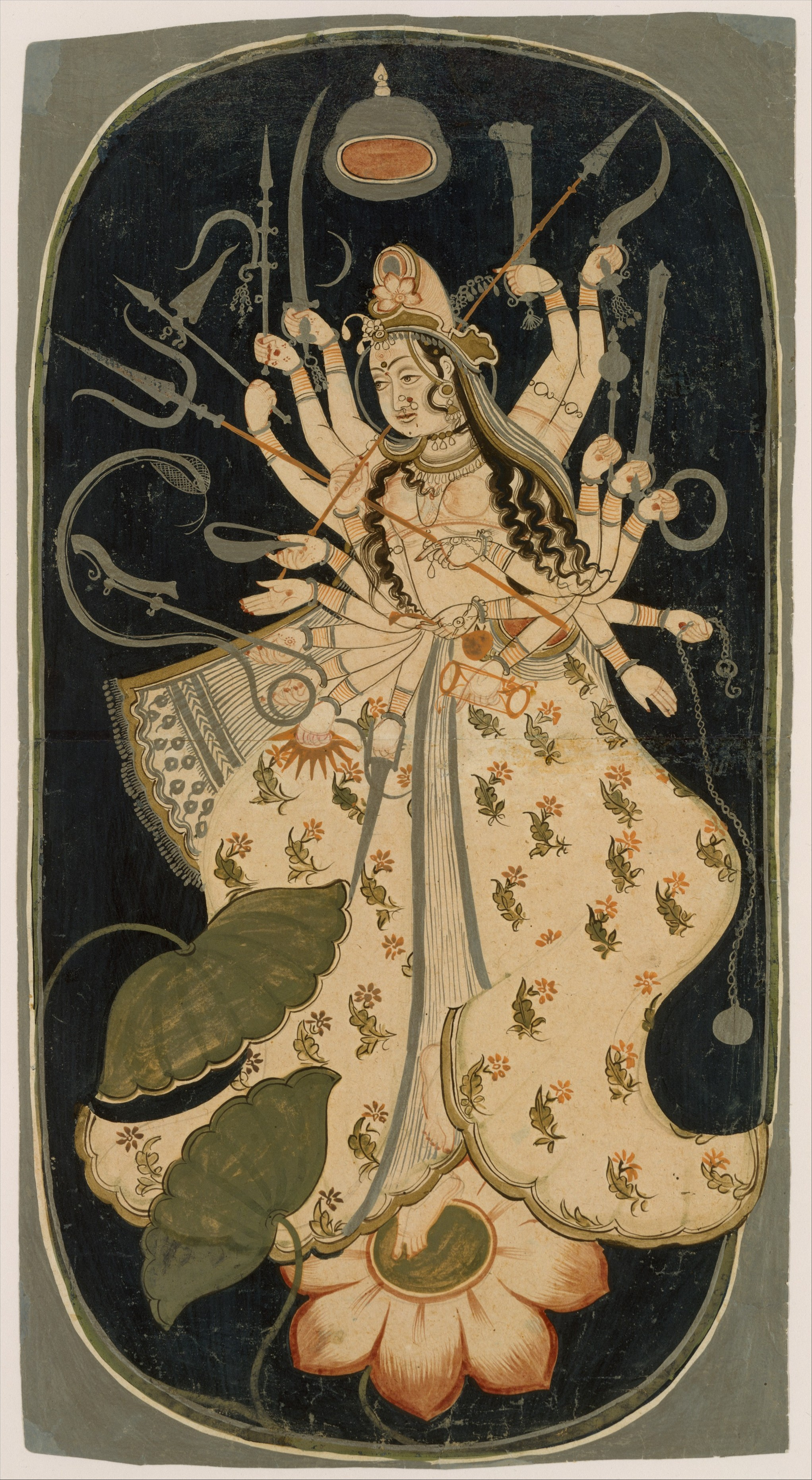
Hindu deity Mahadevi, a figure of a progenitorial "Great Goddess" c. 1725

In his book Sadism and Masochism: The Psychology of Hatred and Cruelty, Wilhelm Stekel discusses horror feminae of a male masochist.

Callitxe Nzamwita, an elderly Rwandan man who reported a fear of women that had persisted for more than half a century of his life, was interviewed by Afrimax in 2023. He barricaded his house to avoid interactions with women, largely remaining inside for 55 years. He was consequently cited as a possible case of gynophobia by several international media outlets, though he was never formally diagnosed.

=== Mythology ===
In ancient mythology, the idea of woman as a, "mysterious, magical body-vessel", or "intimidating Great Goddess" is common. In these myths, woman (sometimes also depicted as a Great World Tree, pomegranate, poppyhead, or mountain) bears all living things, and empties them out of herself into the living world. In the "vessel" analogy, the inside of the vessel is unknown, and all body orifices are special zones, each regarded as idols by artistic representation. The historical permanence of woman as body-vessel, is sometimes artistically depicted to elicit fear. For example, Albert Dubout depicted the Great Goddess as eliciting fear from a short man simply by displaying her large breasts and noting that her breasts survived World War II.

In India, the goddess "Kali the Terrible" is the mother of the world and a fearsome, gruesome, and bloodthirsty destroyer of human life. She partially expresses her destruction through a wide array of female avatars (or "agents"). Kali's avatars and agents are regarded by believers as responsible for serious maladies such as typhoid fever, whooping cough, epilepsy, delirium, and convulsions. For example, Kali's agent goddess Vasurimala is mythologized as responsible for smallpox and cholera. Believers in the rural Indian town of Cranganore, make symbolic monetary offerings to Kali, to fulfill promises made in fear of being stricken with smallpox or cholera.

Woman as "Great Goddess" was often depicted as a goddess of death in ancient Greek mythology as well. For example, in ancient Greek mythology, at least 7 female goddesses are depicted as both nursing mothers and as queens of the dead.

== Psychology ==
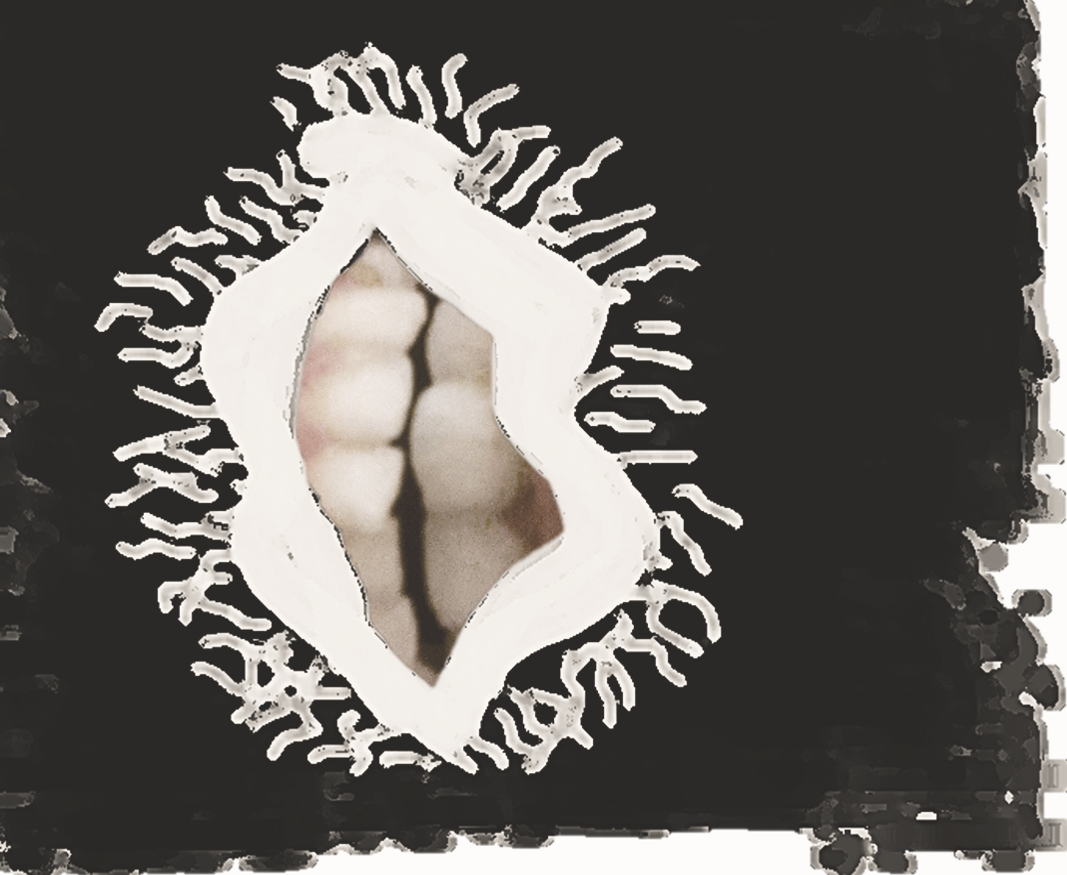
The vagina dentata as a conflation of the vagina and the human mouth

=== Genitalia ===
Sigmund Freud, the founder of psychoanalysis, argued that male hostility towards women stemmed from a subconscious misconception of one's mother as castrated, which is then transposed onto the male individual as an irrational fear for one's own genitals. Joseph Campbell explored this in the context of a recurring image of a vagina dentata (the "toothed vagina") that envelops and then destroys the phallus, while Freud himself instead highlighted the Greek myth of Medusa as a manifestation of the fear of female genitalia and sexuality.

Karen Horney, a psychoanalytic critic of Freud's theory of castration anxiety, proposed in The Dread of Woman (1932) that gynophobia may instead be partially due to a boy's fear that his genital is inadequate in relation to the mother. She also remarked that she was surprised at the lack of explicit recognition of gynophobia, after she allegedly found ample historical, clinical, mythological, and anthropological evidence of gynophobia.

=== Basic resource access barriers and population expansion limitations ===
Extreme examples of universal, cultural gynophobia have been found in the highlands of New Guinea, where widespread anti-masturbation propaganda coincides with notions of, "perilous female sexuality". The anthropologist Carol Ember argues that such fears were likely caused by limited availability of basic resources that would be required to increase the population.

== See also ==
- List of phobias
