= Fear of needles =

Phobia of injections or needles

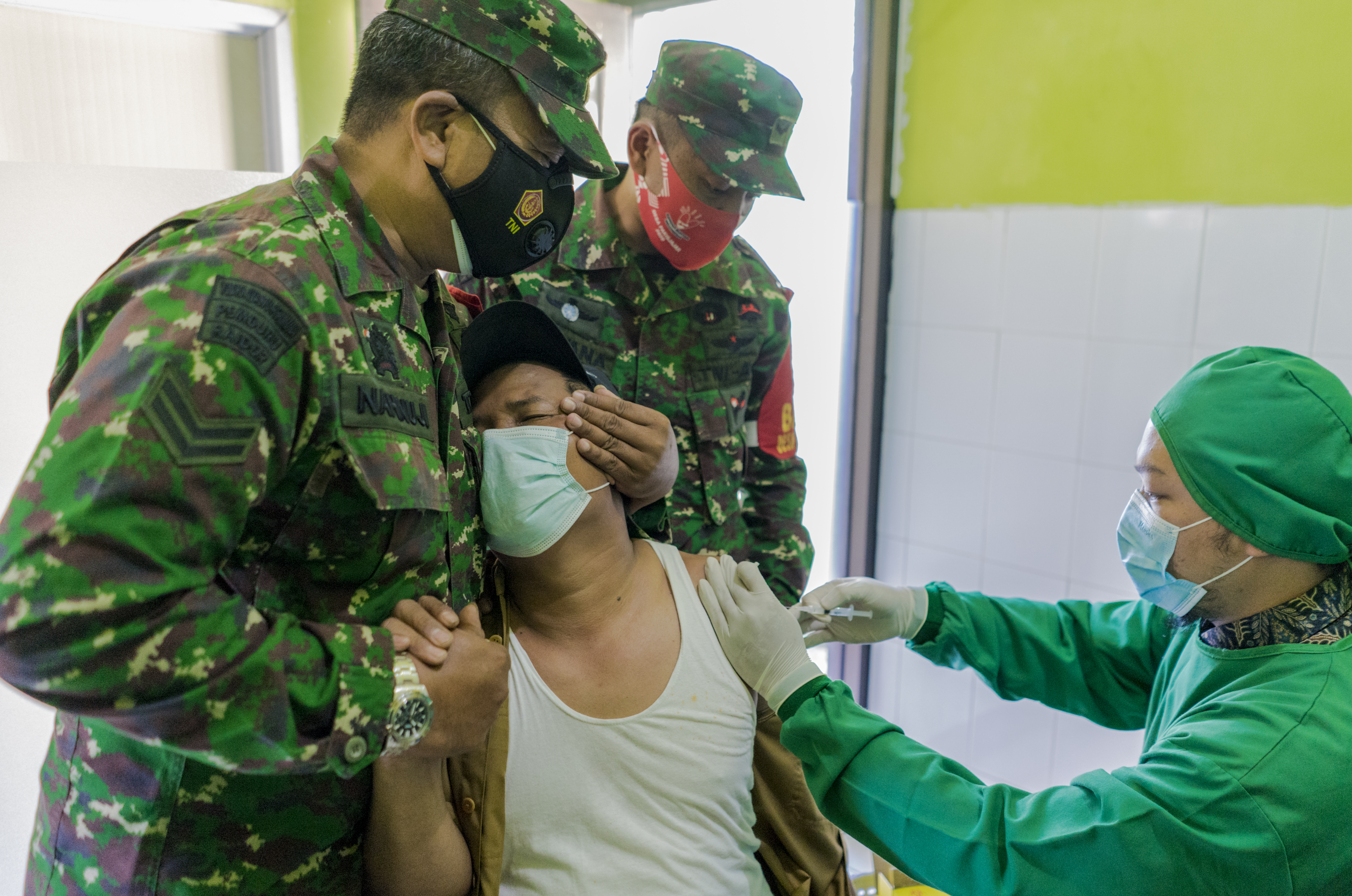
- A man with a fear of needles being comforted by soldiers so that he can receive an injection
- Treatment: Exposure-based therapies and alternate forms of clinical inoculation
- Frequency: About 22% of adult population, 3.5–10% of general population may temporarily lose consciousness around the time of a needle procedure

Fear of needles, known in medical literature as needle phobia, is the extreme fear of medical procedures involving injections or hypodermic needles. It is occasionally referred to as aichmophobia, although this term may also refer to a more general fear of sharply pointed objects.

== Overview and incidence ==
The condition was officially recognized in 1994 in the DSM-IV (Diagnostic and Statistical Manual of Mental Disorders, 4th edition) as a specific phobia of blood-injection-injury type phobia (BII phobia). Phobic level responses to injections lead to avoidance of inoculations, blood tests, and in the more severe cases, all medical care.

It is estimated that at least 10% of American adults experience some level of fear of needles, and it is likely that the actual number is larger, as the most severe cases are never documented due to the tendency of those affected to avoid all medical treatment. Surveys in other countries report similar or higher figures. A 2019 meta-analysis of studies from ten countries found needle fear in 20 to 50% of adolescents and 20 to 30% of young adults, with prevalence declining by about 8.7% per decade of age. In a 2012 Canadian survey, 63% of children and 24% of parents reported a fear of needles, and in an Australian general practice sample, 22% of adults did, with those affected far more likely to avoid treatment involving needles.

The diagnosis criteria for BII phobias are stricter, with an estimated 3-4% prevalence in the general population, and this also includes blood-related phobias. A Norwegian study following children from age 4 to 14 found prevalence rose from 3% at age 4 to a peak of about 8% at age 10, with just under 20% meeting criteria at least once.

Prevalence of fear of needles has been increasing, with two studies showing an increase among children from 25% in 1995 to 65% in 2012 (for those born after 1999). Augusta University professor Amy Baxter attributes this increase to an increase in administration of booster shots around the age of 5, which is old enough to remember and young enough to be more likely to result in formation of a phobia. Needle fear also affects uptake of health care. In a 2021 survey of 15,014 UK adults, 26.2% screened positive for blood-injection-injury phobia, and the authors estimated that these fears may account for about 10% of COVID-19 vaccine hesitancy.

== Evolutionary basis ==
According to Dr. James G. Hamilton, author of the pioneering paper on needle phobia, it is likely that the form of needle phobia that is genetic has some basis in evolution, given that thousands of years ago humans who meticulously avoided stab wounds and other incidences of pierced flesh would have a greater chance of survival.

The discussion of the evolutionary basis of needle phobia in Hamilton's review article concerns the vasovagal type of needle phobia, which is a sub-type of blood-injection-injury type phobia. This type of needle phobia is uniquely characterized by a two-phase vasovagal response. First, there is a brief acceleration of heart rate and blood pressure. This is followed by a rapid plunge in both heart rate and blood pressure, sometimes leading to unconsciousness. The loss of consciousness is sometimes accompanied by convulsions and numerous rapid changes in the levels of many different hormones.

Other medical journal articles have discussed additional aspects of this possible link between vasovagal syncope and evolutionary fitness in blood-injection-injury phobias.

An evolutionary psychology theory that explains the association to vasovagal syncope is that some forms of fainting are non-verbal signals that developed in response to increased inter-group aggression during the Paleolithic. A non-combatant who has fainted signals that they are not a threat. This might explain the association between fainting and stimuli such as bloodletting and injuries.

== Types ==
Although needle phobia is defined simply as an extreme fear of medically related shots/injections, it appears in several varieties.

=== Vasovagal ===
Although most specific phobias stem from the individuals themselves, the most common type of needle phobia, affecting 50% of those afflicted, is an inherited vasovagal reflex reaction. Approximately 80% of people with a fear of needles report that a relative within the first degree exhibits the same disorder.

Vasovagal reactions may be triggered by the sight, thought, or feeling of needles or needle-like objects. The physiological changes associated with this type of phobia also include feeling faint, sweating, dizziness, nausea, pallor, tinnitus, panic attacks, and initially high blood pressure and heart rate followed by a plunge in both at the moment of injection. The primary symptom of vasovagal fear is vasovagal syncope, or fainting due to a decrease of blood pressure.

Many people who faint during needle procedures report no conscious fear of the needle procedure itself, but a great fear of the vasovagal syncope reaction. People become more afraid of the side effects of low blood pressure caused by the idea of a needle.

A study in the medical journal Circulation concluded that in many patients with this condition (as well as patients with the broader range of blood/injury phobias), an initial episode of vasovagal syncope during a needle procedure may be the primary cause of needle phobia rather than any basic fear of needles. These findings reverse the more commonly held beliefs about the cause-and-effect pattern of needle phobics with vasovagal syncope.

Although most phobias are dangerous to some degree, needle phobia is one of the few that actually kill. In cases of severe phobia, the drop in blood pressure caused by the vasovagal shock reflex may cause death. In Hamilton's 1995 review article on needle phobia, he was able to document 23 deaths as a direct result of vasovagal shock during a needle procedure.

The best treatment strategy for this type of needle phobia has historically been desensitization or the progressive exposure of the patient to gradually more frightening stimuli, allowing them to become desensitized to the stimulus that triggers the phobic response. In recent years, a technique known as "applied tension" has become increasingly accepted as an often effective means for maintaining blood pressure to avoid the unpleasant, and sometimes dangerous, aspects of the vasovagal reaction. Applied tension is a technique in which the patient tenses the muscles in their arms, legs, and thorax to raise their blood pressure, reducing the chance of losing consciousness.

=== Associative ===
Associative fear of needles is the second most common type, affecting 30% of needle phobics. This type is the classic specific phobia in which a traumatic event such as an extremely painful medical procedure or witnessing a family member or friend undergo such, causes the patient to associate all procedures involving needles with the original negative experience.

This form of fear of needles causes symptoms that are primarily psychological in nature, such as extreme unexplained anxiety, insomnia, preoccupation with the coming procedure, and panic attacks. Effective treatments include cognitive therapy, hypnosis, and/or the administration of anti-anxiety medication.

=== Resistive ===
Resistive fear of needles occurs when the underlying fear involves not simply needles or injections but also being controlled or restrained. It typically stems from repressive upbringing or poor handling of prior needle procedures (for example, forced physical or emotional restraint).

This form of needle phobia affects around 20% of those afflicted. Symptoms include combativeness, high heart rate coupled with extremely high blood pressure, violent resistance, avoidance, and flight. The suggested treatment is psychotherapy, this may include teaching the patient self-injection techniques or finding a trusted health care provider.

=== Hyperalgesic ===
Hyperalgesic fear of needles is another form that does not have as much to do with fear of the actual needle. Patients with this form have an inherited hypersensitivity to pain, or hyperalgesia. To them, the pain of an injection is unbearably great and many cannot understand how anyone can tolerate such procedures.

This form of fear of needles affects approximately 10% of people with needle phobia. The symptoms include extreme explained anxiety, and elevated blood pressure and heart rate at the immediate point of needle penetration or seconds before. The recommended forms of treatment include some form of anesthesia, either topical or general.

== Vicarious ==
Whilst witnessing procedures involving needles it is possible for the phobic to experience the symptoms of a needle phobic attack without actually being injected. Prompted by the sight of the injection the phobic may exhibit the normal symptoms of vasovagal syncope and fainting or collapse is common. While the cause of this is not known, it may be due to the phobic imagining the procedure being performed on themselves. Recent neuroscience research shows that feeling a pin prick sensation and watching someone else's hand get pricked by a pin activate the same part of the brain.

== Comorbidity and triggers ==
Fear of needles, especially in its more severe forms, is often comorbid with other phobias and psychological ailments; for example, iatrophobia, dental phobia or an irrational fear of doctors, is often seen in needle phobic patients.

A needle phobic patient does not need to physically be in a doctor's office to experience panic attacks or anxiety brought on by needle phobia. There are many triggers in the outside world that can bring on an attack through association. Some of these are blood, injuries, the sight of the needle physically or on a screen, paper pins, syringes, examination rooms, white lab coats, dentists, nurses, the antiseptic smell associated with offices and hospitals, the sight of a person who physically resembles the patient's regular health care provider, or even reading about the fear.

== Treatment, mitigation, and alternatives ==
Medical literature suggests a number of treatments that have been proven effective for specific cases of needle phobia, but provides very little guidance to predict which treatment may be effective for any specific case. The following are some of the treatments that have been shown to be effective in some specific cases.

=== Treating the phobia ===
- Behavioral therapy. Effectiveness of this varies greatly depending on the person and the severity of the condition. There is some debate as to the effectiveness of behavioral treatments for specific phobias, though some data are available to support the efficacy of approaches such as exposure therapy. Any therapy that endorses relaxation methods may be contraindicated for the treatment of fear of needles as this approach encourages a drop in blood pressure that only enhances the vasovagal reflex. In response to this, graded exposure approaches can include a coping component relying on applied tension as a way to prevent complications associated with the vasovagal response to specific blood, injury, injection type stimulus. A 2015 systematic review of 11 trials found that exposure-based therapy reduced fear in children aged 7 and over and, in the short term, in adults, and that adding applied tension reduced fainting compared with exposure alone.
- One-session treatment. A modified one-session treatment, followed by four weeks of online homework, was tested in 24 children and adolescents aged 8 to 18 with blood-injection-injury phobia. Three months later, 62.5% no longer met diagnostic criteria.
- Internet-based cognitive behavioral therapy. In a 2024 randomized trial of 33 children and adolescents with dental or injection phobia, a 12-week therapist-guided online program based on exposure therapy, with a parent as coach, left 41% no longer meeting diagnostic criteria, compared with none of those on a waiting list.
- Virtual reality exposure therapy. A 2021 systematic review found the effect of VR on blood-injection-injury phobia unclear. A 2026 Phase II randomized controlled trial in England found that an automated VR therapy, in which adolescents aged 12 to 15 received virtual injections and blood tests from a virtual nurse over about three sessions, reduced self-reported needle fear compared with no treatment. The authors noted that a larger trial is needed to test whether it increases vaccine uptake.

=== Reducing pain and distress during procedures ===
- Ethyl chloride spray (and other freezing agents). Easily administered, but provides only superficial pain control. A 2016 Cochrane review found that vapocoolant sprays modestly reduce pain during intravenous cannulation without affecting first-attempt success, and a 2023 meta-analysis found a benefit in adults but not in children.
- Iontophoresis. Iontophoresis drives anesthetic through the skin by using an electric current. It provides effective anesthesia, but is generally unavailable to consumers on the commercial market and some regard it as inconvenient to use.
- EMLA. EMLA is a topical anesthetic cream that is a eutectic mixture of lidocaine and prilocaine. It is a prescription cream in the United States, and is available without prescription in some other countries. Although not as effective as iontophoresis, since EMLA does not penetrate as deeply as iontophoresis-driven anesthetics, EMLA provides a simpler application than iontophoresis. EMLA penetrates much more deeply than ordinary topical anesthetics, and it works adequately for many individuals.
- Ametop. Ametop gel appears to be more effective than EMLA for eliminating pain during venepuncture.
- Lidocaine/tetracaine patch. A self-heating anesthetic patch containing a eutectic mixture of lidocaine and tetracaine has been available in several countries, and was specifically approved by government agencies for use in needle procedures. The patch was sold under the trade name Synera in the United States and Rapydan in European Union. Each patch was packaged in an air-tight pouch. It began to heat up slightly when the patch was removed from the packaging and exposed to the air. The patch required 20 to 30 minutes to achieve full anesthetic effect. The Synera patch was approved by the United States Food and Drug Administration on 23 June 2005. On 11 November 2022, the manufacturer announced that it would be discontinuing the manufacture and sales of the patch worldwide by the end of 2022.
- Vibration and cold devices. A 2024 meta-analysis of 19 randomized trials in children aged 12 and under found that Buzzy, a device that combines vibration and cold, reduced pain and anxiety during needle procedures, with no significant adverse events.
- Virtual reality immersion. Meta-analyses have found that immersion in VR reduces pain, fear and anxiety in children and adolescents during needle procedures, although many included studies were of low methodological quality. A pair of randomized controlled trials at two Australian tertiary hospitals found that Smileyscope, a VR program designed for needle procedures, reduced pain and anxiety in children aged 4 to 11 years undergoing venipuncture or intravenous cannulation, with no safety concerns. Some immersive VR programs are synchronized with the steps of the procedure, so that events in the virtual scene match what is happening in reality. In a 2023 randomized trial of 149 children aged 4 to 12 years in Hong Kong, a VR program combining procedural information and distraction, reduced pain and anxiety compared with standard care.
- Tensing the abdominal muscles (applied tension) can help avoid fainting.
- Swearing can reduce perceived pain.
- Distraction can reduce perceived pain, for example pretending to cough, performing a visual task, watching a video, listening to music, or playing a video game.

=== Sedation ===
- Nitrous oxide (laughing gas). This will provide sedation and reduce anxiety for the patient, along with some mild analgesic effects. Reviews of its use for short painful procedures in children have found it effective with few serious adverse events, although the quality of evidence is low to moderate.
- Inhalation general anesthesia. This will eliminate all pain and also all memory of any needle procedure. However, it is often regarded as a very extreme solution. It is not covered by insurance in most cases, and most physicians will not order it. It can be risky and expensive and may require a hospital stay.
- Benzodiazepines, such as diazepam (Valium), lorazepam (Ativan), alprazolam (Xanax), or clonazepam (Klonopin), may help alleviate the anxiety of needle phobics, according to Dr. James Hamilton. These medications have an onset of action within 5 to 15 minutes from ingestion. A relatively large oral dose may be necessary.

=== Needle-free alternatives ===
- Jet injectors. Jet injectors work by introducing substances into the body through a jet of high pressure gas as opposed to by a needle. Though these eliminate the needle, some people report that they cause more pain. Also, they are only helpful in a very limited number of situations involving needles; for example, insulin and inoculations.
- Certain drugs and vaccines, such as the live attenuated influenza vaccine, can be administered nasally.

=== Children ===
Guidance from the Royal Australian College of General Practitioners on childhood immunisation recommends that children aged three and older sit upright, which reduces pain and fear, and that the most painful vaccine be given last to reduce distress. Researchers have recommended better access to pain relief during childhood vaccination to prevent needle fears from developing.

== See also ==
- Aichmophobia
- List of phobias
- Psychosocial treatment of needle phobia in children
