= Depression in childhood and adolescence =

Pediatric depressive disorders

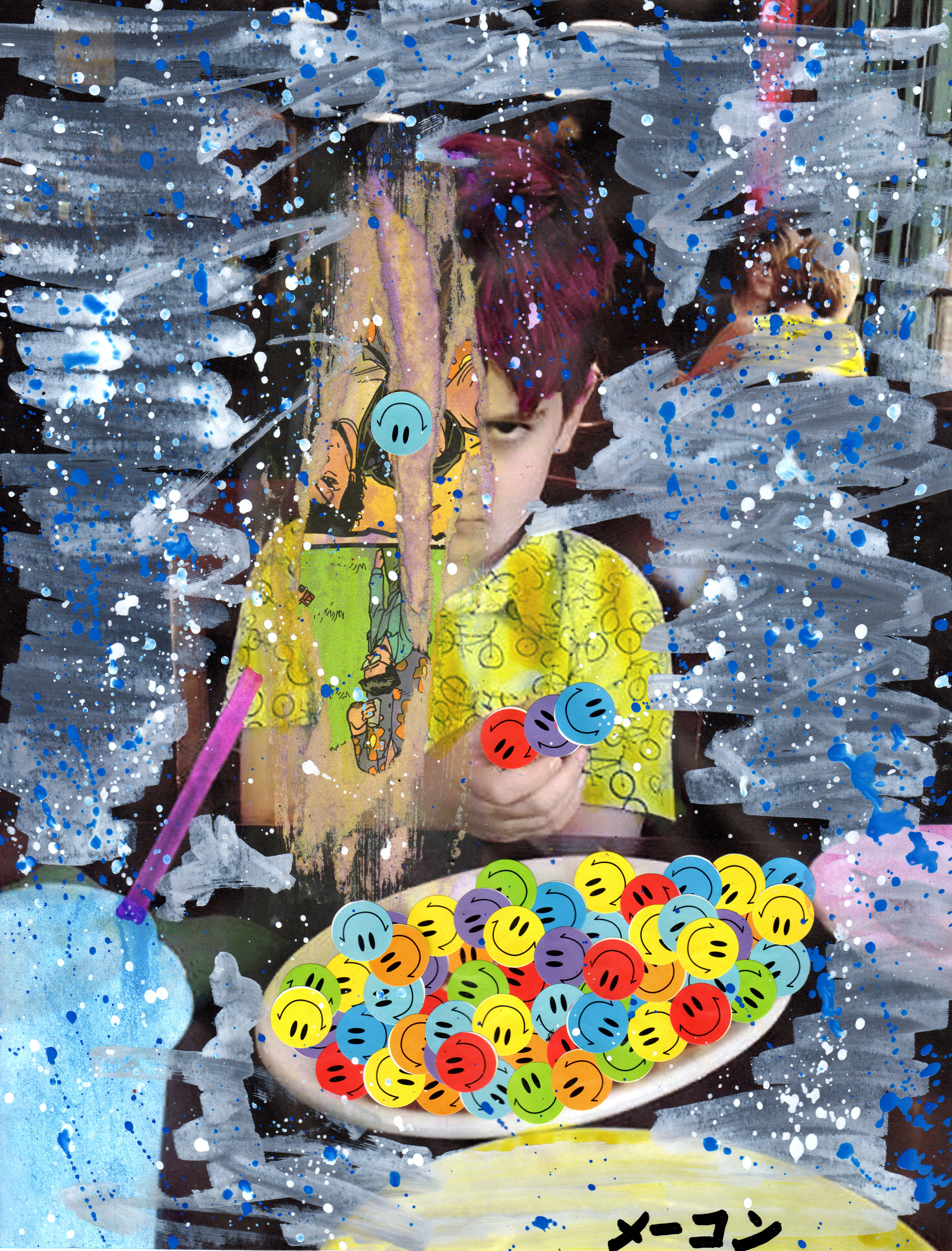
Artwork depicting childhood depression by Marc-Anthony Macon

Major depressive disorder, often simply referred to as depression, is a mental disorder characterized by prolonged unhappiness or irritability. It is accompanied by a constellation of somatic and cognitive signs and symptoms such as fatigue, apathy, sleep problems, loss of appetite, loss of engagement, low self-regard/worthlessness, difficulty concentrating or indecisiveness, or recurrent thoughts of death or suicide.

Depression in childhood and adolescence is similar to adult major depressive disorder, although young sufferers may exhibit increased irritability or behavioral dyscontrol instead of the more common sad, empty, or hopeless feelings that are seen with adults. Children who are under stress, experiencing loss or grief, or have other underlying disorders are at a higher risk for depression. Depression in young people is often comorbid with mental disorders outside of other mood disorders, most commonly anxiety disorders, especially social anxiety disorder, and conduct disorder. Depression also tends to run in families. The National Alliance on Mental Illness reports that 75 percent of mental health disorders commence by age 24. In a 2016 Cochrane review, cognitive behavior therapy (CBT), third-wave CBT, and interpersonal therapy demonstrated small positive benefits in the prevention of depression. Psychologists have developed different treatments to assist children and adolescents suffering from depression, though the legitimacy of the diagnosis of childhood depression as a psychiatric disorder, as well as the efficacy of various methods of assessment and treatment, remains controversial.

== Base rates and prevalence ==
About 8% of children and adolescents have depression. In 2016, 51% of students (teens) who visited a counseling center reported having anxiety, followed by depression (41%), relationship concerns (34%) and suicidal ideation (20.5%). Many students reported experiencing multiple conditions at once. Research suggests that the prevalence of children with major depressive disorder in Western cultures ranges from 1.9% to 3.4% among primary school children. Among teenagers, up to 9% meet criteria for depression at a given moment and approximately 20% experience depression sometime during adolescence. Studies have also found that among children diagnosed with a depressive episode, there is a 70% rate of recurrence within five years. Furthermore, 50% of children with depression will have a recurrence at least once during their adulthood. While there is no gender difference in depression rates up in those under 15 after that age the rate among women doubles compared to men. However, in terms of recurrence rates and symptom severity, there is no gender difference. In an attempt to explain these findings, one theory asserts that preadolescent women on average have more risk factors for depression when compared to men. These risk factors then combine with the typical stresses and challenges of adolescent development to trigger the onset of depression. Depression in youth and adolescence is associated with a wide array of outcomes that can come later in life for the affected individual. Some of these outcomes include poor physical and mental health, trouble functioning socially, and suicide.

=== Suicidal intent ===
Like their adult counterparts, children and adolescents suffering from depression are at an increased risk of attempting or committing suicide. Suicide is the fourth leading cause of death among 15- to 19-year-olds. Adolescent males may be at an even higher risk of suicidal behaviour when also presenting with a conduct disorder. In the 1990s, the National Institute of Mental Health (NIMH) found that up to 7% of adolescents who develop major depressive disorder may commit suicide as young adults. Such statistics demonstrate the importance of interventions by family and friends, the importance of early diagnosis, and treatment by medical staff, in order to prevent suicide amongst youth at-risk. However, some data showed an opposite conclusion. Most depression symptoms are reported more frequently by females; such as sadness (reported by 85.1% of women and 54.3% of men) and crying (approximately 63.4% of women and 42.9% of men). Women have a higher probability to experience depression than men, with the prevalence of 19.2% and 13.5% respectively.

=== Risk factor ===
Risk factors for adolescent depression include a family history of depression, a personal history of trauma, family conflict, minority sexual orientation, or having a chronic medical illness. There tends to be higher prevalence rates and more severe symptoms in adolescent girls when compared to adolescent boys. These higher rates are also applicable in older adolescents when compared to younger adolescents. This may be due to hormonal fluctuations that may make adolescent women more vulnerable to depression. The fact that increased prevalence of depression correlates with hormonal changes in women, particularly during puberty, suggests that female hormones may be a trigger for depression. The gender gap in depression between adolescent men and women has been linked to young women's lower levels of positive thinking, need for approval, and self-focusing in negative conditions. Frequent exposure to victimization or bullying was related to high risks of depression, ideation and suicide attempts compared to those not involved in bullying. Nicotine dependence is also associated with depression, anxiety, and poor dieting, mostly in young men. Although causal direction has not been established, involvement in any sex or drug use is cause for concern. Children who develop major depression are more likely to have a family history of the disorder (often a parent who experienced depression at an early age) than patients with adolescent- or adult-onset depression. Adolescents with depression are also likely to have a family history of depression, though the correlation is not as high as it is for children.

=== Comorbidity ===
Conduct disorder frequently co-occurs with major depressive disorder in children and adolescents. Clinical and epidemiological studies have documented substantial overlap between depressive and externalizing symptoms, and this comorbidity is associated with poorer psychosocial functioning, academic difficulties, substance use risk, and elevated suicidality. Recent systematic reviews further suggest that shared underlying genetic vulnerability may partly explain this co-occurrence across development.

The prevalence of psychiatric comorbidities during adolescence may vary by race and ethnicity.

=== Social causes ===
Adolescents are engaged in a search for identity and meaning in their lives. They have also been regarded as a unique group with a wide range of difficulties and problems in their transition to adulthood. Academic pressure, intrapersonal and interpersonal difficulties, death of loved ones, illnesses, and loss of relationships, have shown to be significant stressors in young people. While it is a normal part of development in adolescence to experience distressing and disabling emotions, there is an increasing incidence of mental illness globally. Depression is usually a response to life events such as relationship issues, financial problems, physical illness, bereavement, etc. Some people can become depressed for no obvious reason and their suffering is just as real as those reacting from life events. Psychological makeup can also play a role in vulnerability to depression. People who have low self-esteem, constantly view themselves and the world with pessimism, or are readily overwhelmed by stress, may be especially prone to depression. Community surveys find that women are more likely than men to say they are under stress. Other studies suggest that women are more likely than men to become depressed in response to a stressful event. Women are also more likely to experience certain kinds of severe stress such as child sexual abuse, adult sexual assaults, and domestic violence. Furthermore, depression can be the result of a bad experience, one of which might occur during athletics where social causes transcend into hierarchy practices in the form of bullying, which can root the initial cause.

== Diagnosis ==
According to the DSM-IV, children must exhibit either a depressed mood or a loss of interest/pleasure in normal activities. These activities may include school, extracurricular activities, or peer interactions. Depressive moods in children can be expressed as being unusually irritable. These expressions may be displayed by "acting out," behaving recklessly, or reacting with anger/hostility. Children who do not have the cognitive or language development to properly express mood states can also exhibit their mood through physical complaints such as showing sad facial expressions (frowning) and poor eye contact. A child must also exhibit four other symptoms in order to be clinically diagnosed. However, according to the Omnigraphics Health References Series: Depression Sourcebook, Third Edition, a more calculated evaluation must be given by a medical or mental health professional such as a physiologist or psychiatrist. Following the bases of symptoms, signs include but are not limited to, an unusual change in sleep habits (for example, trouble sleeping or overly indulged sleeping hours); a significant amount of weight gain/loss by the lack or excessive eating; experiencing aches/pains for no apparent reason that can be found; and an inability to concentrate on tasks or activities. If these symptoms are present for a period of two weeks or longer, it is safe to make the assumption that the child, or anybody else for that matter, is falling into major depression.

=== Assessment ===
It is recommended by the American Academy of Pediatrics that primary care providers screen children and adolescents for depression with validated screening tools, self-rated, or clinician-administered ones, once per year. However, there is no universally recommended screening tool and the clinician is free to choose from various validated ones based on personal preference. Once the screening tool indicates the potential presence of a depression, a thorough diagnostic assessment is recommended. In early 2016, the USPSTF released an updated recommendation for the screening of adolescents ages 12 to 18 years for major depressive disorder (MDD). Appropriate treatment and follow-up should be provided for adolescents who screen positive.

=== Correlation between adolescent depression and adulthood obesity ===
According to research conducted by Laura P. Richardson et al., major depression occurred in 7% of the cohort during early adolescence (11, 13, and 15 years of age) and 27% during late adolescence (18 and 21 years of age). At 26 years of age, 12% of study members were obese. After adjusting for each individual's baseline body mass index (calculated as the weight in kilograms divided by the square of height in meters), depressed late-adolescent girls were at a greater than 2-fold increased risk for obesity in adulthood compared with their non-depressed female peers (relative risk, 2.32; 95% confidence interval, 1.29-3.83). A dose-response relationship between the number of episodes of depression during adolescence and the risk for adult obesity was also observed in female subjects. The association was not observed for late adolescent boys or for early adolescent boys or girls.

=== Correlation between child depression and adolescent cardiac risks ===
According to research by RM Carney et al., any history of child depression influences the occurrence of adolescent cardiac risk factors, even if individuals no longer have depression. They are much more likely to develop heart disease as adults.

=== Distinction from major depressive disorder in adults ===
While there are many similarities to adult depression, especially in expression of symptoms, there are many differences that create a distinction between the two diagnoses. Research has shown that when a child's age is younger at diagnosis, typically there will be a more noticeable difference in the expression of symptoms from the classic signs in adult depression. One major difference between the symptoms exhibited in adults and in children is that children have higher rates of internalization; therefore, symptoms of child depression are more difficult to recognize. One major cause of this difference is that many of the neurobiological effects in the brain of adults with depression are not fully developed until adulthood. Therefore, in a neurological sense children and adolescents express depression differently.

== Treatment ==
Psychotherapy and medications are commonly used treatment options. In some research, adolescents showed a preference for psychotherapy rather than antidepressant medication for treatment. For adolescents, cognitive behavioral therapy and interpersonal therapy have been empirically supported as effective treatment options. For children and adolescents with moderate-to-severe depressive disorder, fluoxetine seems to be best treatment (either with or without cognitive behavioural therapy) but more research is needed to be certain.

Clinicians often divide treatment into three phases: In the acute phase, which usually lasts six to 12 weeks, the goal is to relieve symptoms. In the continuation phase, which can last for several more months, the goal is to maximize improvements. At this stage, clinicians may make adjustments to the dose of a medication. In the maintenance phase, the aim is to prevent relapse. Sometimes the dose of a drug is lowered at this stage, or psychotherapy carries more of the weight. Unique differences in life experience, temperament, and biology make treatment a complex matter; no single treatment is right for everyone.

Pediatric massage therapy may have an immediate effect on a child's emotional state at the time of the massage, but sustained effects on depression have not been identified.

Treatment programs have been developed that help reduce the symptoms of depression. These treatments focus on immediate symptom reduction by concentrating on teaching children skills pertaining to primary and secondary control. While much research is still needed to confirm this treatment program's efficacy, one study showed it to be effective in children with mild or moderate depressive symptoms.

Identification and treatment of concomitant parental depression is associated with improved responses to treatment in adolescents with depression as having a parent with depression may negatively affect a young person's response to therapy as well as their outlook on depression.

=== Talk therapy ===
There are a variety of common types of talk therapy. These can assist people to live more fully, help improve good feelings, and have a better life. Effective psychotherapy for children always includes parent involvement, teaching skills that are practiced at home or at school, and measures of progress that are tracked over time. In many types, men are encouraged to open up more emotionally and communicate their personal distress, while women are encouraged to be assertive of their own strengths. Often psychotherapy teaches coping skills while allowing the teens or children to explore feelings and events in a safe environment.

Severe depression, low global functioning, higher scores on suicidality scales, co-existing anxiety, distorted thought processes and feelings of hopelessness are characteristics of adolescent depression that are associated with a poor response to psychotherapy. If there is concomitant family conflict then interpersonal therapy is more effective than cognitive therapy.

==== Cognitive therapy ====
Cognitive therapy aims to change harmful ways of thinking and reframe negative thoughts in a more positive way. Aims of cognitive therapy include various steps of patient learning. During cognitive behavioral therapy, children and adolescents with depression work with therapists to learn about their diagnosis, how to identify and reshape negative thought patterns, and how to increase engagement in enjoyable activities. CBT-trained therapists work with individuals, families, and groups. The approach can be used to help anyone irrespective of ability, culture, race, gender, or sexual preference. It can be applied with or without concurrent psychopharmacological medication, depending on the severity or nature of each patient's problem. The duration of cognitive-behavioral therapy varies, although it typically is thought of as one of the briefer psychotherapeutic treatments. Especially in research settings, duration of CBT is usually short, between 10 and 20 sessions. In routine clinical practice, duration varies depending on patient comorbidity, defined treatment goals, and the specific conditions of the health care system.

==== Behavioral therapy ====
Behavioral therapy helps change harmful ways of acting and gain control over behavior which is causing problems.

==== Interpersonal therapy ====
Interpersonal therapy helps one learn to relate better with others, express feelings, and develop better social skills. Interpersonal therapy helps the patient identify and cope through reoccurring conflicts within their relationships. Typically, the therapy will focus on one of the four specific problems, grief, social isolation, conflicts about roles and social expectations, or the effect of a major life change. A 2026 systematic review found that, for young people already diagnosed with anxiety or depression, mindfulness-based programs modestly eased depression in the short term but did not improve anxiety.

==== Family therapy ====
The principles of group dynamics are relevant to family therapists who must not only work with individuals, but with entire family systems. Family counseling can help families understand how a child's individual challenges may affect relations with parents and siblings and vice versa.

Therapists strive to understand not just what the group members say, but how these ideas are communicated (process). Therapists can help families improve the way they relate and thus enhance their own capacity to deal with the content of their problems by focusing on the process of their discussions. Virginia Satir expanded on the concept of how individuals behave and communicate in groups by describing several family roles that can serve to stabilize expected characteristic behavior patterns in a family. For instance, if one child is considered to be a "rebel child", a sibling may take on the role of the "good child" to alleviate some of the stress in the family. This concept of role reciprocity is helpful in understanding family dynamics because the complementary nature of roles makes behaviors more resistant to change.

==== Antidepressants ====
Clinicians usually recommend a selective serotonin reuptake inhibitor (SSRI) as a first line pharmacologic treatment for depression in adolescence. For children and adolescents with moderate-to-severe depressive disorder, fluoxetine seems to be the best treatment (either with or without cognitive behavioural therapy) but more research is needed to be certain. Sertraline, escitalopram, duloxetine might also help in reducing symptoms. Escitalopram and fluoxetine are among the safest antidepressants to give to children and adolescents. The combination of psychotherapy with medications has been shown to be more effective for the treatment of depression in adolescence than medications alone.

SSRIs act on the serotonin system that affects mood, arousal, anxiety, impulses, and aggression. SSRIs also appear to indirectly influence other neurotransmitter systems, including those involving norepinephrine and dopamine. Some possible adverse reactions of SSRIs include headache, gastrointestinal side effects, dry mouth, sedation or insomnia and activation. Activation refers to a state of psychomotor agitation that includes symptoms of insomnia, disinhibition and restlessness that may result in discontinuation of a medication. There is a rare risk of suicidal thoughts or behaviors with SSRIs especially when treatment is started or the dose is increased, with the rate being up to 0.7% as compared to placebo in early meta analyses of SSRIs in the treatment of adolescent depression. This led the FDA to issue a black box warning regarding this risk. Once remission is achieved, the medications are continued for at least 6 to 12 months and then there is consideration of discontinuing them. Early or premature discontinuation of medications, prior to 6 to 12 months of having achieved remission, is associated with an increased risk of relapse of the depression.

Other medications can be added to SSRIs if a partial response is achieved and further improvement is needed; these agents include lithium, bupropion and atypical antipsychotics. These options are medications that work in different ways. Bupropion (Wellbutrin) works through the neurotransmitters norepinephrine and dopamine, while mirtazapine (Remeron) affects transmission of norepinephrine and serotonin. The drugs venlafaxine (Effexor) and duloxetine (Cymbalta) work in part by simultaneously inhibiting the reuptake of serotonin and norepinephrine. The oldest drugs on the market are not prescribed often, but may be a good option for some women. These include tricyclic antidepressants (TCAs) and monoamine oxidase inhibitors (MAOIs). TCAs may cause side effects like dry mouth, constipation, or dizziness. MAOIs can cause sedation, insomnia, dizziness, and weight gain. To avoid the risk of a rapid rise in blood pressure, people taking MAOIs must also avoid eating a substance called tyramine, found in yogurt, aged cheese, pickles, beer, and red wine. Some drug side effects subside with time, while others may lessen when a drug dose is lowered.

In the US, as of 2021, the FDA has approved the SSRIs fluoxetine and escitalopram for the treatment of depression in adolescents but other SSRIS or serotonin norepinephrine reuptake inhibitors (SNRIs) are often used off label for treatment.

== Research ==
Differences in the brain's structure and function appear to be present in adolescents with depression though this may depend on age. Younger adolescents, mostly under the age of 18, with depression have shown greater white matter volume within frontal regions of the brain, greater cortical thickness in the anterior cingulate cortex and medial orbitofrontal cortex, as well as greater functional connectivity between cortico-limbic brain regions. Whereas older adolescents, mostly above the age of 18, appear to show lower cortical surface area in regions including the lingual, occipital gyri, as well as medial orbitofrontal and motor cortices. Results such as these have led to the hypothesis that the biological causes of depression may in part be neurodevelopmental, with its biological underpinnings forming early on in brain development.

== History ==
Although antidepressants were used by child and adolescent psychiatrists to treat major depressive disorder, they were not always used in young people with a comorbid conduct disorder because of the risks of overdose in such a population. Tricyclic antidepressant were the predominant antidepressants used at that time in this population. With the advent of selective serotonin re-uptake inhibitors (SSRIs), child and adolescent psychiatrists began prescribing more anti-depressants in the comorbid conduct disorder/major depressive group because of there was, and is, not a significant correlation of adverse response at higher doses. This raises the possibility that more effective treatment of these young people might also improve their outcomes in adult life. Although treatment rates are becoming more stable, there is a trend that suggests that little progress has been made in narrowing the mental health treatment gap for adolescent depression. The FDA has also placed a black box warning on using antidepressants, leading doctors to be hesitant on prescribing them to adolescents.

== Controversies ==
Throughout the development and research of this disorder, controversies have emerged over the legitimacy of depression in childhood and adolescence as a diagnosis, the proper measurement and validity of scales to diagnose, and the safety of particular treatments.

=== Legitimacy as a diagnosis ===
In early research of depression in children, there was debate as to whether or not children could clinically fit the criteria for major depressive disorder. However, since the 1970s, it has been accepted among the psychological community that depression in children can be clinically significant. The more pertinent controversy in psychology today centers around the clinical significance of sub-threshold mood disorders. This controversy stems from the debate regarding the definition of the specific criteria for a clinically significant depressed mood in relation to the cognitive and behavioral symptoms. Some psychologists argue that the effects of mood disorders in children and adolescents, or rather the few that exist but do not fully meet the criteria for depression, do not have severe enough risks. Children in this area of severity, they argue, should receive some sort of treatment since the effects could still be severe. However, since there has yet to be enough research or scientific evidence to support that children that fall within the area just shy of a clinical diagnosis require treatment, other psychologists are hesitant to support the dispensation of treatment.

=== Diagnosis controversy ===
In order to diagnose a child with depression, different screening measures and reports have been developed to help clinicians make a proper decision. However, the accuracy and effectiveness of certain measures that help psychologists diagnose children have come into question. Due to absence of strong evidence that screening children and adolescents for depression leads to improved mental health outcomes, it has been questioned whether it causes more harm than benefit. Questions have also surfaced about the safety and effectiveness of antidepressant medications.

==== Measurement reliability ====
The effectiveness of dimensional child self-report checklists has been criticized. Although literature has documented strong psychometric properties, other studies have shown a poor specificity at the top end of scales, resulting in most children with high scores not meeting the diagnostic criteria for depression. Another issue with reliability of measurement for diagnosis occurs in parent, teacher, and child reports. One study, which observed the similarities between child self-report and parent reports on the child's symptoms of depression, acknowledged that on more subjective symptom reports measures, the agreement was not significant enough to be considered reliable. Two self-report scales demonstrated an erroneous classification of 25% of children in both the depressed and controlled samples. A large concern in the use of self-report scales is the accuracy of the information collected. The main controversy is caused by uncertainty about how the data from these multiple informants can or should be combined to determine whether a child can be diagnosed with depression.

==== Treatment issues ====
The controversy over the use of antidepressants began in 2003 when Great Britain's Department of Health stated that, based on data collected by the Medicines and Healthcare products Regulatory Agency, paroxetine (an antidepressant) should not be used on patients under the age of 18. Since then, the United States Food and Drug Administration (FDA) has issued a warning describing the increased risk of adverse effects of antidepressants used as treatment in those under the age of 18. The main concern is whether the risks outweigh the benefits of the treatment. In order to decide this, studies often look at the adverse effects caused by the medication in comparison to the overall symptom improvement. While multiple studies have shown an improvement or efficacy rate of over 50%, the concern of severe side effects – such as suicidal ideation or suicidal attempts, worsening of symptoms, or increase in hostility – are still concerns when using antidepressants. However, an analysis of multiple studies argues that while the risk of suicidal ideation or attempt is present, the benefits significantly outweigh the risks. Due to the variability of these studies, it is currently recommended that if antidepressants are chosen as a method of treatment for children or adolescents, the clinician monitor closely for adverse symptoms, since there is still no definitive answer on why they are depressed.

In the UK, National Institute for Health and Care Excellence (NICE) guidelines state that antidepressants for children and adolescents with depression should be prescribed together with therapy and after being assessed by a child and adolescent psychiatrist. However, between 2006 and 2017, only 1 in 4 of 12-17 year olds who were prescribed an SSRI by their GP had seen a specialist psychiatrist and 1 in 6 has seen a paediatrician. Half of these prescriptions were for depression. Among the suggested possible reasons why GPs are not following the guidelines are the difficulties of accessing talking therapies, long waiting lists and the urgency of treatment. According to some researchers, strict adherence to treatment guidelines would limit access to effective medication for young people with mental health problems.

== See also ==
- Suicide among LGBT youth
- Youth suicide
