= List of awards and honors received by Gloria Steinem =

This list includes some of the academic, civic, and other awards and honors given to American activist Gloria Steinem.

== Academic honors ==
Title of award	Organization conferring	Date awarded
Honorary Doctor of Human Justice	Simmons College (Massachusetts)	5/20/1973
Degree of Common Sense	University of Life, Common Sense Co.	1978
In Recognition	Harvard Business School, Class of 1949	5/18/1979
"Ardent Activism" fake diploma	University of California, Davis University Extension	11/8/1981
Spirit of Achievement Award	New York Chapter, National Women's Division, Albert Einstein College of Medicine of Yeshiva University	5/17/1983
Creative Leadership Award	New York University School of Education, Health, Nursing, and Arts Professions	11/13/1985
Honorary Doctor of Laws	Wheaton College	5/31/1986
Honorary Doctor of Letters	Smith College	5/22/1988
Certificate of Honor	Barnard College Centennial Dinner	4/5/1989
Lavender Heart Award	University of New Mexico Women's Center	3/8/1992
Woman of Distinction Award	Kingsborough Community College Women's Center	5/11/1993
Honorary Doctor of Humane Letters	University of Toledo	6/12/1993
Associate Fellow of Ezra Stiles College	Yale University, Council of Masters	5/8/1998
Honorary Doctor of Humane Letters	Hobart & William Smith College	6/14/1998
Phi Beta Kappa Certificate of Recognition	PBK Zeta Chapter, American University	4/7/1999
Anne Roe Award	Harvard Graduate School of Education	5/13/1999
Distinguished Lecture Medallion	University of Iowa	2/9/2000
Otis Social Justice Award	Wheaton College	3/1/2000
Honorary Doctor of Humane Letters	Marietta College	5/7/2000
Honorary Doctor of Humane Letters	University of Lowell	6/3/2000
Honorary Doctor of Humane Letters	Pace University	5/24/2001
Honorary Doctor of Humane Letters	City University of New York	2/1/2002
Honorary Doctor of Humane Letters	Southern Methodist University	5/18/2002
Rosa L. Parks Woman of Courage Award	Troy State University Montgomery and Southern Poverty Law Center	3/18/2003
Honorary Doctor of Humane Letters	Albion College	4/15/2004
Missouri Honor Medal for Distinguished Service in Journalism	University of Missouri - Columbia	2/10/2005
Women of Vision Award	Women's Health Research at Yale University	4/21/2005
Distinguished Leadership in Arts and Humanities	Dyson College of Arts and Sciences, Pace University	4/6/2006
Honorary Doctor of Humane Letters	Hunter College of the City University of New York	6/1/2006
Logophile Award for Distinguished Achievement as a Writer	Writing Center of Marymount Manhattan College	3/7/2007
Honorary Doctor of Feminism	Feminist University of Toledo Ohio	5/1/2008
James Weldon Johnson Medal	James Weldon Johnson Institute for Advanced Interdisciplinary Studies, Emory University	11/4/2009
Radcliffe Institute Medal	Radcliffe Institute for Advanced Study	5/28/2010
Honorary Doctor of Law	Columbia University	5/16/2012
Honorary Doctor of Humane Letters	Washington University	5/18/2012
Special Collections Reading Room Dedication	Smith College	4/11/2022
International Advocate for Peace Award	Cardozo School of Law	3/30/2023
Honorary Doctor of Humanities D.H.	Bloomfield College	5/19/1976
Honorary Doctor of Human Justice	Simmons College (Massachusetts)	5/20/1973
Honorary Doctor of Humane Letters	Hofstra University	5/21/1984
Honorary Doctor of Humane Letters	University of Toledo	6/12/1993

== Awards from civic bodies ==
Title of award	Organization conferring	Date awarded
Ohio Governor's Award for Recognition of Excellence of Achievement in the Field of Journalism	Gov. John J. Gilligan, State of Ohio	2/11/1972
Honorary Mayor	City of San Antonio/La Villita	5/16/1975
Special Commendation	City and County of San Francisco	6/15/1981
Special Tribute	State of Michigan	6/12/1982
"Special Tribute" testimonial resolution	City of Detroit	7/15/1982
Ohio Women's Hall of Fame Inductee	Ohio Women's Hall of Fame	11/16/1983
Special Daughter of Ohio	State of Ohio, Office of the Governor Richard F. Celeste	5/20/1984
"Gloria Steinem Day" dedication	City of Toledo, OH	5/23/1984
Special Commendation	County of San Diego, CA	3/2/1985
Special Commendation	California Legislature	3/11/1987
Honorary Citizen	City of Louisville, KY	3/31/1987
Certificate of Merit	City of Erie, Pennsylvania	3/22/1990
Honorary Citizen	City of Tucson, Arizona	6/15/1990
Honorary Citizen	City of Knoxville, TN	2/15/1991
Gloria Steinem Day proclamation	City of Hollywood, FL	1/9/1992
National Women's History Month Honoree	Brooklyn Chamber of Commerce	3/25/1992
Official Welcome to the Twentieth Anniversary of the Alabama Women's Political Caucus	Alabama House of Representatives	4/30/1992
Special Honoree at Third Annual Self-Esteem and Responsibility Celebration	Los Angeles County Task Force to Promote Self-Esteem and Personal and Social Responsibility	6/4/1992
Honorary Citizen	City of Baltimore, MD	10/1/1992
Special Proclamation Honoring Gloria Steinem for her Work to Help Others Enhance Their Self Esteem	Santa Cruz County CA Board of Supervisors	2/9/1993
"Gloria Steinem Day" dedication	City of San Diego	2/11/1993
Certificate of Commendation	President of the United States, William J. Clinton	5/9/1994
Gloria Steinem at Aradia Women's Health Center Day	Office of the Mayor Norman B. Rice, City of Seattle, WA	6/4/1994
In Appreciation	Attorney General of Ohio	9/19/1994
In Appreciation	Attorney General of Ohio Lee Fisher	9/19/1994
Certificate of Merit	City of New Orleans	9/22/1994
Key to the City	City of Youngstown, OH	1997
Special Commendation	State of Hawaii	3/2/1997
Featured Speaker, Who's Who Banquet	City of Youngstown, OH	3/12/1997
Special Recognition testimonial resolution	County of Mahoning, OH	4/10/1997
Special Tribute	Congressman James A. Traficant Jr. of OH	4/19/1997
Gloria Steinem Day proclamation	Township of Poland, OH	4/19/1997
Women's History Month Proclamation and Dedication	City of New York	3/1998
Appreciation of Contribution to the "Celebrate the Century" 1920s 19th Amendment Commemorative Stamp	United States Postal Service	6/27/1998
Ohioana Pegasus Award	State of Ohio	10/15/1998
Living Legend	Library of Congress	2000
Woman of Courage and Action Award	Women's Building, California State Senate	3/3/2000
Certificate of Special Congressional Recognition	United States Congress, Carolyn B. Maloney	3/13/2000
Living Landmark	New York Landmarks Conservancy	11/7/2001
Special Recognition	Office of the Governor Janet Napolitano, State of Arizona	10/15/2007
Honorary Tennessean	State of Tennessee, Gov. Phil Bredesen	10/29/2007
Sunshine Ambassador	City of St. Petersburg, FL	3/8/2008
Special Commendation	City of San Diego Human Relations Commission	2009
Presidential Medal of Freedom	White House	11/20/2013
Ohio Civil Rights Hall of Fame	State of Ohio	10/2/2014
Ceres Medal for Revolutionary Feminism, the Path to Humanism	Food and Agriculture Organization of the United Nations	no date
Certificate of Recognition	Illinois House of Representatives	no date
Distinguished Recognition Award	City of Detroit	no date
Key to the City	City of Dade, FL	no date
Key to the City	City of Dallas, TX	no date
Key to the City	City of Kansas City, MO	no date
Key to the City	City of Miami Beach, FL	no date
Key to the City	City of Nashua, NH	no date
Key to the City	City of New Bedford, MA	no date
Key to the City of Longview	Office of the Mayor of Longview, TX	21/5/1985
Special Recognition for Lifetime Achievement	Ohio State House of Representatives	no date
Resolution Recognizing Gloria Steinem and Welcoming Her to Alabama	State Senate of Alabama	11/3/1995
In Appreciation	United States Customs Service	3/27/1997

== Awards and honors from other organizations ==
Title of award	Organization conferring	Date awarded
Honors for Excellence, Outstanding Individual Achievements in Entertainment, 1964-1965 Emmy Awards (for Scriptwriting on That Was the Week That Was)	National Academy of Television Arts and Sciences	1965
Honoree	Directors Guild of America, Annual Awards Dinner	2/17/1968
Honoree	Penney-Missouri Magazine Awards	1970
Certificate of Appreciation	National Press Club	1/24/1972
Person of the Year	Hasty Pudding Theatricals 125th Annual Production	2/28/1973
National Fellowship Award	Fellowship Commission	5/1/1974
"It Takes A Wise Bird" award	Women's Advertising Club of Detroit	10/29/1974
Award of Honor, for Raising the Consciousness of the Human Race Enriching the Spirit of the new Aquarian Age Planting the Seeds for Our Return to the Stars	Aquarian Church of the Brothers and Sisters of Jesus Christ	11/1/1974
Bill of Rights Award	ACLU of Southern California	1975
Special Commendation for Outstanding Work in the Field of Human Rights and for Service Rendered in Behalf of All Women	Dade County Chapter of the National Organization for Women	2/7/1977
Award for Outstanding contributions to civil liberties	ACLU of New Jersey	11/5/1977
Top 25 Most Influential Women in America, 1978	World Almanac	1978
Humanist Pioneer	The American Humanist Association	1978
Tenth Anniversary Honor	Women's Equity Action League	6/5/1978
Award of Excellence	Authors & Celebrities Forum	6/9/1978
Humanist Pioneer Award	Association for Humanist Sociology	6/12/1978
Honoree	Organization of Women for Legal Awareness	1979
Outstanding Woman's Leadership Award	unknown	1979
In Appreciation	American Marketing Association, Southern California Chapter	11/1979
Front Page Award for Best Magazine Column	Newswomen's Club of New York	11/14/1980
Certificate of Appreciation	National Women's Political Caucus of Contra Costa County	2/21/1981
Lifetime Membership	Women Organized for Employment, San Francisco, CA	6/26/1981
International Charisma Award	unknown	1982
5th Annual Lucretia Mott Award	Women's Way, Philadelphia PA	5/12/1982
Outstanding Professional	Women in Magazine Publishing	12/1/1982
Appreciation for contribution to our 1983 Career Woman's Seminar Program	Sales and Marketing Executives of Memphis, Inc	1983
Woman of Achievement in the Mainstream of Life of the World	Women's Pavilion, Louisiana World Exposition	1984
In Appreciation	Federal Women's Program	5/1/1984
Certificate of Appreciation	National Press Club	6/20/1984
Robert Livingston Human Rights Award	Human Rights Campaign Fund	1985
Excellence in Women's Sports Journalism Award, Print Media	Women's Sports Foundation	1985
Living Legacy Award	Women's International Center	3/2/1985
In Appreciation	CBS Television Network	11/12/1985
18th Annual Creative Leadership Award	School of Education, Health, Nursing and Arts Professions of New York University	11/13/1985
Certificate of Appreciation	Atlanta Advertising club	11/18/1985
In Appreciation	Atlanta Advertising club	11/18/1985
Outstanding Professional in Communications	March of the Dimes	12/1/1985
Honoree	Tenth Annual William O. Douglas Award Dinner	1986
Women of Excellence Award	CUNY Women's Coalition	5/16/1986
Best-Dressed Eyes Award	Vision Industry Council of America	1987
Certificate of Appreciation	Women's Equality Day. Federal Women's Program	8/27/1987
Nominee, Direct Marketing Woman of the Year	Women's Equality Day. Federal Women's Program	9/30/1987
Certificate of Appreciation for Speaking at Banquet	"Power of Ideas" banquet. City Club of Cleveland	10/28/1987
Dedication	National Gay Rights Advocates	11/20/1987
Liberty Award	Lambda Legal Defense and Education Fund	1989
Manhattan Award	unknown	1989
Certificate of Appreciation	March for Women's Equality/Women's Lives, National Organization for Women	4/9/1989
Exceptional Achievement Award	The Women's Project	6/5/1989
Honoree	Flo Kennedy Media Awards	1990
Woman of the Year	Police Athletic League	12/6/1990
Appreciation Plaque	Alabama Women's Political Caucus	5/2/1992
Woman of Vision Award for Excellence in Communications	National Organization for Women NYC	10/19/1992
Dedicatory plaque	YWCA Grand Rapids, MI	11/4/1992
Conference room dedication	YWCA Grand Rapids, MI	11/4/1992
National Contribution Award	National Council for Self-Esteem	1993
Inductee	National Women's Hall of Fame	1993
Outstanding New Yorker Award	New York Society of Association Executives	2/18/1993
I'm Every Woman Award	NYU Women's Herstory Month Committee	4/1/1993
Inductee	National Women's Hall of Fame	10/9/1993
A Salute to Manhattan's Woman of Vision	The National Arts Club of New York City	3/23/1993
Honorary Advisory Board Member	National Council for Self-Esteem	1/15/1994
Lifetime Achievement Award	Parenting Magazine	1995
Lifetime Achievement Award	Parenting Magazine	1995
Special Guest of Honor	NOW Alliance PAC of Long Island NY	4/27/1995
Certificate of Appreciation	Federation of Child Care Centers of Alabama	11/4/1995
Dr. Bessie "Courage When You Don't Have Permission" Award	Having Our Say on Broadway	11/7/1995
Justice Harry A. Blackmun Reproductive Freedom Award	Family Planning Council of Southeastern Pennsylvania	11/16/1995
Medal of Honor	Veteran Feminists of America	12/13/1995
Freedom Award	Cesar E. Chavez	1996
A Bold Leader Connecting Women	Today's Chiropractic Magazine	1996
No award title	Women's Action Alliance	5/22/1996
Exceptional Merit Media Awards	National Women's Political Caucus & Radcliffe College	1997
"Your Commitment Inspires Us"	National Gay Rights Advocates	11/20/1997
The Cutty Award for being an "associate" in the economic empowerment of the people of Harlem	unknown	11/23/1997
Hall of Fame Award	American Society of Magazine Editors	4/29/1998
23rd National Conference on Men & Masculinity Award	National Organization for Men Against Sexism	8/1/1998
"Woman Who Has Made A Difference" Award	National Council for Research on Women	1999
Annual Award	Philadelphia Physicians for Social Responsibility	1999
Exceptional Woman in Publishing Award	EWIP	1999
Special Recognition	Feminist Majority Foundation	4/2/2000
Women's Luncheon Honoree	National Down Syndrome Society	5/9/2001
Certificate of Appreciation	Long Island Center for Business & Professional Women	12/10/2001
On Wings of Leadership Award	OWL	2002
Award of Honor	PEN USA West	2002
Woman of Achievement Recognition	Women's History Month	3/20/2002
Appreciation/dedication?	Boettcher Concert Hall, Denver Performing Arts Complex	5/28/2002
AAUW Achievement Award	AAUW Educational Foundation	2003
Honoree	Working Families Party	6/12/2003
Eldership Award	Pacific Institute	2004
Stand Up For Choice award	Planned Parenthood Action Fund	4/1/2004
Honorary Crust Busting Award	Crust Busting w/ Dr. Pat Baccili	5/2004
Vanguard Award	Women's Leadership Exchange	2005
"Woman Who Has Changed the Landscape for Women" award	Centre for the Advancement of Women	9/7/2005
Shirley Sacks Women's Health Award	National Council on Women's Health	12/13/2005
Ridenhour Courage Award		2006
Trailblazer Award	Forbes Executive Women's Forum	2006
President's Award	National Association of Women Business Owners	2007
Woman of Courage Award	Domestic Violence Crisis Center	2007
Honoree	Center for Community Solutions: Healing and Preventing Sexual Assault and Relationship Violence	3/14/2007
Honoree	The Progressive Forum of Houston, Texas	9/17/2007
Minerva Award	unknown	2008
Bella Award for Lifelong Dedication to All Women	unknown	2010
	Glamour Women of the Year Awards	7/11/2011
Elizabeth Boyer Award	Women's Equity Action League	9/24/2012
Gamechanger Award	Girls Write Now	2014
Community Ally Award	The Lesbian, Gay, Bisexual, & Transgender Community Center	11/15/2014
In 2019 Time created 89 new covers to celebrate women of the year starting from 1920; it chose Steinem for 1970.	Time	2019
Princess of Asturias Foundation	2021	
BBC 100 Women	BBC	November 2023
"Thank You" from the Women at Work of Union Pacific	Women of Union Pacific	no date
Nike Prize for Distinguished Achievement to Promote the Rights of Women	Committee of the Nike Prize	no date
Deadline Club Hall of Fame, for Lifetime Achievement in Journalism	Society of Professional Journalists	no date
Society of Writers Award	United Nations	no date
Sarah Curry Awards for Women Who Pave the Way	Little Missionary's Day Nursery	no date
Honoree	Mount Sinai Rape Crisis Intervention Program	no date
Honoree (with Ms. Magazine)	North American Menopause Society	no date
Lifetime Achievement in Supporting Reproductive Rights	Personal PAC	no date
Dedication to Human Rights Activism Award	Equality Now	no date
In Appreciation	NOW Macomb County MI Chapter	no date
In Appreciation	NOW Oakland County MI chapter	no date
In Appreciation	NOW Ann Arbor-Washtenaw County MI chapter	no date
In Appreciation	NOW Detroit MI chapter	no date
Certificate of Appreciation	Judges and Lawyers Breast Cancer Alert	no date
In Appreciation	Texas Women's Political Caucus	no date
Accolade for Professionalism in Communications	Advertising/Communications Times, Philadelphia PA	no date
For Her Dedication To The Ms. Foundation	Ms. Foundation/SER	no date
