= Self-esteem instability =

Fragile and vulnerable feelings

Self-esteem stability refers to immediate feelings of self-esteem which, generally, will not be influenced by everyday positive or negative experiences. In contrast, unstable self-esteem refers to fragile and vulnerable feelings of self-esteem which will be influenced by internally generated, such as reflecting on one's social life, and externally received evaluative information, for example a compliment or a failed course. Rosenberg makes a distinction of baseline instability and barometric instability. Baseline instability are long term fluctuations in self-esteem that occur slowly and over an extended period of time. For example, decreases in self-esteem level are common as children transition from the relatively safe environment of elementary school to the more turbulent middle school environment, often followed by slow but steady increases in self-esteem through the high school years. Barometric instability, on the other hand, reflects short term fluctuations in one's contextually based global self-esteem. This means that someone with an unstable self-esteem will value him/herself positively on one day, but negatively on the other, this can even vary with every situation. One important feature of individuals with unstable self-esteem is how they can react very strongly on experiences that they view as relevant for their self-esteem, within this they can even see relevance for their self-esteem when there is not. Unstable self-esteem may take numerous forms. Some people may experience dramatic shifts from feeling very positively to very negatively about themselves, others may primarily fluctuate in the extent to which they feel positively or negatively about themselves. Another distinction made in the research on stability of self-esteem is between fragile and secure high self-esteem. Secure high self-esteem reflects positive feelings of self-worth that are well anchored and secure and that are positively associated with a wide range of psychological health and well-being indices. Fragile high self-esteem, however, reflects positive feelings of self-worth that are vulnerable to threat, as they require continual bolstering, protection, and validation through various self-protective or self-enhancement strategies.

== Effects ==
Research on self-esteem in adolescence and adults has shown the importance of a stable self-esteem in terms of social-emotional functioning. Unstable self-esteem is negatively viewed and research has shown that an unstable self-esteem is an important predictor for internalizing and externalizing problems. For example, they found that self-esteem variability is a predictor of social anxiety, public self-consciousness, and self-perceptions that interpersonal problems reflect social avoidance. Self-esteem variability was also negatively associated with frequency of social interactions in the course of daily life. They concluded that self-esteem variability is associated with fear and avoidance of social contexts. Furthermore, they also found that self-esteem variability interacts with self-esteem in the prediction of depression. Self-esteem was most predictive of depression for persons high in self-esteem variability. According to them it seems reasonable to conclude from these and earlier findings that individuals may be vulnerable to depressive tendencies as a result of high variability in, and low levels of, self-esteem.

== Development of (un)stable self-esteem ==
Several research has been done on the development of (in)stability of self-esteem. These studies provide converging evidence about the stability of self-esteem between the ages of 6 and 83. There was found that stability is relatively low during early childhood (probably because of lack of cognitive growth), increases throughout adolescence and young adulthood, and then declines during midlife and old age.

Little is known about the underlying causes of stability and change in self-esteem.

However some research has been done, for example on genetic and environmental influences in adolescence. Genetic effects might account for stability, another possibility is that different genes may get turned on later in adolescence, which would result in genetic effects contributing to change.

Environmental factors could also play a role, such as stressful life events may lead to changes in self-esteem during adolescence. Results of a study by Kamakura indicated that stability in self-esteem was due to genetic effect and in addition there was found that environmental factors partly explained stability in self-esteem.

It is however uncertain which aspects of non-shared environmental factors influence stability in self-esteem. Factors including overreliance on the evaluations, love, and approval of others, an impoverished self-concept, and excessive dependency needs have been implicated for why immediate feelings of self-worth of some individuals are highly unstable.

Furthermore, developmentally, harsh or controlling family environments are thought to promote fragile, unstable feelings of self-worth. A father who is misogynistic – consciously or unconsciously – and who displays psychological manipulation, control etc. of the mother and child is also a major underlying factor.

Possessing a well-developed self-concept also is implicated in optimal psychological functioning. When self-knowledge is confused and conflicted it will fail to provide meaningful input into people's behaviours and reactions and instead promote heightened responsiveness to immediately salient situational cues and outcomes. When these cues and outcomes are negative, this heightened responsiveness can be particularly detrimental. Having a poorly developed self-concept may lead individuals to rely on and be more affected by specific evaluative information, thereby enhancing unstable self-esteem.

== Measurement ==
There are two well-known measures of self-esteem instability. The Harter Pictorial Scale of Perceived Competence and Social Acceptance for Young Children (PSPCSA) can just be used for children aged 4 to 7. The PSPCSA is focused on four scales: cognitive competence, physical competence, peer acceptance, and maternal acceptance. Every scale contains 6 items and each item contains two pictures of a certain action or activities (for example, a child doing a puzzle or playing with other children). A pictorial format engages a young child's interest, is understandable, sustains the child's attention, and leads to more meaningful responses. For each item the tested child is read a brief statement about each child depicted in the pictures. The first task is to indicate which of the two children it is most like. The second task is to indicate how much it is like the child on the chosen picture, a lot (represented as a big circle) or a little (represented as a small circle). When conducting this test longitudinally (for example five days in a row) the stability of self-esteem can be measured, the higher the standard-deviation, the more unstable the self-esteem is. The second measurement is the Rosenberg self-esteem scale (RSES). This is a 10-item Likert-type scale designed to measure global self-esteem, but when taken longitudinally it can be used as a measure for self-esteem instability.
