= Relationship-contingent self-esteem =

Type of self-esteem

Relationship contingent self-esteem (RCSE) is a type of self-esteem that derives from the outcomes, process, and nature of one's romantic relationship. Like other types of contingent self-esteem, it is generally linked with lower levels of self-esteem and well-being. It can be unhealthy for the relationship because it paves the way for excessive bias for negative interpretations of relationship events.

Past research has shown that relationship-contingent self-esteem is independent on feelings of commitment to one's relationship, closeness to one's partner, and satisfaction in the relationship. Also, this research showed that it was linked to "obsessive immersion or preoccupation" with the romantic relationship.

== Measurement ==
Past research has measured RCSE with a psychological scale consisting of 11 items. The scale contains two related sub-scales: the general Contingent Self-Esteem Scale and the Contingencies of Self-Worth Scale. The internal consistency of the scale is high, as is the two-week test-retest reliability.

== Psychological properties ==
=== Attachment style ===
Like other types of contingent self-esteem, RCSE is generally linked with lower levels of self-esteem and well-being. It is also associated with excessive reassurance seeking behavior, preoccupied attachment style, and insecure attachment style. Ironically, these styles of attachment do not allow the person to attain the relationship security that they seek. For example, displaying excessive reassurance seeking behavior from one's partner can be a source of discord and strain on the relationship. In addition, those with insecure attachment styles are less able to seek support and care giving in effective ways from their partners.

=== Rejection sensitivity ===
Those who are high in RCSE are often high in rejection sensitivity. High rejection sensitivity is the tendency to anxiously expect rejection from one's significant other. Those who are high in rejection sensitivity act much more negatively in a discussion about relationship conflict with their significant others than do those who are low in rejection sensitivity. In turn, this may cause the highly rejection sensitive individual's partners to feel angrier after a discussion about conflict than do partners of individuals low in rejection sensitivity.

== How RCSE affects goals ==
=== Pursuing relationship success for self-esteem ===
When self-esteem is contingent upon an external domain of life, in this case, the relationship, it will motivate a person to pursue short-term and long-term goals that enhance and promote that domain (i.e. the relationship). People with RCSE will want to prove that they are a success in their relationship because it will validate their sense of self.

=== Approval sex motives in women ===
One example of the unhealthy nature of relationship-contingent self-esteem is the link between RCSE and greater approval sex motives. Sexual motivation may involve intimacy motives (i.e. the drive to create further intimacy or closeness) or approval sex motives (i.e. the drive to avoid disapproval from one's partner about frequency or quality of sex). Since theories about relationship contingent self-esteem posit that individuals who derive their self-esteem based on relationship outcomes may be more motivated than others to avoid negative outcomes and increase positive outcomes, it follows that these motives may apply in the sexual motivation arena. A study by Sanchez and colleagues investigated the relationship between relationship contingent self-worth, approval sex motives, intimacy motives, sexual autonomy, and sexual satisfaction among women in committed relationships.

== Costs ==
=== To autonomy ===
RCSE may lead to low levels of autonomy by causing a person in a relationship to cater to the other person's needs or the needs of the relationship at the expense of the needs of his or her self. For example, if RCSE affects sexual motives by shifting the focus from achieving intimacy to garnering approval from one's partner, this may lower sexual autonomy and satisfaction.

In general, when people are extremely motivated to protect or enhance self-esteem, they are more susceptible to stress or anxiety because failure to do so results in a loss of self-esteem. Thus, for a person whose self-esteem is contingent upon relationship success, they will be motivated to maintain and enhance the relationship in order to protect their own self-esteem. This may result in losing the sense of autonomy, or the sense that one is the originator of one's own behavior and is doing things because one wants to rather than because one has to. A person who views losing the relationship as a threat to oneself may act out of fear rather than confidence and self-expression, thereby losing a sense of autonomy.

=== To relationship ===
RCSE is thought to be unhealthy for the relationship because it paves the way for excessive bias for negative interpretations of relationship events. A negative interpretive bias will in turn affect a person's behavior toward his or her partner. For example, since RCSE is often associated with having high levels of rejection sensitivity, the negative effects of rejection sensitivity will often damage the relationships of those with highly relationship contingent self-esteem. A daily diary study of members of committed romantic couple's thoughts and moods revealed that partners of highly rejection sensitive women showed notable upsurges in relationship dissatisfaction and thoughts of ending their relationships. In addition, being a person who is high in rejection sensitivity in a relationship predicted breakup within a year. When RCSE causes greater approval sex motives which in turn diminish a feeling of genuine sexual satisfaction, it may have negative consequences on the relationship by reducing sexual autonomy and satisfaction. This has implications not just for the individual suffering from it directly but probably also for his or her partner, who is likely to sense his or her partner's levels of sexual autonomy and satisfaction. Having RCSE can make a person preoccupied with his or her own perceptions of the events in the relationship and perceptions of his or her partner's behavior at the expense of considering the partner's perceptions and experience. Excessive rumination and preoccupation with the state of the relationship because of a sense of pressure to keep up the relationship may eat up cognitive and emotional resources, which in turn may diminish the capacity to empathize with the partner's experience. As a result, partners of individuals with RCSE may begin to distrust these individuals' motivations and drives within the relationship.

=== To health ===
Since having self-worth that is contingent upon the success of one's relationship will motivate one to pursue success in order to preserve self-esteem, some researchers believe that the anxiety and stress associated with such pursuits will lead to long-term physical and mental health problems. Long term anxiety and stress can activate the pituitary-adrenal-cortical system, which can in turn lead to increases in cholesterol and triglycerides in the blood stream. This in turn elevates the risk for heart disease. Another pathway to physical health problems is through unhealthy attempts at coping. For example, college students whose appearance and image contribute to their level of self-esteem may engage in unhealthy behaviors such as binge drinking and excessive partying. In addition, past research has shown that people who are more concerned with how others evaluate and perceive them tend to diet excessively, smoke, undergo cosmetic surgery, and consume more alcohol. In the realm of mental health, self-esteem that is highly unstable can contribute to higher levels of depressive symptoms.

== Alternatives ==
=== Non-contingent self-esteem ===
The healthy alternative to RCSE is to develop non-contingent self-esteem. This approach would require those in relationships to abandon external outcomes as a source for their own self-worth. By doing so, it would free up their energies to relate on a mindful level to their relationship partner. By shifting one's source of self-worth from approval from others to compassion towards others, for instance, minor setbacks in a relationship will not be so alarming because it will not threaten the sense of self.

=== Self-compassion vs. self-esteem ===
Alternatively, one can nurture self-compassion instead of self-esteem. Self-compassion researcher Professor Kristin Neff describes self-compassion as a combination of nurturing self-kindness over self-judgment, a sense of humanity over isolation, and a state of mindfulness rather than over-identification. A person experiencing distress who exercises self-compassion would be gentle towards him or herself rather than be harsh and critical and would recognize that he or she is not alone- rather, all people suffer at some point or another. This approach, Professor Neff and colleagues have found, can be beneficial for romantic relationships. In their study, self-compassion, not self-esteem, was significantly linked with greater relationship satisfaction. In addition, the presence of self-compassion predicted more positive relationship behaviors and less negative behaviors.

== Culture ==
Research on RCSE has only been conducted in American samples. In collectivist cultures, life satisfaction is often a result of living in harmony with the community and within one's relationships with others rather than the attainment of high self-esteem. Therefore, it is unclear whether there is a difference in prevalence of RCSE among different nations and cultures. Some researchers believe that the pursuit of a self-esteem, which is a hallmark consequence of all types of contingent self-esteem, is a fundamentally American phenomenon. The Protestant Ethic and ideas of self-reliance and meritocracy may lead Americans to believe that self-worth must be earned by performance and attainment, and that some people are worthier than others.

== Conceptual importance for psychology ==
RCSE, while a construct still in its infancy in psychology research, is an important model for psychology because it challenges and expands upon existing notions of self-esteem. First of all, RCSE distinguishes between levels of state self-esteem and trait self-esteem. Whereas trait self-esteem seems to be relatively stable over time, state self-esteem can fluctuate in relatively short periods of time depending on circumstances, successes, and failures. RCSE affects the state levels of self-esteem by boosting self-esteem if the relationship is going well, but diminishing it when it is not. In addition, the construct of RCSE challenges existing theory by suggesting that self-esteem does not exist in a vacuum, but that it is contingent upon success in one or more domains. Those domains may be internal or external. RCSE is an example of an contingency on an external domain, namely that of romantic relationships.

=== Future research ===
Future research can investigate whether RCSE differs among cultures and contexts and whether it has harmful consequences in all cultures. In addition, more research can examine whether there are gender differences in relationship contingent self-esteem, and if so, what the nature of those differences are. Research on RCSE's developmental trajectory can illuminate the factors that contribute to shaping it. Further research on negative implications of RCSE can inform interventions and therapies designed to steer people away from RCSE and towards more healthy alternatives, such as self-compassion or non-contingent self-esteem.
