= Denis Waitley =

American writer and speaker (1933–2025)

Denis E. Waitley
- Born: June 6, 1933
- Died: June 7, 2025 (aged 92)
- Occupations: Motivational speaker Consultant; Author
- Known for: Author of The Psychology of Winning

Denis E. Waitley (June 6, 1933 – June 7, 2025) was an American motivational speaker, writer and consultant. He has been recognized as the best-selling author of the audio series, The Psychology of Winning and books such as Seeds of Greatness and The Winner's Edge. Waitley has been inducted into the International Speakers' Hall of Fame. Denis died on June 7, 2025.

== Early life and education ==
Waitley was born in San Diego, California. His mother was a factory worker and his father worked in a warehouse, after serving during World War II. Waitley's parents divorced when he was ten and he had little contact with his father thereafter. He attended the United States Naval Academy at Annapolis and became a naval aviator after graduation. Waitley received a Bachelor of Science from the Naval Academy.

== Career ==
After leaving the navy, Waitley became a financial public relations representative for an electronics company. Later, he was offered a job by Jonas Salk to be a fundraiser at the Salk Institute for Biological Studies. In 1976, Waitley recorded some of the audiotape that would become The Psychology of Winning at a local church. He released the audio program in 1978, which has sold more than 2 million copies and generated $100 million in sales.

During the 1980s through the 2000s, Waitley released more than 15 books such as Seeds of Greatness, The Winner's Edge and Empires of the Mind. In 2007, Waitley announced his retirement from the board of directors of Usana after Usana found that contrary to his claims, Waitley did not hold a graduate degree from the US Navy, and that Waitley's Ph.D. credentials were similarly unverifiable.

Waitley was also a founding member of the National Council for Self-Esteem and a former chairman of psychology for the U.S. Olympic Committee's Sports Medicine Council.

== Death ==
Waitley died on June 7, 2025, one day after his 92nd birthday.

== Selected bibliography ==
Waitley has authored 16 books and has released more than 10 best-selling audio programs.

- The Psychology of Winning (1979) ISBN 978-0959494808
- Seeds of Greatness (1983) ISBN 0-671-49936-X,
- The New Dynamics of Winning: Gain the Mind-Set of a Champion for Unlimited Success in Business and Life (1993) ISBN 0-688-14227-3
- The Dragon And The Eagle
- Safari to the Soul (2004) ISBN 2-923209-03-6
- The Seeds of Greatness Treasury
- The Psychology of Winning for Women (1999) ISBN 1-890009-13-X
- Being the Best (1987) ISBN 0-671-70167-3
- The Winners Edge: The Critical Attitude of Success (1985) ISBN 0-425-08282-2
- The Joy of Working (1986) ISBN 0-345-33487-6
- The New Dynamics of Goal Setting: Flextactics for a Fast-changing World (1996) ISBN 0-688-12668-5
- Psychology of Success: Developing Your Self-esteem (1996) ISBN 0256194777
- Quantum Fitness: Breakthrough to Excellence (1986) ISBN 0-671-61825-3
- Empires of the Mind: Lessons to Lead and Succeed in a Knowledge-based World (1995) ISBN 0-688-14033-5
