= Self-esteem =

Human emotional need

Self-esteem is confidence in one's own worth, abilities, or morals. Self-esteem encompasses beliefs about oneself (for example, "I am loved", "I am worthy") as well as emotional states, such as triumph, despair, pride, and shame. Smith and Mackie define it by saying "The self-concept is what we think about the self; self-esteem, is the positive or negative evaluations of the self, as in how we feel about it (see self)."

The construct of self-esteem has been shown to be a desirable one in psychology, as it is associated with a variety of positive outcomes, such as academic achievement, relationship satisfaction, happiness, and lower rates of criminal behavior. The benefits of high self-esteem are thought to include improved mental and physical health, and less anti-social behavior while drawbacks of low self-esteem have been found to be anxiety, loneliness, and increased vulnerability to substance abuse.

Self-esteem can apply to a specific attribute or globally. Psychologists usually regard self-esteem as an enduring personality characteristic (trait self-esteem), though normal, short-term variations (state self-esteem) also exist. Synonyms or near-synonyms of self-esteem include: self-worth, self-regard, self-respect, and self-integrity.

Several studies suggest that socially engaged activities can improve adolescents' self-esteem, mental well-being, and overall health. These include volunteering, leadership programs, and participation in youth councils. In most cases, this positive association depends on participation being voluntary rather than compulsory. Youth volunteering has also been linked to higher income in adulthood.

Self-esteem typically declines from ages 4–8 as children compare their real and ideal selves, rises rapidly during adolescence and young adulthood, increases gradually through middle adulthood, peaks around ages 60–70, then declines again in later life.

== History ==
The concept of self-esteem has its origins in the 18th century, first expressed in the writings of the Scottish enlightenment thinker David Hume. Hume posits that it is important to value and think well of oneself because it serves a motivational function that enables people to explore their full potential. Milton's Paradise Lost includes the line that "nothing profits more than self-esteem."

The identification of self-esteem as a distinct psychological construct has its origins in the work of philosopher and psychologist, William James. James identified multiple dimensions of the self, with two levels of hierarchy: processes of knowing (called the "I-self") and the resulting knowledge about the self (the "Me-self"). The observation about the self and storage of those observations by the I-self creates three types of knowledge, which collectively account for the Me-self, according to James. These are the material self, social self, and spiritual self. The social self comes closest to self-esteem, comprising all characteristics recognized by others. The material self consists of representations of the body and possessions and the spiritual self of descriptive representations and evaluative dispositions regarding the self. This view of self-esteem as the collection of an individual's attitudes toward itself remains today.

In the mid-1960s, social psychologist Morris Rosenberg defined self-esteem as a feeling of self-worth and developed the Rosenberg self-esteem scale (RSES), which became the most widely used scale to measure self-esteem in the social sciences.

In the early 20th century, the behaviorist movement shunned introspective study of mental processes, emotions, and feelings, replacing introspection with objective study through experiments on behaviors observed in relation with the environment. Behaviorism viewed the human being as an animal subject to reinforcements, and suggested making psychology an experimental science, similar to chemistry or biology. Consequently, clinical trials on self-esteem were overlooked, since behaviorists considered the idea less amenable to rigorous measurement.

In the mid-20th century, the rise of phenomenology and humanistic psychology led to a renewed interest in self-esteem as a treatment for psychological disorders such as depression, anxiety, and personality disorders. Psychologists started to consider the relationship between psychotherapy and the personal satisfaction of people with high self-esteem as useful to the field. This led to new elements being introduced to the concept of self-esteem, including the reasons why people tend to feel less worthy and why people become discouraged or unable to meet challenges by themselves.

In 1992, the political scientist Francis Fukuyama associated self-esteem with what Plato called thymos—the "spiritedness" part of the Platonic soul.

From 1997, the core self-evaluations approach included self-esteem as one of four dimensions that comprise one's fundamental appraisal of oneself—along with locus of control, neuroticism, and self-efficacy. The concept of core self-evaluations has since proven to have the ability to predict job satisfaction and job performance. Self-esteem may be essential to self-evaluation.

=== In public policy ===
The importance of self-esteem gained endorsement from some government and non-government groups starting around the 1970s, such that one can speak of a self-esteem movement. This movement provides evidence that psychological research can shape public policy. This has expanded to recent years, such as in 2023, when psychologists are planning to re-invent the approach to research, treatments, and therapy. The new approach emphasizes population health where psychological researchers have prioritized one-one therapy in regards to analyzing social emotional conflict like low self-esteem. The underlying idea of the movement was that low self-esteem was the root of problems for individuals, making it the root of societal problems and dysfunctions. A leading figure of the movement, psychologist Nathaniel Branden, stated: "[I] cannot think of a single psychological problem (from anxiety and depression to fear of intimacy or of success, to spouse battery or child molestation) that is not traced back to the problem of low self-esteem".

It was once thought that self-esteem was primarily a feature of Western individualistic societies, as it was not observed in collectivist cultures such as Japan. Concern about low self-esteem and its many presumed negative consequences led California assemblyman, John Vasconcellos to work to set up and fund the Task Force on Self-Esteem and Personal and Social Responsibility, in California, in 1986. Vasconcellos argued that this task force could combat many of the state's problems – from crime and teen pregnancy to school underachievement and pollution. He compared increasing self-esteem to giving out a vaccine for a disease: it could help protect people from being overwhelmed by life's challenges.

The task force set up committees in many California counties and formed a committee of scholars to review the available literature on self-esteem. This committee found very small associations between low self-esteem and its assumed consequences, ultimately showing that low self-esteem was not the root of all societal problems and not as important as the committee had originally thought. However, the authors of the paper that summarized the review of the literature still believed that self-esteem is an independent variable that affects major social problems. The task force disbanded in 1995, and the National Council for Self-Esteem and later the National Association for Self-Esteem (NASE) was established, taking on the task force's mission. Vasconcellos and Jack Canfield were members of its advisory board in 2003, and members of its masters' coalition included Anthony Robbins, Bernie Siegel, and Gloria Steinem.

== Theories ==
Many early theories suggested that self-esteem is a basic human need or motivation. American psychologist, Abraham Maslow included self-esteem in his hierarchy of human needs. He described two different forms of "esteem": the need for respect from others in the form of recognition, success, and admiration, and the need for self-respect in the form of self-love, self-confidence, skill, or aptitude. Respect from others was believed to be more fragile and easily lost than inner self-esteem. According to Maslow, without the fulfillment of the self-esteem need, individuals will be driven to seek it and unable to grow and obtain self-actualization. Maslow also states that the healthiest expression of self-esteem "is the one which manifests in the respect we deserve for others, more than renown, fame, and flattery". Modern theories of self-esteem explore the reasons humans are motivated to maintain a high regard for themselves. Sociometer theory maintains that self-esteem evolved to check one's level of status and acceptance in one's social group. According to Terror Management Theory, self-esteem serves a protective function and reduces anxiety about life and death.

Carl Rogers (1902–1987), an advocate of humanistic psychology, theorized the origin of many people's problems to be that they despise themselves and consider themselves worthless and incapable of being loved. This is why Rogers believed in the importance of giving unconditional acceptance to a client and when this was done it could improve the client's self-esteem. In his therapy sessions with clients, he offered positive regard no matter what. Indeed, the concept of self-esteem is approached since then in humanistic psychology as an inalienable right for every person, summarized in the following sentence:

Every human being, with no exception, for the mere fact to be it, is worthy of unconditional respect of everybody else; he deserves to esteem himself and to be esteemed.

== Measurement ==
Self-esteem is typically assessed using self-report inventories.

One of the most widely used instruments, the Rosenberg self-esteem scale (RSES) is a 10-item self-esteem scale score that requires participants to indicate their level of agreement with a series of statements about themselves. An alternative measure, the Coopersmith Inventory uses a 50-question battery over a variety of topics and asks subjects whether they rate someone as similar or dissimilar to themselves. If a subject's answers demonstrate solid self-regard, the scale regards them as well adjusted. If those answers reveal some inner shame, it considers them to be prone to social deviance.

Implicit measures of self-esteem began to be used in the 1980s. These rely on indirect measures of cognitive processing thought to be linked to implicit self-esteem, including the name letter task (or initial preference task) and the Implicit Association Task.

Such indirect measures are designed to reduce awareness of the process of assessment. When using them to assess implicit self-esteem, psychologists apply self-relevant stimuli to the participant and then measure how quickly a person identifies positive or negative stimuli. For example, if a woman was given the self-relevant stimuli of female and mother, psychologists would measure how quickly she identified the negative word, evil, or the positive word, kind.

== Development across lifespan ==
Experiences in a person's life are a major source of how self-esteem develops. In the early years of a child's life, parents have a significant influence on self-esteem and can be considered the main source of positive and negative experiences a child will have. Unconditional love from parents helps a child develop a stable sense of being cared for and respected. These feelings translate into later effects on self-esteem as the child grows older. Students in elementary school who have high self-esteem tend to have authoritative parents who are caring, supportive adults who set clear standards for their child and allow them to voice their opinion in decision making.

Although studies thus far have reported only a correlation of warm, supportive parenting styles (mainly authoritative and permissive) with children having high self-esteem, these parenting styles could easily be thought of as having some causal effect in self-esteem development. Childhood experiences that contribute to healthy self-esteem include being listened to, being spoken to respectfully, receiving appropriate attention and affection and having accomplishments recognized and mistakes or failures acknowledged and accepted. Experiences that contribute to low self-esteem include being harshly criticized, being physically, emotionally, or sexually abused, being ignored, ridiculed, or teased, or being expected to be "perfect" all the time.

During school-aged years, academic achievement is a significant contributor to self-esteem development. Consistently achieving success or consistently failing will have a strong effect on students' individual self-esteem. However, students can also experience low self-esteem while in school. For example, they may not have academic achievements, or they live in a troubled environment outside of school. These issues can cause adolescents to doubt themselves.

Social experiences are another important contributor to self-esteem. As children go through school, they begin to understand and recognize differences between themselves and their classmates. Using social comparisons, children assess whether they did better or worse than classmates in different activities. These comparisons help shape the child's self-esteem and influence the positive or negative feelings they have about themselves. As children go through adolescence, peer influence becomes much more important. Adolescents make appraisals of themselves based on their relationships with close friends. Successful relationships among friends are very important to the development of high self-esteem for children. Social acceptance brings about confidence and produces high self-esteem, whereas rejection from peers and loneliness brings about self-doubts and produces low self-esteem.

Self-esteem tends to increase during adolescence and young adulthood, reaching a peak in middle age. A decrease is seen from middle age to old age with varying findings on whether it is a small or large decrease. Reasons for the variability could be because of differences in health, cognitive ability, and socioeconomic status in old age. No differences have been found between males and females in their development of self-esteem. Multiple cohort studies show that there is not a difference in the life-span trajectory of self-esteem between generations due to societal changes such as grade inflation in education or the presence of social media.

High levels of mastery, low risk-taking, and better health are ways to predict higher self-esteem. In terms of personality, emotionally stable, extroverted, and conscientious individuals experience higher self-esteem. These predictors have shown that self-esteem has trait-like qualities by remaining stable over time like personality and intelligence. However, this does not mean it cannot be changed.

Hispanic adolescents have a slightly lower self-esteem than their black and white peers, but then slightly higher levels by age 30. African Americans have a sharper increase in self-esteem in adolescence and young adulthood compared to Whites. However, during old age, they experience a more rapid decline in self-esteem.

=== Shame ===
Shame can be a contributor to those with problems of low self-esteem. Feelings of shame usually occur because of a situation where the social self is devalued, such as a socially evaluated poor performance. Poor performance leads to a decrease in social self-esteem and an increase in shame, indicating a threat to the social self. This increase in shame can be helped with self-compassion.

=== Real self, ideal self, and dreaded self ===
There are three levels of self-evaluation development in relation to the real self, ideal self, and the dreaded self. The real, ideal, and dreaded selves develop in children in a sequential pattern on cognitive levels.

- Moral judgment stages: Individuals describe their real, ideal, and dreaded selves with stereotypical labels, such as "nice" or "bad". Individuals describe their ideal and real selves in terms of disposition for actions or as behavioral habits. The dreaded self is often described as being unsuccessful or as having bad habits.
- Ego development stages: Individuals describe their ideal and real selves in terms of traits that are based on attitudes as well as actions. The dreaded self is often described as having failed to meet social expectations or as self-centered.
- Self-understanding stages: Individuals describe their ideal and real selves as having unified identities or characters. Descriptions of the dreaded self focus on failure to live up to one's ideals or role expectations often because of real world problems.

This development brings with it increasingly complicated and encompassing moral demands. This level is where individuals' self-esteems can suffer because they do not feel as though they are living up to certain expectations. This feeling will moderately affect one's self-esteem with an even larger effect seen when individuals believe they are becoming their dreaded selves.

== Types of self-esteems ==
=== High ===
Hierarchy of Needs (Maslow)

People with a healthy level of self-esteem:

- firmly believe in certain values and principles, and are ready to defend them even when finding opposition, feeling secure enough to modify them in light of experience
- are able to act according to what they think to be the best choice, trusting their own judgment, and not feeling guilty when others do not like their choice
- do not lose time worrying excessively about what happened in the past, nor about what could happen in the future; they learn from the past and plan for the future, but live in the present intensely
- fully trust their capacity to solve problems, not hesitating after failures and difficulties; they ask others for help when they need it
- consider themselves equal in dignity to others, rather than inferior or superior, while accepting differences in certain talents, personal prestige, or financial standing
- understand how they are an interesting and valuable person for others, at least for those with whom they have a friendship
- resist manipulation, collaborate with others only if it seems appropriate and convenient
- admit and accept different internal feelings and drives, either positive or negative, revealing those drives to others only when they choose
- are able to enjoy a great variety of activities
- are sensitive to feelings and needs of others; respect generally accepted social rules, and claim no right or desire to prosper at others' expense
- can work toward finding solutions and voice discontent without belittling themselves or others when challenges arise

=== Secure vs. defensive ===
Some people have a secure high self-esteem and can confidently maintain positive self-views without relying on external reassurance. However, others have defensive high self-esteem, and while they also report positive self-views on the Rosenberg Scale, these views are fragile and easily threatened by criticism. Defensive high self-esteem individuals internalize subconscious self-doubts and insecurities, causing them to react very negatively to any criticism they may receive. There is a need for constant positive feedback from others for these individuals to maintain their feelings of self-worth. The necessity of repeated praise can be associated with boastful, arrogant behavior or sometimes even aggressive and hostile feelings toward anyone who questions the individual's self-worth, an example of threatened egotism.

The Journal of Educational Psychology conducted a study in which they used a sample of 383 Malaysian undergraduates participating in work integrated learning (WIL) programs across five public universities to test the relationship between self-esteem and other psychological attributes such as self-efficacy and self-confidence. The results demonstrated that self-esteem has a positive and significant relationship with self-confidence and self-efficacy since students with higher self-esteem had better performances at university than those with lower self-esteem. It was concluded that higher education institutions and employers should emphasize the importance of undergraduates' self-esteem development.

=== Implicit and explicit ===
Implicit self-esteem refers to a person's disposition to evaluate themselves positively or negatively in a spontaneous, automatic, or unconscious manner. It contrasts with explicit self-esteem, which entails more conscious and reflective self-evaluation. Both explicit self-esteem and implicit self-esteem are theoretically subtypes of self-esteem proper.

However, the validity of implicit self-esteem as a construct is highly questionable, given not only its weak or nonexistent correlation with explicit self-esteem and informant ratings of self-esteem, but also the failure of multiple measures of implicit self-esteem to correlate with each other.

Currently, there is little scientific evidence that self-esteem can be reliably or validly measured through implicit means.

=== Narcissism and threatened egotism ===
Narcissism is a disposition people may have that represents an excessive love for one's self. It is characterized by an inflated view of self-worth. Individuals who score high on narcissism measures, Robert Raskin's Narcissistic Personality Inventory, would likely respond "true" to such prompt statements as "If I ruled the world, it would be a much better place." There is only a moderate correlation between narcissism and self-esteem; that is to say that an individual can have high self-esteem but low narcissism or can score high self-esteem and high narcissism. However, when correlation analysis is restricted to the sense of superiority or self-admiration aspects of narcissism, correlations between narcissism and self-esteem become strong. Moreover, self-esteem is positively correlated with a sense of superiority even when controlling for overall narcissism.

Narcissism is not only defined by inflated self-esteem, but also by characteristics such as entitlement, exploitativeness, and dominance. Additionally, while positive self-image is a shared characteristic of narcissism and self-esteem, narcissistic self-appraisals are exaggerated, whereas in non-narcissistic self-esteem, positive views of the self compared with others are relatively modest. Thus, while sharing positive self-regard as a main feature, and while narcissism is defined by high self-esteem, the two constructs are not interchangeable.

Threatened egotism is a phenomenon in which narcissists respond to criticism with hostility and aggression, as it threatens their sense of self-worth.

=== Low ===
Low self-esteem can result from various factors, including genetic factors, physical appearance or weight, mental health issues, socioeconomic status, significant emotional experiences, social stigma, peer pressure, or bullying. A person with low self-esteem may show some of the following characteristics:

- heavy self-criticism and dissatisfaction
- hypersensitivity to criticism with resentment against critics and feelings of being attacked
- chronic indecision and an exaggerated fear of mistakes
- excessive will to please and unwillingness to displease any petitioner
- perfectionism, which can lead to frustration when perfection is not achieved
- neurotic guilt, dwelling on or exaggerating the magnitude of past mistakes
- floating hostility and general defensiveness and irritability without any proximate cause
- pessimism and a general negative outlook
- envy, invidiousness, or general resentment
- sees temporary setbacks as permanent, intolerable conditions

Individuals with low self-esteem tend to be critical of themselves. Some depend on the approval and praise of others when evaluating self-worth. Others may measure their likability in terms of successes; they will accept themselves if they succeed but will not if they fail. People with chronic low self esteem are at a higher risk for experiencing psychotic disorders; and this behavior is closely linked to forming psychotic symptoms as well.

Metacognitive therapy, EMDR technique, mindfulness-based cognitive therapy, rational emotive behavior therapy, cognitive behavioral therapy and trait and construct therapies have been shown to improve the patient's self-esteem.

=== The three states ===
This classification proposed by Martin Ross distinguishes three states of self-esteem compared to the "feats" (triumphs, honors, virtues) and the "anti-feats" (defeats, embarrassment, shame, etc.) of the individuals.

==== Shattered ====
The individual does not regard themselves as valuable or lovable. They may be overwhelmed by defeat, or shame, or see themselves as such, and they name their "anti-feat". For example, if they consider that being over a certain age is an anti-feat, they define themselves with the name of their anti-feat, and say, "I am old". They express actions and feelings such as pity, insulting themselves, and they may become paralyzed by their sadness.

==== Vulnerable ====
The individual has a generally positive self-image. However, their self-esteem is also vulnerable to the perceived risk of an imminent anti-feat (such as defeat, embarrassment, shame, discredit), consequently, they are often nervous and regularly use defense mechanisms. A typical protection mechanism of those with vulnerable self-esteem may consist in avoiding decision-making. Although such individuals may outwardly exhibit great self-confidence, the underlying reality may be just the opposite: the apparent self-confidence is indicative of their heightened fear of anti-feats and the fragility of their self-esteem. They may also try to blame others to protect their self-image from situations that would threaten it. They may employ defense mechanisms, including attempting to lose at games and other competitions in order to protect their self-image by publicly dissociating themselves from a need to win, and asserting an independence from social acceptance which they may deeply desire. In this deep fear of being unaccepted by an individual's peers, they make poor life choices by making risky decisions.

==== Strong ====
People with strong self-esteem have a positive self-image and enough strength so that anti-feats do not subdue their self-esteem. They have less fear of failure. These individuals appear humble, cheerful, and this shows a certain strength not to boast about feats and not to be afraid of anti-feats. They are capable of fighting with all their might to achieve their goals because, if things go wrong, their self-esteem will not be affected. They can acknowledge their own mistakes precisely because their self-image is strong, and this acknowledgment will not impair or affect their self-image. They live with less fear of losing social prestige, and with more happiness and general well-being. However, no type of self-esteem is indestructible, and due to certain situations or circumstances in life, one can fall from this level into any other state of self-esteem.

=== Contingent vs. non-contingent ===
"The courage to be is the courage to accept oneself, in spite of being unacceptable.... This is the Pauline-Lutheran doctrine of 'justification by faith.'" Paul Tillich

A distinction is made between contingent (or conditional) and non-contingent (or unconditional) self-esteem.

Contingent self-esteem is derived from external sources, such as what others say, one's success or failure, one's competence, or relationship-contingent self-esteem. Therefore, contingent self-esteem is marked by instability, unreliability, and vulnerability. Persons lacking a non-contingent self-esteem are "predisposed to an incessant pursuit of self-value". However, because the pursuit of contingent self-esteem is based on receiving approval, it is doomed to fail, as no one receives constant approval, and disapproval often evokes depression. Furthermore, fear of disapproval inhibits activities in which failure is possible.

Non-contingent self-esteem is described as true, stable, and solid. It springs from a belief that one is "acceptable period, acceptable before life itself, ontologically acceptable". Belief that one is "ontologically acceptable" is to believe that one's acceptability is "the way things are without contingency". In this belief, as expounded by theologian Paul Tillich, acceptability is not based on a person's virtue. It is an acceptance given "in spite of our guilt, not because we have no guilt". Psychiatrist Thomas A Harris drew on Tillich for his classic I'm OK – You're OK that addresses non-contingent self-esteem. Harris translated Tillich's "acceptable" by the vernacular OK, a term that means "acceptable". The Christian message, said Harris, is not "YOU CAN BE OK, IF"; it is "YOU ARE ACCEPTED, unconditionally". A secure non-contingent self-esteem springs from the belief that one is ontologically acceptable and accepted.

=== Domain-specific self-esteem ===
Whereas global self-esteem addresses how individuals appraise themselves in their entirety, domain-specific self-esteem facets relate to how they appraise themselves in various pertinent domains of life. Such functionally distinct facets of self-esteem may comprise self-evaluations in social, emotional, body-related, school performance-related, and creative-artistic domains.

They have been found to be predictive of outcomes related to psychological functioning, health, education, and work. Low self-esteem in the social domain (i.e., self-perceived social competence), for example, has been repeatedly identified as a risk factor for bullying victimization.

== Importance ==
Abraham Maslow states that psychological health is not possible unless the essential core of the person is fundamentally accepted, loved and respected by others and by oneself. Self-esteem allows people to face life with more confidence, benevolence, and optimism, and thus easily reach their goals and self-actualize.

Self-esteem may make people convinced they deserve happiness. The ability to understand and develop positive self-esteem is essential for building healthy relationships with others. When people have a positive view of themselves, they are more likely to treat others with respect, compassion, and kindness. This creates the foundation for strong, positive relationships that are built on mutual respect and understanding. For Erich Fromm, the love of others and love of ourselves are not alternatives. On the contrary, an attitude of love toward themselves will be found in all those who are capable of loving others. Self-esteem allows creativity at the workplace and is a specially critical condition for teaching professions.

José-Vicente Bonet claims that the importance of self-esteem is obvious as a lack of self-esteem is, he says, not a loss of esteem from others, but self-rejection. Bonet claims that this corresponds to major depressive disorder. Freud also claimed that the depressive has suffered "an extraordinary diminution in his self-regard, an impoverishment of his ego on a grand scale... He has lost his self-respect".

The Yogyakarta Principles, a document on international human rights law, addresses the discriminatory attitude toward LGBT people that makes their self-esteem low to be subject to human rights violation including human trafficking. The World Health Organization recommends in "Preventing Suicide", published in 2000, that strengthening students' self-esteem is important to protect children and adolescents against mental distress and despondency, enabling them to cope adequately with difficult and stressful life situations.

Not only does higher self-esteem increase happiness, but it is also associated with improved stress coping and increased willingness to take on challenging tasks. In contrast, a study examined the impact of boosting self-esteem. It found that high self-esteem does offer some benefits, but they are limited. It is often a result, rather than a cause, of success. The researchers also found that efforts to boost self-esteem may not consistently lead to improved performance, and that self-esteem's influence on life outcomes is modest, except for a temporary increase in positive self-image awareness.

=== Correlations ===
From the late 1970s to the early 1990s many Americans assumed as a matter of course that students' self-esteem acted as a critical factor in the grades that they earned in school, in their relationships with their peers, and in their later success in life. Under this assumption, some American groups created programs which aimed to increase the self-esteem of students. Until the 1990s, little peer-reviewed and controlled research took place on this topic.

Peer-reviewed research undertaken since then has not validated previous assumptions. Recent research indicates that inflating students' self-esteems in and of itself has no positive effect on grades. Roy Baumeister has shown that inflating self-esteem by itself can actually decrease grades. The relationship involving self-esteem and academic results does not signify that high self-esteem contributes to high academic results. It simply means that high self-esteem may be accomplished as a result of high academic performance due to the other variables of social interactions and life events affecting this performance.

Attempts by proponents of self-esteem programs to encourage self-pride in students solely by reason of their uniqueness as human beings are likely to fail if feelings of well-being are not accompanied by achievement. It is only when students engage in personally meaningful endeavors for which they can be proud that self-confidence grows, and it is this growing self-assurance that in turn leads to further achievement.

Research has found a strong correlation between high self-esteem and self-reported happiness, but it is not yet known whether this relationship is causal. This means that although people with high self-esteem tend to report greater happiness, it is not certain whether having high self-esteem directly causes increased happiness. The relationship between self-esteem and life satisfaction is stronger in individualistic cultures.

In addition, people with high self-esteem have been found to be more forgiving than people with low self-esteem. This is because people with high self-esteem tend to have greater self-acceptance and are more likely to view conflict in a positive light, as an opportunity for growth and improvement. In contrast, people with low self-esteem may have a harder time forgiving others, due to a sense of insecurity and self-doubt.

High self-esteem does not prevent children from smoking, drinking, taking drugs, or engaging in early sex.

=== Mental health ===
Self-esteem has been associated with several mental health conditions, including depression, anxiety, and eating disorders. For example, low self-esteem may increase the likelihood that people who experience dysfunctional thoughts will develop symptoms of depression. Consequently, cognitive treatment of depression helps with low self-esteem, and vice versa, addressing low self-esteem improves depressive symptoms. In contrast, high self-esteem may protect against the development of mental health conditions, with research finding that high self-esteem reduces the chances of bulimia and anxiety.

== Neuroscience ==
In research conducted in 2014 by Robert S. Chavez and Todd F. Heatherton, it was found that self-esteem is related to the connectivity of the frontostriatal circuit. The frontostriatal pathway connects the medial prefrontal cortex, which deals with self-knowledge, to the ventral striatum, which deals with feelings of motivation and reward. Stronger anatomical pathways are correlated with higher long-term self-esteem, while stronger functional connectivity is correlated with higher short-term self-esteem.

== Criticism and controversy ==
Albert Ellis, an influential American psychologist, argued that the concept of self-esteem is actually harmful and unhelpful. Although acknowledging the human propensity and tendency to ego rating as innate, he has critiqued the philosophy of self-esteem as unrealistic, illogical and self- and socially destructive – often doing more harm than good. Questioning the foundations and usefulness of generalized ego strength, he has claimed that self-esteem is based on arbitrary definitional premises, and overgeneralized, perfectionistic and grandiose thinking. Acknowledging that rating and valuing behaviors and characteristics is functional and even necessary, he sees rating and valuing human beings' totality and total selves as irrational and unethical. The healthier alternative to self-esteem according to him is unconditional self-acceptance and unconditional other-acceptance. Rational Emotive Behavior Therapy is a psychotherapy based on this approach.

"There seem to be only two clearly demonstrated benefits of high self-esteem....First, it increases initiative, probably because it lends confidence. People with high self-esteem are more willing to act on their beliefs, to stand up for what they believe in, to approach others, to risk new undertakings. (This unfortunately includes being extra willing to do stupid or destructive things, even when everyone else advises against them.)...It can also lead people to ignore sensible advice as they stubbornly keep wasting time and money on hopeless causes"

=== False attempts ===
For persons with low self-esteem, any positive stimulus will temporarily raise self-esteem. Therefore, possessions, sex, success, or physical appearance will produce the development of self-esteem, but the development is ephemeral at best. Such attempts to raise one's self-esteem by positive stimulus produce a "boom or bust" pattern. "Compliments and positive feedback" produce a boost, but a bust follows a lack of such feedback. For a person whose "self-esteem is contingent", success is "not extra sweet", but "failure is extra bitter".

=== As narcissism ===
Life satisfaction, happiness, healthy behavioral practices, perceived efficacy, and academic success and adjustment have been associated with having high levels of self-esteem However, a common mistake is to think that loving oneself is necessarily equivalent to narcissism, as opposed for example to what Erik Erikson speaks of as "a post-narcissistic love of the ego". People with healthy self-esteem accept and love themselves unconditionally, acknowledging both virtues and faults in the self, and yet, in spite of everything, are able to continue to love themselves. In narcissists, by contrast, an "uncertainty about their own worth gives rise to...a self-protective, but often totally spurious, aura of grandiosity" – producing the class "of narcissists, or people with very high, but insecure, self-esteem... fluctuating with each new episode of social praise or rejection." For narcissists, regulating their self-esteem is their constant concern. They use defenses (such as denial, projection, self-inflation, envy, arrogance, and aggression), impression management through self-promotion, embellishment, lying, charm, and domination, and prefer high-status, competitive, and hierarchical environments to support their unstable, fragile, and impaired self-esteem.

Narcissism can thus be seen as a symptom of fundamentally low self-esteem, that is, lack of love towards oneself, but often accompanied by "an immense increase in self-esteem" based on "the defense mechanism of denial by overcompensation." "Idealized love of self...rejected the part of him" that he denigrates – "this destructive little child" within. Instead, the narcissist emphasizes their virtues in the presence of others, just to try to convince themself that they are a valuable person and to try to stop feeling ashamed for their faults; such "people with unrealistically inflated self-views, which may be especially unstable and highly vulnerable to negative information,...tend to have poor social skills."

== Self-esteem in cancer patients ==
Cancer is one of the most significant health problems worldwide. It is a chronic and psychosocially devastating disease that can cause pain, evoke thoughts of death, and cause feelings of guilt, anxiety, and confusion. Self-esteem is considered an important psychological resource that is associated with many health behaviors and human well-being. Cancer and its treatment can cause some major negative changes that can disrupt social self-perceptions due to "sick" status, body image as a result from scars, alopecia, sexual problems, and self-efficacy including fatigue and handicaps.

The study "Self at Risk: Self-Esteem and Quality of Life in Cancer Patients Undergoing Surgical Treatment and Experiencing Bodily Deformities" discussed that quality of life and self-esteem of patients in both Study 1, oral cancer and Study 2, breast cancer deteriorated after surgery. Self-esteem is an important factor in determining quality of life after surgical procedures that lead to bodily deformities associated with cancer treatment. The largest decreases in various dimensions of Quality of life and explicit self-esteem were observed in women with fragile self-esteem. This group is at risk of the greatest deterioration in Quality of life and self-image after cancer surgery and should receive special psycho-oncological care.

Physical damage related to cancer treatment can lead to changes in body image, which is associated with a decrease in self-esteem. For example, breast cancer patients who had a mastectomy showed significantly lower self-esteem than those with breast-conserving surgery. A drop in self-esteem was observed during chemotherapy-induced alopecia, which persisted even after hair regrowth. The impact of cancer on self-esteem is thought to be greater in younger adults.

Age-related variables like marital/employment status and long-term consequences such as fertility problems or sexual dysfunction can affect the sense of virility/femininity and family plans, especially in young patients. The study suggests that considering self-esteem is necessary in oncology care due to its association with coping and social support and its role in preventing depression. Early identification of patients most at risk of decreased self-esteem, particularly young adults and those with significant physical damage, is recommended.

Interventions targeting self-perceptions could have preventive effects by promoting psychological adjustment, adaptive coping, and maintaining social support, ultimately reducing the risk of depressive disorders. Cancer patients with high, fragile self-esteem require special psycho-oncological care. Therapeutic approaches aimed at strengthening implicit self-esteem and managing neurotic mechanisms are suggested. Techniques such as focusing on patient strengths, enhancing agency, mindfulness, and thought diffusion are recommended as interventions to help protect self-esteem, especially in the preoperative period.

=== Self-esteem in prostate cancer patients ===
Body image, self-esteem, and masculinity are tightly linked, and their effects on men are often experienced together, such as the relationship between erectile dysfunction, masculinity, and self-esteem. The most important threat was the inevitable change to sexual function and libido. Men felt they had "lost a bit of [their] manhood" and compared radical prostatectomy to being "gelded" or castrated. Androgen Deprivation Therapy (ADT) side effects, like emotional changes and gynecomastia ("gaining boobs"), made men feel "like honorary women" or that they were "being turned into women".

Physical changes such as fatigue, urinary incontinence, and changes to appearance led men to perceive their bodies as deficient and a source of shame. Even without major functional changes, the removal of the prostate made men feel their body was less than whole. Men experienced profound embarrassment due to their inability to perform sexually and sometimes retreated from social situations. They often felt they lacked a sick role because their illness didn't fit the traditional "sick" model, increasing their shame to admit their illness. Men re-asserted their masculinity through other life areas, particularly through gaining control. Many men considered the loss of sexual functioning acceptable as a necessary measure to preserve their health and prolong life. Humor was used as a coping mechanism to draw attention away from sensitive topics and minimize the emotional burden of the disease. Ultimately, many reached acceptance, realizing that physical and sexual changes did not change the fact that they were "still a man". Some found a renewed sense of confidence by becoming mentors or serving as spokespersons for PCa survivors, re-aligning with masculine ideals of strength and leadership.

== In popular media ==
The Offspring dedicated a song to the concept of self-esteem.

== See also ==
- Assertiveness
- Body image
- Clinical depression
- Dunning–Kruger effect
- Emotional competence
- Fear of negative evaluation
- Gumption trap
- Health-related embarrassment
- Hubris
- Inner critic
- Invisible support
- Law of Jante
- Optimism bias
- Outline of self
- Overconfidence effect
- Passiveness
- Self-affirmation
- Self-enhancement
- Self-esteem functions
- Self-esteem instability
- Shyness
- Social phobia
