= National Association for Self-Esteem =

American advocacy organization

The National Association for Self-Esteem (NASE) is an American organization devoted to promoting the importance of self-esteem. The organization describes its purpose as "to fully integrate self-esteem into the fabric of American society so that every individual, no matter what their age or background, experiences personal worth and happiness." It was founded in 1986 as the National Council for Self-Esteem.

== History ==
In 1986, with sponsorship by State Assemblyman John Vasconcellos, the state of California created the California Task Force to Promote Self-Esteem and Personal and Social Responsibility. The Task Force completed a report and was subsequently disbanded, but the creation of the National Council for Self-Esteem was motivated by its work.

== Organization and membership ==
NASE is organized into chapters. At one time the organization had 66 chapters in 29 different states.

Members over the years have included:

- Nathaniel Branden
- Virginia Satir
- Gloria Steinem
- Sean Stephenson
- Denis Waitley
