= Rosenberg self-esteem scale =

Self-report questionnaire

The Rosenberg self-esteem scale (RSES), developed by the sociologist Morris Rosenberg, is a self-esteem measure widely used in social science research. It uses a scale of 0–30, where a score less than 15 may indicate problematic low self-esteem. Although the instrument was developed for use with adolescents, it has been widely used in research on adults.

The RSES is designed similar to the social-survey questionnaires. Five of the items have positively worded statements and five have negatively worded ones. The scale measures global self-worth by measuring both positive and negative feelings about the self. The original sample for which the scale was developed consisted of 5,024 high-school juniors and seniors from 10 randomly selected schools in New York State. The Rosenberg self-esteem scale is considered a reliable and valid quantitative tool for self-esteem assessment.

The RSES has been translated and adapted to various languages, such as Persian, French, Chinese, Italian, German, Portuguese, and Spanish. The scale is extensively used in cross-cultural studies in up to 53 different nations.

== See also ==
- Psychological testing
