= List of phobias =

List of fears of different things or objects

The English suffixes -phobia, -phobic, -phobe (from Greek φόβος phobos, 'fear') occur in technical usage in psychiatry to construct words that describe irrational, abnormal, unwarranted, persistent, or disabling fear as a mental disorder (e.g., agoraphobia), in chemistry to describe chemical aversions (e.g., hydrophobic), in biology to describe organisms that dislike certain conditions (e.g., acidophobia), and in medicine to describe hypersensitivity to a stimulus, usually sensory (e.g., photophobia). In common usage, they also form words that describe dislike or hatred of a particular thing or subject (e.g., homophobia). The suffix is antonymic to -phil-.

For more information on the psychiatric side, including how psychiatry groups phobias such as agoraphobia, social phobia, or simple phobia, see phobia. The following lists include words ending in -phobia, and include fears that have acquired names. In some cases, the naming of phobias has become a word game, a notable example being a 1998 humorous article published by BBC News. In some cases, a word ending in -phobia may have an antonym with the suffix -phil-, e.g., Germanophobe/Germanophile.

Many -phobia lists circulate on the Internet, with words collected from indiscriminate sources, often copying each other. Also, a number of psychiatric websites exist that at the first glance cover a huge number of phobias, but in fact use a standard text to fit any phobia and reuse it for all unusual phobias by merely changing the name. Sometimes it leads to bizarre results, such as suggestions to cure "prostitute phobia". Such practice is known as content spamming and is used to attract search engines.

An article published in 1897 in the American Journal of Psychology noted, "the absurd tendency to give Greek names to objects feared (which, as Arndt says, would give us such terms as klopsophobia – fear of thieves and triakaidekaphobia [sic] – fear of the number 13 ...)".

== Psychological conditions ==
Specialists may prefer to avoid the suffix -phobia and use more descriptive terms such as personality disorders, anxiety disorders, and avoidant personality disorder. Terms should strictly have a Greek prefix, although many are irregularly formed with Latin or even English prefixes. Many use inaccurate or imprecise prefixes, such as aerophobia (fear of air) for fear of flying.

=== A ===
Phobia	Condition
Achluophobia	fear of darkness
Acousticophobia	fear of noise – a branch of phonophobia
Acrophobia	fear of heights
Aerophobia (Note: Also known as aviophobia.)	fear of aircraft or flying
Agoraphobia	fear of certain inescapable/unsafe situations
Agyrophobia	fear of crossing streets
Aichmophobia	fear of sharp or pointed objects such as needles, pins or knives
Ailurophobia	fear/dislike of cats, a zoophobia
Alektorophobia	fear/dislike of chickens, a zoophobia
Algophobia	fear of pain
Ancraophobia	fear of wind or drafts
Androphobia	fear of adult men
Anthropophobia	fear of human beings
Apeirophobia	excessive fear of infinity, eternity, and the uncountable
Aphenphosmphobia	fear of being touched
Apiphobia	fear of bees, a zoophobia
Apotemnophobia	fear of amputees or of becoming an amputee
Aquaphobia	fear of water. Distinct from hydrophobia, a scientific property that makes chemicals averse to interaction with water, as well as an archaic name for rabies.
Arachnophobia	fear of spiders and other arachnids such as scorpions, a zoophobia
Astraphobia	fear of thunder and lightning
Atelophobia	fear of imperfection; a synonym of perfectionism
Athazagoraphobia	fear of forgetting, forgetfulness or being forgotten
Atychiphobia	fear of failure or negative evaluations by others
Autophobia	fear of isolation

=== B ===
Phobia	Condition
Bacteriophobia	fear of bacteria
Basophobia, basiphobia	fear of falling, fear associated with astasia-abasia, or fear of walking/standing erect
Bathmophobia	fear of using stairs
Batrachophobia	fear/dislike of frogs and other amphibians, a zoophobia
Belonephobia	fear of needles or pins
Bibliophobia	fear of books
Blood-injection-injury type phobia	a DSM-IV subtype of specific phobias

=== C ===
Phobia	Condition
Cacophobia, aschimophobia	fear of ugliness
Carcinophobia	fear of cancer
Catoptrophobia	fear of mirrors
Cephalalgiaphobia	fear of headaches
Chemophobia	fear of chemicals
Cherophobia	fear of happiness
Chionophobia	fear of snow
Chromophobia, chromatophobia	fear of colors
Chronophobia	fear of time and time moving forward
Cibophobia, sitophobia	aversion to food, synonymous with anorexia nervosa
Claustrophobia	fear of having no escape and being closed in
Coprophobia	fear of feces or defecation
Coulrophobia	fear of clowns
Cyberphobia	fear of computers
Cynophobia	fear/dislike of dogs, a zoophobia

=== D ===
Phobia	Condition
Dendrophobia	fear of trees
Dental fear, odontophobia	fear of dentists and dental procedures
Dentophobia	fear of dentists
Domatophobia	fear of houses
Driving phobia, driving anxiety	fear of driving
Body dysmorphic disorder, dysmorphophobia	a phobic obsession with a real or imaginary body defect
Dystichiphobia	fear of being involved in an accident

=== E ===
Phobia	Condition
Ecophobia	fear of cataclysmic environmental change
Eisoptrophobia	fear of mirrors or seeing one's reflection in a mirror, also called spectrophobia or catoptrophobia
Emetophobia	fear of vomiting
Enochlophobia	fear of crowds
Entomophobia	fear/dislike of insects, a zoophobia
Ephebiphobia	fear of youth; inaccurate, exaggerated and sensational characterization of young people
Equinophobia	fear of horses, a zoophobia
Ergophobia, ergasiophobia	fear of work or functioning, or a surgeon's fear of operating
Erotophobia	fear of sexual love or sexual abuse
Eurotophobia	aversion to female genitals

=== F ===
Phobia	Condition
Frigophobia	fear of becoming too cold

=== G ===
Phobia	Condition
Galeophobia	fear of sharks
Gamophobia	fear of marriage
Gelotophobia	fear of being laughed at
Gephyrophobia	fear of bridges
Genophobia, coitophobia	fear of sexual intercourse
Genuphobia	fear of knees or the act of kneeling
Gerascophobia	fear of growing old or aging
Gerontophobia	fear of growing old, or a hatred or fear of the elderly
Globophobia	fear of balloons
Glossophobia	fear of speaking in public or of trying to speak
Gymnophobia	fear of nudity
Gynophobia	fear of adult women

=== H ===
Phobia	Condition
Halitophobia	fear of bad breath
Haphephobia	fear of being touched
Heptadekaphobia, heptadecaphobia	fear of the number 17
Hedonophobia	fear of obtaining pleasure
Heliophobia	fear of the sun or sunlight
Vermiphobia, helminthophobia, scoleciphobia	fear of worms or parasitic worms, a zoophobia
Hemophobia, haemophobia	fear of blood
Herpetophobia	fear/dislike of reptiles or amphibians, a zoophobia
Hexakosioihexekontahexaphobia	fear of the number 666
Hippophobia	fear/dislike of horses, a zoophobia
Hodophobia	fear of travel
Hypnophobia, somniphobia	fear of sleep or nightmares
Hypochondria	fear of illness

=== I ===
Phobia	Condition
Ichthyophobia	fear of fish, including fear of eating fish, or fear of dead fish, a zoophobia
Insectophobia	fear of insects, a zoophobia

=== K ===
Phobia	Condition
Katsaridaphobia	fear of cockroaches, a zoophobia
Kinesiophobia	fear of movement
Koumpounophobia	fear of buttons on clothing

=== L ===
Phobia	Condition
Lilapsophobia	fear of tornadoes or hurricanes
Lepidopterophobia	fear of butterflies and moths, a zoophobia

=== M ===
Phobia	Condition
Mageirocophobia	fear of cooking
Masklophobia	fear of people in masks, costumes and mascots
Megalophobia	fear of massive objects
Melissophobia, apiphobia	fear/dislike of bees, a zoophobia
Monophobia	fear of being alone or isolated or of one's self
Musophobia, murophobia, suriphobia	fear/dislike of mice or rats, a zoophobia
Mycophobia	fear of mushrooms
Myrmecophobia	fear of ants, a zoophobia
Mysophobia, germophobia	fear of germs, contamination or dirt

=== N ===
Phobia	Condition
Necrophobia	fear of corpses or things associated with death (not to be confused with death anxiety)
Neophobia, cainophobia, cainotophobia, centophobia, kainolophobia, kainophobia, metathesiophobia, prosophobia	fear of newness, novelty, change or progress
Noctiphobia	fear of the night
Nomophobia	fear of being out of mobile phone contact
Nosocomephobia	fear of hospitals
Nosophobia	fear of contracting a disease
Numerophobia	fear of numbers
Nyctophobia, achluophobia, lygophobia, scotophobia	fear of darkness

=== O ===
Phobia	Condition
Odontophobia	dental fear
Ommetaphobia	fear of eyes
Oneirophobia	fear of dreams
Ophidiophobia	fear/dislike of snakes, a zoophobia
Ophthalmophobia, spotligectophobia, scopophobia, scoptophobia	fear of being stared at
Ornithophobia	fear/dislike of birds, a zoophobia
Osmophobia, olfactophobia	fear of odors
Ostraconophobia	fear/dislike of shellfish, a zoophobia
Octophobia	fear of the number 8

=== P ===
Phobia	Condition
Panphobia	fear of everything or constant generalised fear of an unknown cause
Pedophobia, paedophobia, pediaphobia	fear of babies and children
Phagophobia	fear of swallowing
Phallophobia	fear of erections or penises
Pharmacophobia	fear of medications
Phasmophobia	fear of ghosts or phantoms
Philophobia	fear of love
Phyllophobia	fear of leaves
Phobophobia	fear of fear itself or of having a phobia
Phonophobia	fear of loud sounds or voices
Pogonophobia	fear of beards
Pornophobia	dislike or fear of pornography; may be used in reference to the opposition to visual nudity
Porphyrophobia	fear of the color purple, a chromophobia
Pteromerhanophobia	fear of flying
Pyrophobia	fear of fire

=== R ===
Phobia	Condition
Radiophobia	fear of radioactivity or X-rays
Ranidaphobia	fear/dislike of frogs, a zoophobia

=== S ===
Phobia	Condition
Scopophobia, scoptophobia, ophthalmophobia, spotligectophobia	fear of being looked at or stared at
Sexophobia	fear of sexual organs or sexual activities
Siderodromophobia	fear of trains or railroads
Social phobia	fear of people or social situations
Spectrophobia	fear of mirrors
Spheksophobia	fear of wasps, a zoophobia
Stasiphobia	fear of standing or walking
Submechanophobia	fear of partially or fully submerged man-made objects

=== T ===
Phobia	Condition
Taphophobia, taphephobia	fear of graves, or fear of being placed in a grave while still alive
Technophobia	fear of advanced technology (see also Luddite)
Telephone phobia	fear or reluctance of making or taking telephone calls
Teratophobia	fear of giving birth to a monster or a disfigured foetus
Tetraphobia	fear of the number 4
Thalassophobia	fear of the sea, or fear of being in the ocean
Thanatophobia	fear of dying, a synonym of death anxiety; not to be confused with necrophobia
Thermophobia	fear of intolerance to high temperatures
Tokophobia	fear of childbirth or pregnancy
Tomophobia	fear of invasive medical procedures
Tonitrophobia	fear of thunder
Toxiphobia, toxophobia, iophobia	fear of being poisoned
Traumatophobia	a synonym for injury phobia: fear of having an injury
Trichophobia	delusional fear of something in the roots of the hair that stops it from growing, or fear of hair loss
Triskaidekaphobia, terdekaphobia	fear of the number 13
Trypanophobia, belonephobia, enetophobia	fear of needles or injections
Trypophobia	fear of holes or textures with a pattern of holes

=== V ===
Phobia	Condition
Vehophobia	fear of driving
Veloxrotaphobia	fear of roller coasters
Verminophobia	fear of germs

=== X ===
Phobia	Condition
Xenophobia	fear of people perceived as foreign

=== Z ===
Phobia	Condition
Zoophobia	fear of animals

== Cultural prejudices and discrimination ==
Phobia	Condition
Acephobia	fear/dislike of asexual people
Aporophobia	fear/dislike of people without financial resources
Arophobia	fear/dislike of aromantic people
Biphobia	fear/dislike of bisexual people
Ephebiphobia	fear/dislike of youth
Gayphobia	fear/dislike of gay men (specifically)
Gerontophobia	fear/dislike of aging or elderly people
Gerascophobia	fear/dislike of aging
Heterophobia	fear/dislike of heterosexual people
Homophobia	fear/dislike of homosexual people
Lesbophobia	fear/dislike of lesbians
Paedophobia	fear/dislike of babies or children
Psychophobia	fear/dislike of mental illness or mentally ill people
Transphobia	fear/dislike of transgender people

=== Ethnic/national/religious prejudices and discrimination ===
The suffix -phobia is used to coin terms that denote a particular anti-ethnic or anti-demographic sentiment, such as Americanophobia, Europhobia, Francophobia, Hispanophobia, and Indophobia. Often a synonym with the prefix "anti-" already exists (e.g. Polonophobia vs. anti-Polonism). Anti-religious sentiments are expressed in terms such as Christianophobia and Islamophobia.

Phobia	Condition
Afrophobia	fear/dislike of Africans
Albanophobia	fear/dislike of Albanians
Anglophobia	fear/dislike of England or English culture
Arabophobia	fear/dislike of Arabs
Catalanophobia	fear/dislike of Catalans, Catalonia, Catalan culture, or the Catalan language
Christianophobia	fear/dislike of Christians
Germanophobia	fear/dislike of Germans
Hibernophobia	fear/dislike of Irish people
Hinduphobia	fear/dislike of Hindus
Hispanophobia	fear/dislike of Hispanic people, Hispanic culture, or the Spanish language
Hungarophobia	fear/dislike of Hungarians
Indophobia	fear/dislike of India or Indian culture
Indonesiaphobia	fear/dislike of Indonesia or Indonesian culture
Iranophobia	fear/dislike of Iran or Iranian culture
Islamophobia	fear/dislike of Muslims
Italophobia	fear/dislike of Italians
Judeophobia	fear/dislike of Jews
Koryophobia	fear/dislike of Koreans
Kurdophobia	fear/dislike of Kurds
Latinophobia	fear/dislike of Latin people
Lusophobia	fear/dislike of Portuguese people, Portuguese culture, or the Portuguese language
Malayophobia	fear/dislike of Malays
Negrophobia	fear/dislike of Black people
Nipponophobia	fear/dislike of Japanese people
Polonophobia	fear/dislike of Polish people
Romaphobia	fear/dislike of Romani people
Russophobia	fear/dislike of Russians
Serbophobia	fear/dislike of Serbs
Shiaphobia	fear/dislike of Shiites
Sinophobia	fear/dislike of Chinese people
Theophobia	fear/dislike of God or religion
Turcophobia	fear/dislike of Turkish people
Ukrainophobia	fear/dislike of Ukrainians
Xenophobia	fear/dislike of foreigners

== Medical conditions ==
Phobia	Condition
Osmophobia	hypersensitivity causing aversion to odors
Phonophobia	hypersensitivity causing aversion to sounds
Photophobia	hypersensitivity causing aversion to light

== Cultural phenomena ==
Phobia	Condition
Bibliophobia	fear or hatred of books, as a cultural phenomenon
Lipophobia	avoidance of fats in food
Coronaphobia	fear of COVID-19

== -phobia in the natural sciences ==
In the natural sciences, words with the suffix -phobia/-phobic generally describe a predisposition for avoidance or exclusion.

Phobia	Condition
Acidophobia	preference for non-acidic conditions
Heliophobia	aversion to sunlight
Hydrophobia	the property of being repelled by water
Lipophobicity	the property of fat rejection (sometimes also called lipophobia)
Oleophobicity	the property of oil rejection
Photophobia (biology)	a negative phototaxis or phototropism response, or a tendency to stay out of the light
Ultrahydrophobicity	the property given to materials that are extremely difficult to get wet
Thermophobia	aversion to heat

== Jocular and fictional phobias ==
- Aibohphobia – a humorous term for the fear of palindromes, which is a palindrome itself. The term is a piece of computer humor entered into the 1981 The Devil's DP Dictionary.
- Anatidaephobia – the fictional fear that one is being watched by a duck. The word comes from the name of the family Anatidae, and was used in Gary Larson's The Far Side.
- Anoraknophobia – a portmanteau of "anorak" and "arachnophobia". It was used in the Wallace & Gromit comic book Anoraknophobia. Also the title of an album by Marillion.
- Arachibutyrophobia – fear of peanut butter sticking to the roof of the mouth, from Latin arachis "peanut" and butyrum "butter". The word is used by Charles M. Schulz in a 1982 installment of his Peanuts comic strip, and by Peter O'Donnell in his 1985 Modesty Blaise adventure novel Dead Man's Handle.
- Charlophobia – the fictional fear of any person named Charlotte or Charlie, mentioned in the comedic book A Duck is Watching Me: Strange and Unusual Phobias (2014), by Bernie Hobbs. The phobia was created to mock name bias, a form of discrimination studied by researchers at the University of California, Berkeley and the University of Chicago.
- Hippopotomonstrosesquipedaliophobia – fear of long words, from the root word sesquipedalophobia combined with monstrum and hippopotamus. This was mentioned on the first episode of Brainiac Series Five as a Tickle's Teaser.
- Keanuphobia – fear of Keanu Reeves, portrayed in the Dean Koontz book, False Memory, where a woman has an irrational fear of Reeves and has to see her psychiatrist, Mark Ahriman, each week, unaware that she only has the fear in the first place because Ahriman implanted it via hypnotic suggestion to amuse himself. He calls her "Keanuphobe" in his head.
- Luposlipaphobia – fear of being pursued by timber wolves around a kitchen table while wearing socks on a newly waxed floor. Coined humorously by cartoonist Gary Larson for his comic The Far Side.
- Nihilophobia – fear of nothingness, from Latin nihil and "nothing, none", as described by the Doctor in the Star Trek: Voyager episode "Night". Voyager's morale officer and chef Neelix has this condition, having panic attacks while the ship was traversing a dark expanse of space known as the Void. It is also the title of a 2008 album by Neuronium.
- Robophobia – irrational fear of robots or androids, also known as "Grimwade's Syndrome". It was first used in "The Robots of Death", the fifth serial of the 14th season of the British science fiction television series Doctor Who.
- Semaphobia – fear of average web developers to use Semantic Web technologies.
- Venustraphobia – fear of beautiful women, according to a 1998 humorous article published by BBC News.

== See also ==
- List of paraphilias – List of sexual interests considered atypical
- List of manias
- Childhood phobia – Exaggerated, intense fear found in children
- Specific phobia – Specific, irrational fears
