= Emetophobia =

Fear of vomiting

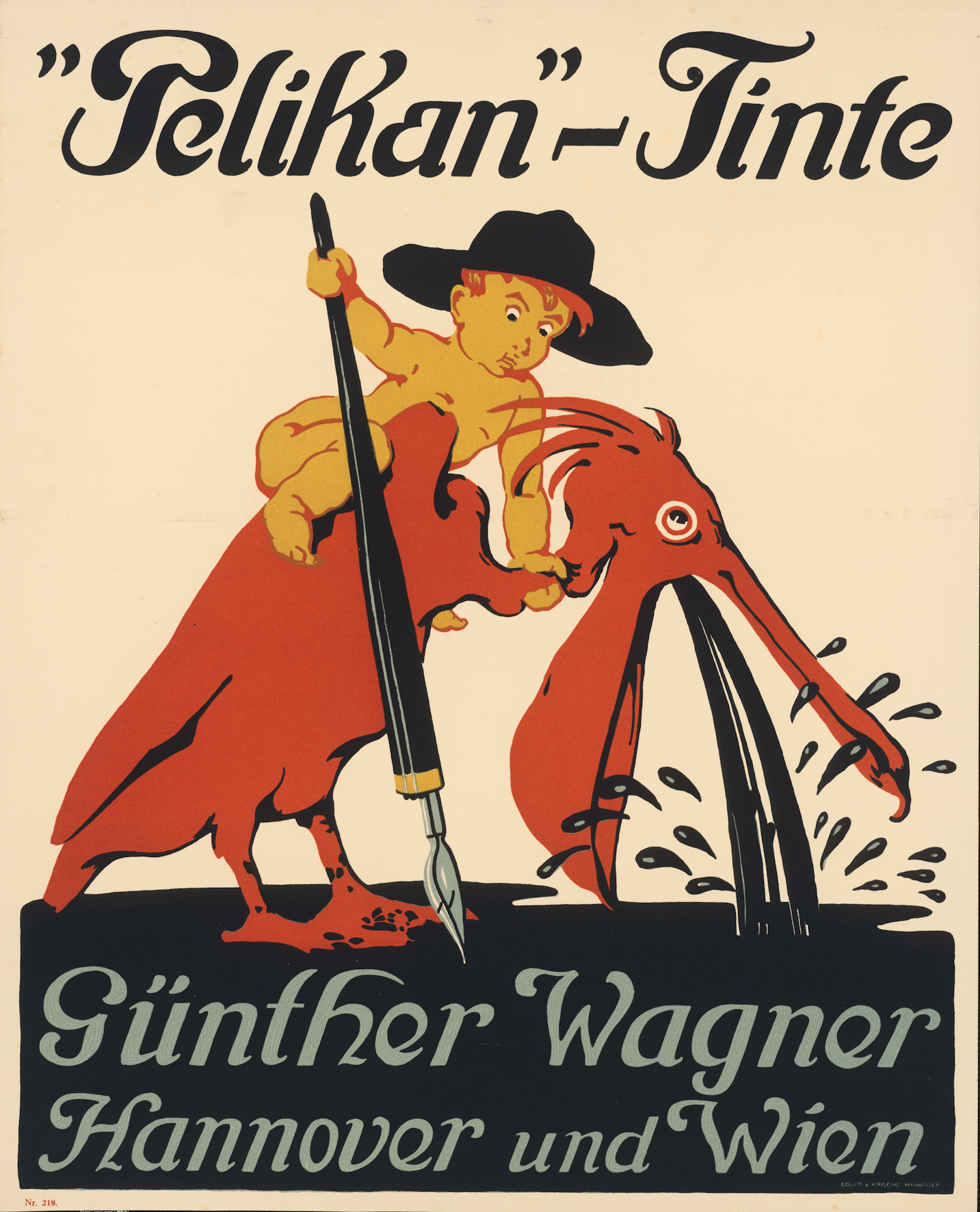
A pelican vomiting black ink, advertising for the Pelikan ink

Emetophobia is a phobia that causes overwhelming, intense anxiety pertaining to vomit. This specific phobia can also include subcategories of what causes the anxiety, including a fear of vomiting, being vomited on, or seeing others vomit. Emetophobes might also avoid the mentions of "barfing", "vomiting", "throwing up", or "puking", or other similar terms.

It is common for those who suffer from emetophobia to be underweight or malnourished due to strict diets and restrictions they make for themselves. The thought of someone possibly vomiting can cause the phobic person to engage in extreme behaviors to escape from their anxiety triggers, e.g. going to great lengths to avoid situations that could be perceived as "threatening".

Emetophobia is clinically considered an "elusive predicament" because limited research has been done pertaining to it. The fear of vomiting receives little attention compared to other fears.

== Etymology ==
The root word for emetophobia is emesis, from the Greek word emein, which means "an act or instance of vomiting", with -phobia meaning "an exaggerated usually inexplicable fear of a particular object, class of objects, or situation."

== Overview ==
The event of vomiting or even any vomit related occasion (for example, mentions in a conversation), may invoke fear in a person. Many people who suffer with emetophobia may feel the need to flee the scene in these situations. Some fear other people throwing up, themselves throwing up, or both. People with emetophobia may also experience anxiety that makes them feel or believe they will throw up, even if they wouldn't.

Those with emetophobia may also experience fears such as not being able to locate a restroom in a timely manner or not having the opportunity to flee from a situation. Other fears may include not being able to stop throwing up, choking on vomit, being embarrassed due to the situation, or having to seek medical attention.

People with emetophobia usually experience varying degrees of anxiety. Those suffering from emetophobia related anxiety may present with behaviour like crying, screaming, and isolating themselves, and in some severe cases, pass out when someone or something has vomited.

=== Causes ===
People with emetophobia frequently report a vomit-related traumatic event, such as a long bout of stomach flu, accidentally vomiting in public or having to witness someone else vomit, as the start of the emetophobia. They may also be afraid of hearing that someone is feeling like vomiting or that someone has vomited or the mention of any word relating to the act of vomiting, usually in conjunction with the fears of seeing someone vomit or seeing vomit.

== Presentation ==
=== Complications ===
Emetophobes may also have other complicating disorders and phobias, such as social anxiety, fear of flying and agoraphobia. These three are very common, because people who fear vomiting are often terrified of doing so or encountering it in a public place. Therefore, they may restrict their social activities so they avoid any situations with alcohol or dining out in restaurants. Emetophobics may also limit exposure to children for fear of germs. People who have a fear of vomiting may avoid travel because of the worry about motion sickness or others experiencing it around them. They may also fear roller coasters for the same reason.

Lipsitz et al.'s findings also showed that those with emetophobia often have difficulties comfortably leading a normal life. Many find that they have problems being alone with young children, and they may also avoid social gatherings where alcohol is present. Retaining an occupation becomes difficult for emetophobics. Emetophobia can also affect a person's social life. The phobia can cause people to miss out on everyday events or requirements. It is common for children to miss school, teens/adults to miss work, and for people to go great measures of not socializing with others. Professions and personal goals can be put on hold due to the high anxiety associated with the phobia, and travelling becomes almost impossible for some.

In Lipsitz et al.'s survey, women with emetophobia said that they either delayed pregnancy or avoided pregnancy altogether because of the morning sickness associated with the first trimester, and if they did become pregnant, it made pregnancy difficult.

Other inhibitions on daily life can be seen in meal preparation. Many emetophobic people also have specific "rituals" for the food they eat and how they prepare it. They frequently check the freshness of the food along with washing it several times in order to prevent any potential sicknesses that they could contract from foods not handled properly. They might overcook food products in fear of getting a foodborne illness Eating out may also be avoided and when asked Lipsitz et al.'s survey, many felt they were underweight because of the strict diets that they put upon themselves. In addition, many emetophobes avoid certain foods all together due to negative memories they may have with it relating to vomiting, and often eat a limited number of foods due to feeling like a vast majority of foods aren't 'safe'. Those who suffer from emetophobia might avoid anything that has an unpleasant smell or aroma, in fear of vomiting. This includes eating anything that might have a bad smell. They might also avoid any sight that may induce vomiting in them or other people.

==== Emetophobia and anorexia ====
There are some cases where anorexia is the result of a fear of vomiting instead of the typical psychological problems that trigger it. In Frank M. Datillio's clinical case study, a situation where anorexia results from emetophobia is mentioned. Datillio says, "...in one particular case report, atypical anorexia in several adolescent females occurred as a result of a fear of vomiting that followed a viral illness as opposed to the specific desire to lose weight or because of an anxiety reaction.". It is not clear that this should be termed "anorexia", however. In cases such as this, many emetophobes may also have avoidant/restrictive food intake disorder (ARFID), which is characterized by a general disinterest in food, sensory issues with food (taste, texture, look, smell) or a fear of adverse consequences from eating (vomiting or choking).

Oftentimes, this phobia is comorbid with several others, making it necessary to deal with each phobia individually in order for the patient to recover fully. For example, it is common for people with emetophobia to also have a fear of food, known as cibophobia, where they worry that the food they are eating is carrying pathogens that can cause vomiting. As such, people will develop specific behaviors that will, in their minds, make the food safe to eat, such as a ritualistic type of washing or the intentional overcooking of meat to avoid the intake of harmful pathogens. In time, these fears can become so ingrained that the person who has them can begin to experience anorexia nervosa. Again, it is not clear that this should be deemed "anorexia" rather than, for instance OCD, given this different presentation.

=== Emetophobia and obsessive–compulsive disorder ===
There are many cases of emetophobes that also suffer from obsessive–compulsive disorder (OCD). Both emetophobia and OCD have similar symptoms and behaviors according to Allen H. Weg, EdD. This includes: "obsessional thinking, hyper-awareness and reactivity, avoidance, compulsive rituals, and safety behaviors". Emetophobia is often misdiagnosed as OCD.

== Causes and signs ==
There is a strong agreement in the scientific community that there is no specific cause of emetophobia. Some emetophobes report a traumatic experience with vomiting, always in childhood. Some experts believe that emetophobia may be linked to worries about lack of control. Many people try to control themselves and their environment in every possible way, but vomiting is difficult or impossible to control which can lead to anxiety or in other cases severe anxiety.

There are many factors that can cause a legitimate case of emetophobia. Dr. Angela L. Davidson et al. conducted an experiment where it was concluded through various surveys that people with emetophobia are more likely to have an internal locus of control pertaining to their everyday life as well as health-related matters. A locus of control is an individual's perception of where control comes from. Having an internal locus of control means that an individual perceives that they have their own control over a situation, whereas an external locus of control means that an individual perceives that some things are out of their control. She explains how this phobia is created through the locus of control by stating, "Thus far, it seems reasonable to stipulate that individuals with a vomiting phobia deem events as being within their control and may therefore find it difficult to relinquish this control during the act of vomiting, thus inducing a phobia."

In an internet survey conducted by Dr. Joshua D. Lipsitz et al. given to emetophobic people, respondents gave many different reasons as to why they became emetophobic. Among some of the causes listed were several severe bouts of vomiting as children and being firsthand witnesses to many severe vomiting in others due to illness, pregnancy or alcoholism.

Some possible signs may include not consuming certain foods or alcohol, not being able to watch vomit scenes during movies or shows, avoiding people that are not feeling well, regularly washing hands, steering clear from traveling and crowds, making sure bathrooms are near, consistently checking signs of illness, avoiding certain smells, or pitching food before the expiration date.

== Treatment ==
=== Assessment ===
There are two assessment tools used to diagnose emetophobia: the Specific Phobia of Vomiting inventory and the Emetophobia Questionnaire. They are self-report questionnaires that focus on a different range of symptoms.

There have been a limited number of studies in regard to emetophobia. Victims of the phobia usually experience fear before vomiting but feel less afterwards. The fear comes back, however, if the victim fears they will throw up again.

=== Medication ===
Also noted in the emetophobia internet survey was information about medications. People were asked whether they would consider taking anxiety medication to potentially help their fear, and many in the study answered they wouldn't for fear that the drugs would make them nauseated. Others, however, stated that some psychotropic medications (such as benzodiazepines and antidepressants) did help with their phobia, and some said gastrointestinal medications were also beneficial.

=== Cognitive behavioral therapy ===
Cognitive behavioral therapy (CBT) is a psychological treatment that can be used to help calm anxiety. It is most commonly used to treat certain behaviors by changing people's actions and thoughts by using a variety of different techniques to figure out why the fear is occurring. Speaking to a therapist can also be beneficial and develop possible coping mechanisms.

=== Exposure treatments ===
Exposure methods, using video-taped exposure to others vomiting, hypnosis, exposure to nausea and exposure to cues of vomiting, systemic behavior therapy, psychodynamic and psychotherapy have also shown positive effects for the treatment of emetophobia. However, in some cases it may cause re-traumatization, and the phobia may become more intense as a result.

== See also ==
- Bulimia nervosa
- Emetophilia
- List of phobias
- Mysophobia
- Nosocomephobia
- Nosophobia
- Pharmacophobia
- Tokophobia
