= Ancraophobia =

Fear of storms

- Other names: Anemophobia
- Specialty: Psychology

Ancraophobia, also known as anemophobia, is an extreme fear of wind or drafts. It can cause panic attacks for those who have the fear, and can make people miss out on regular everyday activities such as going outside.

== Origin ==
This phobia is most commonly the result of psychological trauma caused by a negative experience with wind in the affected person's past. The experience may be remembered, or it may be "imprinted" on the subconscious mind of the traumatized person.

People who have this phobia tend to be frightened by changes in the weather, such as storms. They are likely to believe that the wind has the potential to kill and destroy. Additionally, they avoid things that remind them of wind, like ocean waves. Ancraophobia is also related to aeroacrophobia, which is the fear of open high places, and anemophobia which is the fear of air drafts.

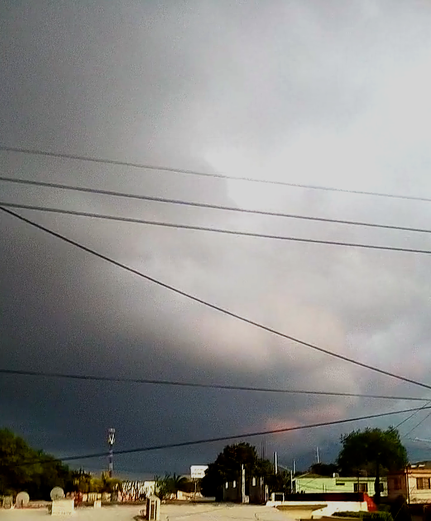
A windy thunderstorm moving into a residential area in Monterrey, Mexico

== Signs and symptoms ==
The level of fear as well as other symptoms will vary between individuals. There are four general types of symptoms: psychological, physical, mental and emotional.

=== Psychological ===
Psychological symptoms include extreme anxiety when exposed to wind, feelings that the wind may harm or hurt the individual, and a compulsion to avoid encountering wind. The fear of wind is caused by the mind over-estimating the danger caused by wind, believing that wind presents an actual threat, when in reality, it may not.

=== Physical ===
Physical symptoms include dry mouth, tremors, tightening in the chest, rapid breathing, sweating of the palms, nausea, and irregular heart beat, and constant need for the wind or storm to pass.

=== Mental ===
- Obsessive thoughts
- Difficulty thinking about anything other than the fear
- Feelings of unreality or of being detached from oneself
- Fear of losing control
- Fear of fainting

=== Emotional ===
- Anticipatory anxiety: persistent worrying about upcoming events that involve air movement.
- Terror: a persistent and overwhelming fear of the same
- Desire to flee: an intense need to leave the situation

== Causes ==
The fear of wind most often arises as a result of a negative experience in the person's past. This experience may or may not be recalled in the conscious mind of the person but has been imprinted on the subconscious mind. Most often an ancraophobic person experienced a situation where the wind was blowing heavily and they found themselves afraid that the wind might destroy or kill them. This experience becomes linked with the wind, and is known as a "generalized conditioned response". This phobia arises from the combination of external events and an internal predisposition. The external events are things like traumatic events, and the internal predispositions are heredity, or having been transferred from one's blood line. The phobia can often be traced back to negative events that have happened; the most common event is the experience of a traumatic experience at an early age.

== Treatment ==
The common medication is anti-anxiety medication. Common popular forms of treatment are cognitive behavioral therapy or hypnotherapy. These therapies are also used to help patients forget what they are afraid of. Some basic therapy sessions involve making the patient stand in front of a fan, or making the patient face their fears in a safe environment. With the use of hypnotherapy, the subconscious mind of a person can be reached, potentially eliminating those fears.

== See also ==
- List of phobias
- Lilapsophobia – fear of tornadoes or hurricanes
