= Masklophobia =

Fear of masks, costumes and mascots

- Other names: Maskaphobia
- Specialty: Psychology

Masklophobia (sometimes referred to as maskaphobia) is a specific phobia used to classify a general and in some cases an irrational fear of masks, people in costumed clothing and mascots which is common among toddlers and young children. The common cause for masklophobia is not known. Coulrophobia can sometimes be associated with masklophobia.

== Signs and symptoms ==
Symptoms of masklophobia are generally seen in the early years of child development, typically between 0–8 years of age. People with masklophobia experience the following symptoms: sweating, screaming, shaking, crying, hiding, running away from the costumed or masked person and heart palpitations. These symptoms are a part of a bigger panic attacks that may occur when near the mask or costumed person or figure. Anxiety symptoms may worsen if the costumed individual gets closer to the person affected with masklophobia. Masklophobia may be exhibited during Halloween in a child, an event in which multiple people put on costumes, usually frightening to children. Some children and adults can also have irrational fears of seeing other people especially strangers in face masks during the global COVID-19 pandemic.

== Causes ==
A widely accepted cause for masklophobia is not known but there multiple possible rationales for why convalescents have irrational fears about masked and costumed characters. One possible cause explained is that a young child's developing mind can have trouble distinguishing reality from fantasy when confronting fictional characters such as Mickey Mouse in human size. Another possible explanation for this phobia is that most children as they are taught not to talk to strangers can be confused and paranoid when encountering a large costumed character. An additional theory can be that the lack of familiarity with a life size costumed character may be frightening due to a child's general expectations of the human facial appearance, which can make it difficult to comprehend with a masked person. This theory is supported by how children generally begin to develop facial recognition skills at around the age of 6, and develop adult recognition skills around the age of 14.

== Treatment ==
Effective treatments for masklophobia are commonly assessed using exposure based therapies to help sufferers confront their phobia of masked and costumed individuals to relieve irrational anxiety and stress, As the common psychological procedure for treating masklophobia is the general standard for treating patients with any type of specific phobia.

== See also ==
- List of phobias
- Specific phobia
- Childhood phobia
