= Lilapsophobia =

Fear of tornadoes or hurricanes

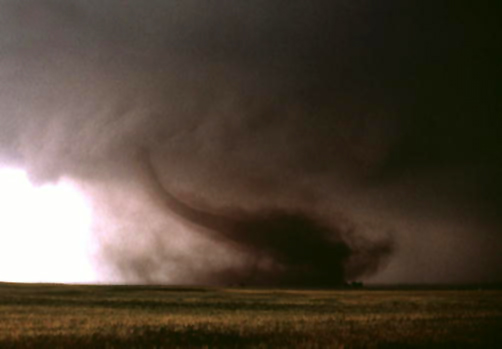
- Photograph of an F2 tornado near New Cordell, Oklahoma during the May 1981 tornado outbreak
- Specialty: Psychology

Lilapsophobia is the fear of tornadoes or hurricanes. Lilapsophobia is considered the more severe type of astraphobia, which is a fear of thunder and lightning.

== Signs and symptoms ==
Mental and emotional symptoms of lilapsophobia include

- Obsessive thoughts
- Difficulty thinking
- Feeling of unreality or being detached
- Fear of losing control or going crazy
- Anticipatory anxiety
- Terror
- Desire to flee or hide

Physical symptoms of lilapsophobia include

- Dizziness, shaking, palpitations, lightheaded, or faint
- Shortness of breath
- Accelerated heartbeat
- Chest pain or discomfort
- Shaking
- Feeling of choking
- Sweating
- Nausea
- Numbness or tingling sensations

Many lilapsophobes also suffer autophobia, fear of being alone. Sufferers often make arrangements with people they know to help soothe the fear.

== Causes ==
Like many phobias, lilapsophobia is caused by an unwanted experience, specifically tornadoes or hurricanes that cause injuries, destruction, or loss of loved ones to self or others they know. People who survive those storms are advised to seek professional advice, especially to determine if a person is suffering post-traumatic stress disorder. This phobia can even be caused by learning news about tornadoes or hurricanes using the media, like television, internet, radio, or newspaper, even though they happened far away from homes.

If a person learns that someone in the family has the phobia, then that person is more likely to suffer from it.

== Effects ==
Lilapsophobes spend a lot of time watching the weather or checking weather online to keep an eye out for oncoming storms. When a storm hits, sufferers either watch for severe weather alerts constantly or take cover, like under the bed or in the windowless room. In the extreme cases, sufferers take tornado shelter as soon as rain starts falling, usually in the basement or storm shelter. Sufferers who have weather radio or mobile phones can watch the radar and alerts using it while hiding.

== Treatment ==
Like many other phobias, lilapsophobia can often be treated using cognitive-behavioral therapy, but if it stems from post-traumatic stress disorder, then alternative therapy may be more recommended.

== Etymology ==
The Greek basis word is λαῖλα|ψ -απος, meaning storm, laíla|ps -apos for which reason the term should strictly have been *lailapophobia – like myrmecophobia from mýrmē|x -ēkos. Greek words ending in ψ (ps) and ξ (ks) would regularly become -pos / -kos (respectively) in oblique cases, conventionally given as the genitive form. This rule also obtains for Latin, cf. pax, pac|is, and it is from the accusative form pacem that all Romance languages have taken their words for “peace”. Historically this rule has been “forgotten” – one result is the fallacious neologism “lilapsophobia”.

How the i came into the picture instead of ai remains to be settled. Hypothesis: Since the Greek word lailaps would reflect American usage in pronouncing *lilaps [laílæps] – it is in the US that tornadoes are commonplace – the latter “hypercorrect” version became the written form.

== In children ==
Like astraphobia, lilapsophobia is a common fear for children, although less common. Because children are just learning to distinguish between fantasy and reality, major storm broadcasts on television or discussion by parents can cause fear that the storm is coming with a tornadic potential or a hurricane.

Because fear is a part of normal child development, this phobia is not diagnosed unless if persisted for more than six months. Parents should conquer the child's fear by telling them how rare the major storms that hit hometown area are.

== In popular culture ==
In the 1996 film Twister, Dr. Jo Harding (Helen Hunt), while becoming a storm chaser, has lilapsophobia due to her father's death in a tornado when she was a child.

== See also ==
- List of phobias
