= Heliophobia =

Fear of the sun

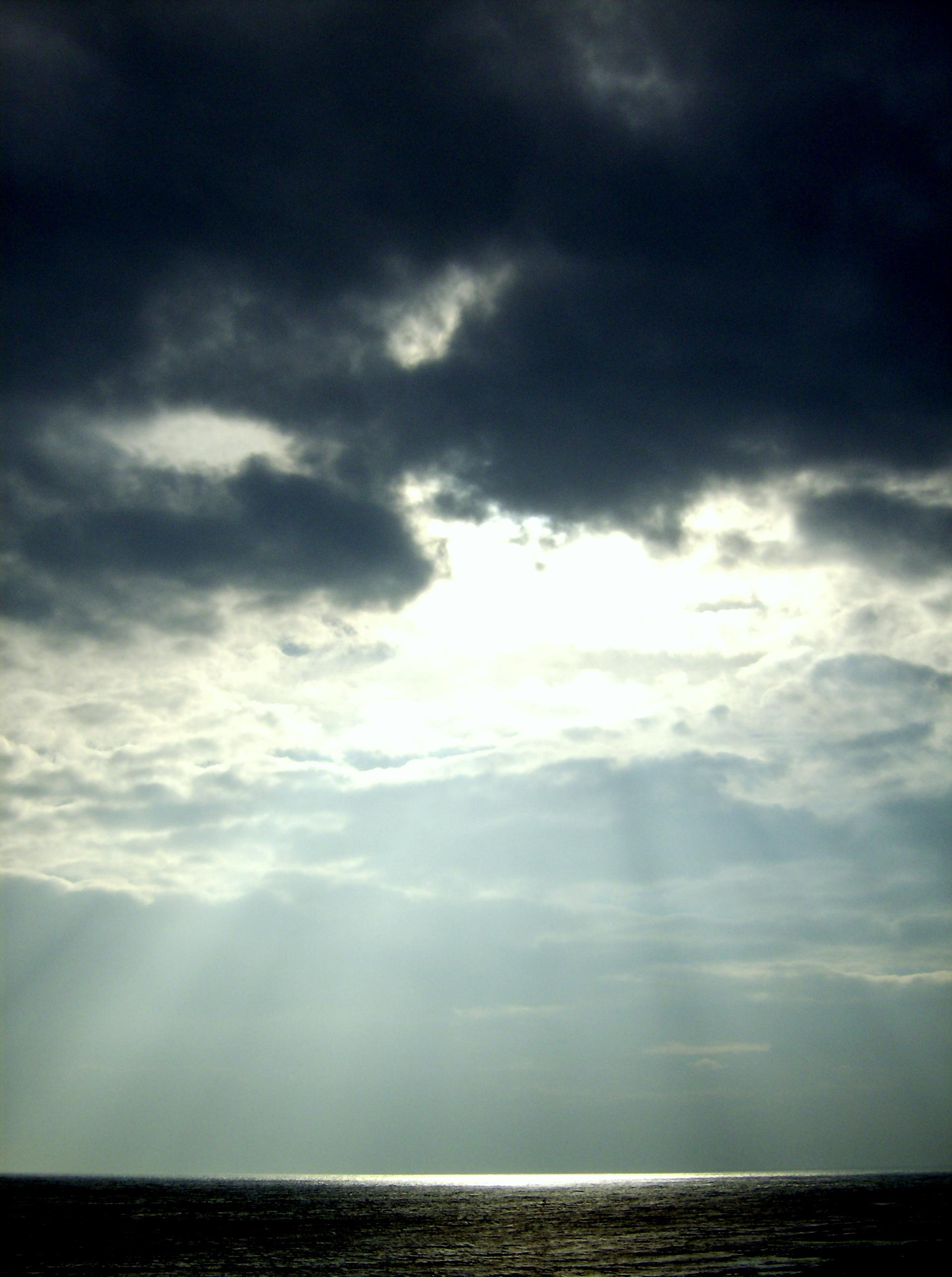
- Sunlight can be a trigger for some suffering from Heliophobia
- Specialty: Psychiatry

Heliophobia is the fear of the Sun, sunlight, or any bright light. It is a type of specific phobia.

== Signs and symptoms ==
The symptoms of heliophobia depends on the person. Mild sufferers may feel uncomfortable, shaky, nauseated, or numb. Severe sufferers may feel anxious or suffer panic attacks. Other symptoms include heightened senses, lack of focus, feeling trapped, irregular heartbeat, air hunger, rapid breathing, parched mouth, sweating, muscle cramps, and physical discomfort that is not actually caused by bodily injury, but is a physical manifestation of the panic and fear that the heliophobic person experiences when exposed to light. This physical pain may be expressed, for example, as a phantom sensation of their skin burning under direct sunlight, even when it is visually apparent that their skin is not actually burning any more than healthy skin would as a result of sun exposure, but nonetheless still feels like real pain for the sufferer. However, other differential diagnoses like the rare genetic defect erythropoietic protoporphyria characterized by a severe burning sensation of all exposed skin areas without leading to immediate visible signs have to be excluded.

== Causes ==
Phobias are classified as a type of anxiety disorder. There is often no discernible cause of phobia onset, though Rachman describes three possibilities: classical conditioning, vicarious acquisition and informational/instructional acquisition. Occasionally they are triggered by harmful events surrounding the phobic object or situation - in this case, for example, severe sunburn, chronic light-triggered migraines, or trauma accompanied by bright sunlight.

According to the DSM-5, heliophobia would be listed under the category of "specific phobia". The Pacific Health Center suggested that people have been staying away from the sunlight because of growing fear of skin cancer or blindness. This is not technically heliophobia, but simply an unfounded illogical solution. It includes an intense fear of being harmfully affected by exposure to the sun or to bright lights, can also cause heliophobia. Forms of heliophobia based on such fears can cause the sufferer to eventually develop fear of being in public or fear of people in general by association, as a crippling fear of bright light can significantly limit the places a heliophobe can comfortably visit, as well as prevent that person from going outside during the daytime, when most other people are active.

Other medical conditions such as keratoconus (an eye disorder that results in extreme optic sensitivity to sunlight and bright lights), migraine which can be triggered by bright light, and porphyria cutanea tarda, which causes the skin to be overly sensitive to sunlight to the point of causing blisters, can result in heliophobia if the sufferer begins to associate pain and discomfort with bright lights.

== Effects ==
Sufferers may cover themselves with long, protective clothing or carry a sun parasol when going outdoors during the daytime, or simply never go outdoors at all when the sun is out, depending on the severity of the fear. Since sufferers stay indoors more than non-sufferers, it will make them more prone to becoming vitamin D deficient, as well as depression caused by a combination of vitamin D deficiency, isolation and feelings of alienation from other people, and a continuously dark environment. However, a vitamin deficiency can be helped by taking vitamin D supplements or by consuming vitamin D fortified foods.

== Treatment ==
Heliophobia can be treated using talk therapy, exposure therapy, self-help techniques, support groups, cognitive-behavioral therapy, and relaxation techniques. For people who are severely heliophobic, anti-anxiety meditation is a recommended mode of treatment.

== See also ==
- List of phobias
