= Fear of Falling =

Fear of Falling may refer to:

- Fear of falling, a natural fear typical of most humans and mammals

== Film and TV ==
- "Fear of Falling", an episode of All Grown Up!
- Fear of Falling, working title of A Master Builder, a 2014 film by Jonathan Demme

== Music ==
- "Fear of Falling" (The Badlees song), from 1995 album River Songs
- "Fear of Falling", a song and EP by Paul Johnson (singer)
- "Fear of Falling", a song by Cutting Crew from their debut album Broadcast
- "Fear of Falling", a song by Uriah Heep from Sea of Light
- "Fear of Falling", the B-side of "Apply Some Pressure" by Maxïmo Park
- "Fear of Falling", a song by Shona Laing from New On Earth album

== Other ==
- Fear of Falling: The Inner Life of the Middle Class, a book by Barbara Ehrenreich
- "Fear of Falling", a story by Neil Gaiman collected in The Sandman: Fables & Reflections

== See also ==
- Basophobia (disambiguation)
