= Ailurophobia =

Fear of cats

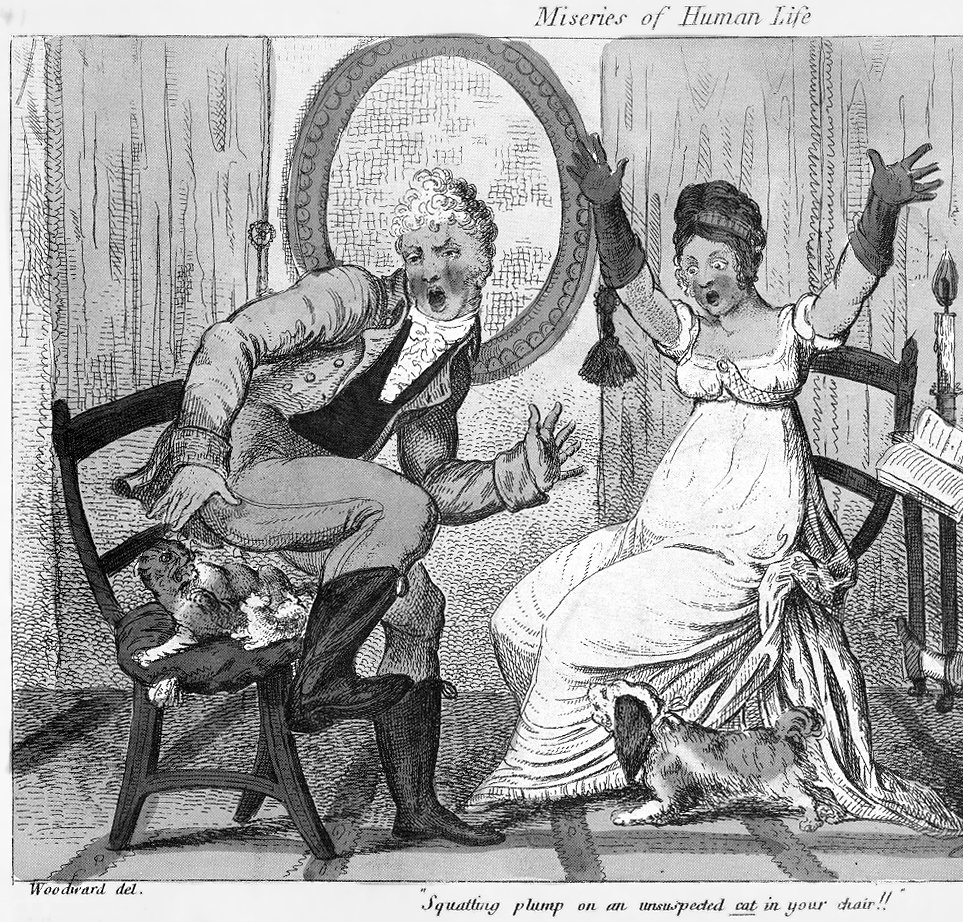
An illustration of two people being frightened by a cat, c. 1808

Ailurophobia (/aɪˌlʊərəˈfoʊbiə/) is the persistent and excessive fear of cats and felines in general. Like other specific phobias, the exact cause of ailurophobia is unknown, and potential treatment generally involves therapy. The name comes from the Greek words αἴλουρος (ailouros), 'cat', and φόβος (phóbos), 'fear'. Other names for ailurophobia include: felinophobia, elurophobia, gatophobia, and cat phobia. A person with this phobia is known as an ailurophobe.

== Description ==
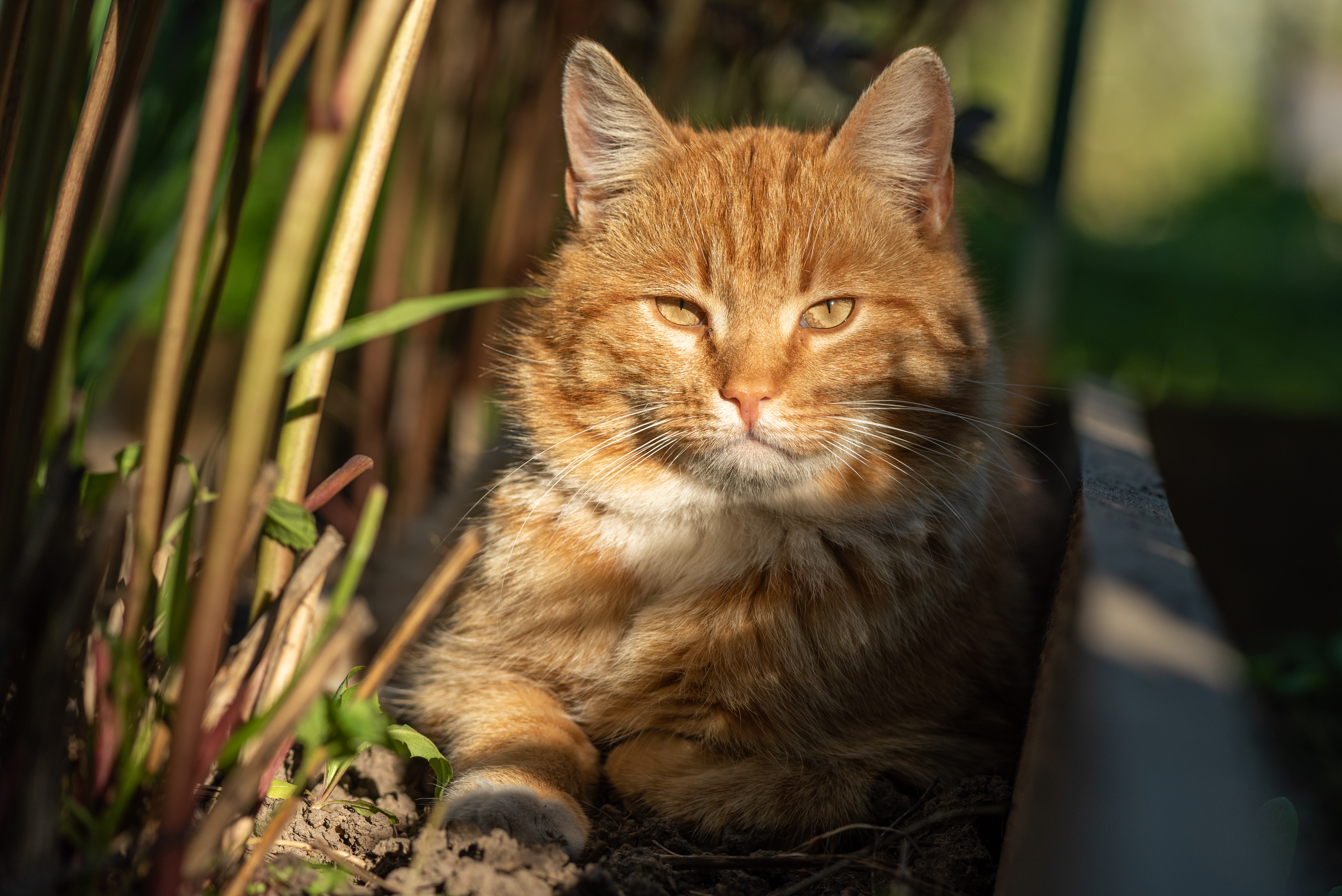
People with Ailurophobia will feel uneasy and may have panic attacks around a cat

Ailurophobia is relatively uncommon compared with other zoophobias, such as ophidiophobia or arachnophobia. Ailurophobes may experience panic and fear when thinking about cats, imagining an encounter with a cat, inadvertently making physical contact with a cat, or seeing depictions of cats in media. The fear can also prevent the ailurophobe from doing certain activities, like visiting friends' houses, for fear of encountering a cat. They may experience extreme anxiety and fear when hearing meowing, hissing, or other sounds that the ailurophobe associates with cats. In one case, it was reported that a patient with ailurophobia was unable to touch clothing that had a soft, fur-like texture, possibly due to the clothing's similarity to a cat's fur.

== Causes ==
Though the exact cause of ailurophobia is unknown, ailurophobes often trace their fear back to early childhood. This is a trend observed in many other specific phobias, especially those involving animals. One theory is that a singular traumatic incident, like being attacked by a cat or witnessing a cat attack someone else, can trigger the development of this phobia. Other theories as to the cause of ailurophobia include exposure to someone else's ailurophobia, or being inundated with troubling information about the danger of cats.

== Treatment ==
It is widely believed that one of the best treatments for animal phobia is exposure therapy. Exposure therapy is conducted by systematically exposing a patient to stimuli that are increasingly fear-inducing while only progressing when the patient is comfortable with the prior stimulus. For example, one ailurophobic patient underwent exposure therapy for her fear by being exposed to fur-like fabric, pictures of cats, a toy cat, and finally a friendly live kitten, which the patient subsequently adopted; as the kitten grew and remained friendly, the patient was able to be less afraid of full-grown cats. This method is used to help patients with both ailurophobia and cynophobia.

There are no medications designed to treat ailurophobia. D-cycloserine has been linked to facilitating better results in exposure therapy.

== See also ==
- List of phobias
- A Charlie Brown Christmas, in which Lucy Van Pelt incorrectly refers to the phobia as ailurophasia while trying to diagnose Charlie Brown's fears.
