= Chronophobia =

Fear of the passage of time

Chronophobia, also known as prison neurosis, is considered an anxiety disorder describing the fear of time and time moving forward, which is commonly seen in prison inmates. Next to prison inmates, chronophobia was also identified in individuals who experienced quarantine due to COVID-19. As time is understood as a specific concept, chronophobia is categorized as a specific phobia.

The term chronophobia comes from the Greek "chronos", meaning time, and "phobo", meaning fear.

== Symptoms ==
Chronophobia manifests in different ways, since every person that experiences this disorder suffers from different symptoms. Inmates experience a constant psychological discomfort that is characterized through anxiety, panic, and claustrophobia by the duration and immensity of time. The main symptom of chronophobia is a sense of impending danger of loss and the accompanying desire to keep the memory of things which happened in the past. The most common signs include procrastination, poor planning of the working day, the inability to refuse, distraction and trying to do too much at one time. People also report feeling a general lack of time, often associated with fear and difficulty in completing tasks when scheduled or due.

== Reasons ==
=== Risk factors and causes ===
Some people are more likely to have chronophobia. The risk is increased for elderly or ill because persons who are older or who have terminal medical conditions are more likely to be overpowered by fear of approaching death. They may become fixated on the number of days they have left, which can cause severe anxiety. People in prison are also more likely to develop chronophobia. Prison neurosis is another name for this illness. Inmates, particularly those serving extended sentences, often become fixated on the passage of time. They may believe that time is passing them either too slowly or too rapidly, and they frequently count down the days until they are released. They may also experience claustrophobic feelings while in prison. People who have undergone a traumatic experience are also more likely to suffer from chronophobia. They could get it as a result of PTSD. Many people developed chronophobia after being quarantined due to COVID-19. They got fixated on keeping track of time or felt helpless in the face of the passage of time. People who have a history of mental illness make up the final group. Ones with a generalized anxiety disorder, a history of panic attacks or panic disorder, or other phobias are more at risk. If one has depression or a substance addiction problem, the person is also more likely to develop a phobia.

Chronophobia and other phobias are caused by a combination of environmental and genetic factors. Chronophobia can develop as a result of being imprisoned, having a fatal illness, or surviving a traumatic experience. People who suffer from anxiety or suffer from mental illness are more likely to develop phobias. Mental disease, mood problems, and phobias are often passed down through generations. If you have a family who has certain illnesses, you are at a higher risk.

=== Triggers ===
Chronophobia causes worry, dread, and anxiety for a variety of reasons. Holidays, birthdays, graduations, and anniversaries can all be triggers for this phobia. And when being triggered, the following concerns appear:

- They are powerless to stop time from passing them by.
- Their own passing. They may also be terrified of death or dying (thanatophobia).
- Time feeling "immense" (very big) or overwhelming.
- Time moving too slowly.

== Treatments ==
=== Cognitive behavioral therapy ===
Cognitive behavioral therapy (CBT) is a form of talking therapy where the aim is to correct maladaptive thoughts that have a significant negative effect on a person's life. CBT can be used for the treatment of specific phobias. The therapist creates a personalized plan that suits each phobia and person the best. The therapy is goal-oriented and structured and aims to change negative thought patterns during emotional distress and help patients gain information about how their thoughts affect their actions. The goal of the therapy in the case of chronophobia is to gain control over the anxiety and the behavioral patterns created by the overpowering fear responses.

=== Psychopharmacology ===
In some cases, anxiety medication can lead to milder symptoms in phobias. However, when compared to behavioral therapy the results are often less efficient. Short-term pharmacological options often get paired with cognitive behavioral therapy. Long-term plans are rare and are often linked to cases of adverse drug reactions. Specific phobic disorders like chronophobia can be treated with benzodiazepines, selective serotonin reuptake inhibitors (SSRIs), serotonin noradrenaline reuptake inhibitors (SNRIs), monoamine oxidase inhibitors (MAOIs) and β-adrenergic blockers.

=== Hypnotherapy ===
Hypnotherapy strives for a deep level of awareness through focused attention and a structured relaxation process. During the naturally occurring state of heightened awareness or "trance", qualified therapists can help people tune in on the targeted negative or fearful thoughts. It can be used to shape the understanding of the anxiety symptoms connected to chronophobia by altering different structures in memory and perception.

== Coping methods ==
=== Relaxation techniques ===
The aim of relaxation techniques is to decrease an individual's physical and psychological anxiety by increasing the individual's sense of calm. Muscle tension and an increased heart rate are physical responses to anxiety, and emotions are psychological responses to anxiety. Relaxation techniques bring an individual's attention to their breathing rhythm which can have a relaxing effect and decrease their chronophobia related anxiety. It also brings attention to their body which has them focusing on the present.

Relaxation techniques	Description
Deep breathing exercises (Diaphragmatic breathing)	Individuals inhale and exhale slowly and deeply.
Progressive relaxation	Individuals tense and then relax different muscle groups in the body one by one.
Passive relaxation	The individual goes through each muscle group and identifies any tense muscles. They then relax the muscle. The individual does not consciously tense their muscles as is done in progressive relaxation.
Autogenic training	An individual performs different exercises, such as lifting their arm, while repeatedly telling themselves different statements.
Guided imagery	Individuals attempt to invoke the feeling of calm and relaxation in their bodies by picturing different images that they connect with those feelings.
Biofeedback-assisted relaxation	The use of electronics to monitor and be aware of one's bodily responses.

=== Mindfulness techniques ===
Mindfulness techniques can be useful in reducing one's anxiety of passing time because it refocuses one's attention on the present.

Meditation is a practice that focuses on sensations, objects, feelings, thoughts and breathing techniques. Mindfulness meditation consists of two parts. First, one pays attention to the present and specifically focusing on one's feelings, thoughts, and sensations. Secondly, one accepts their thoughts and feelings without reaction or judgement before letting them go. The objective of mindfulness meditation is to reduce an individual's anxiety of passing time by refocusing their attention on their breathing and their 5 senses, both of which are neutral topics without emotional connections to chronophobia.

Yoga is a combination of exercise and meditation and is often used within mindfulness meditation. Individuals focus on their breathing and balance as they move their bodies into different positions. Like mindfulness meditation yoga brings attention to one's thoughts, feelings and sensations. It promotes a healthy mental state in individual's with chronophobia related stress and anxiety by switching their focus to the exercises.

=== Support groups ===
A support group consists of several individuals facing a similar struggle, such as chronophobia, and a leader. Typically the support group is led by someone who is not currently struggling with the same problems as the other members. The goal of a support group is to overcome their shared problem, or if that is not possible, to find ways of coping with it. Within a chronophobia support group, members can offer and gain advice on how to cope with chronophobia. One also has the opportunity to share their experience and hear other individual's experience with chronophobia, which can help them not feel as alone in their struggle.

== Epidemiology ==
Populations with a higher prevalence of chronophobia are prisoners, therefore also sometimes called "prison neurosis". Elderly and also people facing a deathly illness who worry that they will soon die may also experience this fear. People who have survived extreme trauma such as a natural disaster or a shipwreck are also at risk if they remain anxious and uncertain about the passing time and how much they have left.

== See also ==
- List of phobias
- Phobia
- Anxiety disorder
- Specific phobia
- Neurosis
