= Astraphobia =

Fear of thunder and lightning

- Other names: Astrapophobia, brontophobia, ceraunophobia, tonitrophobia
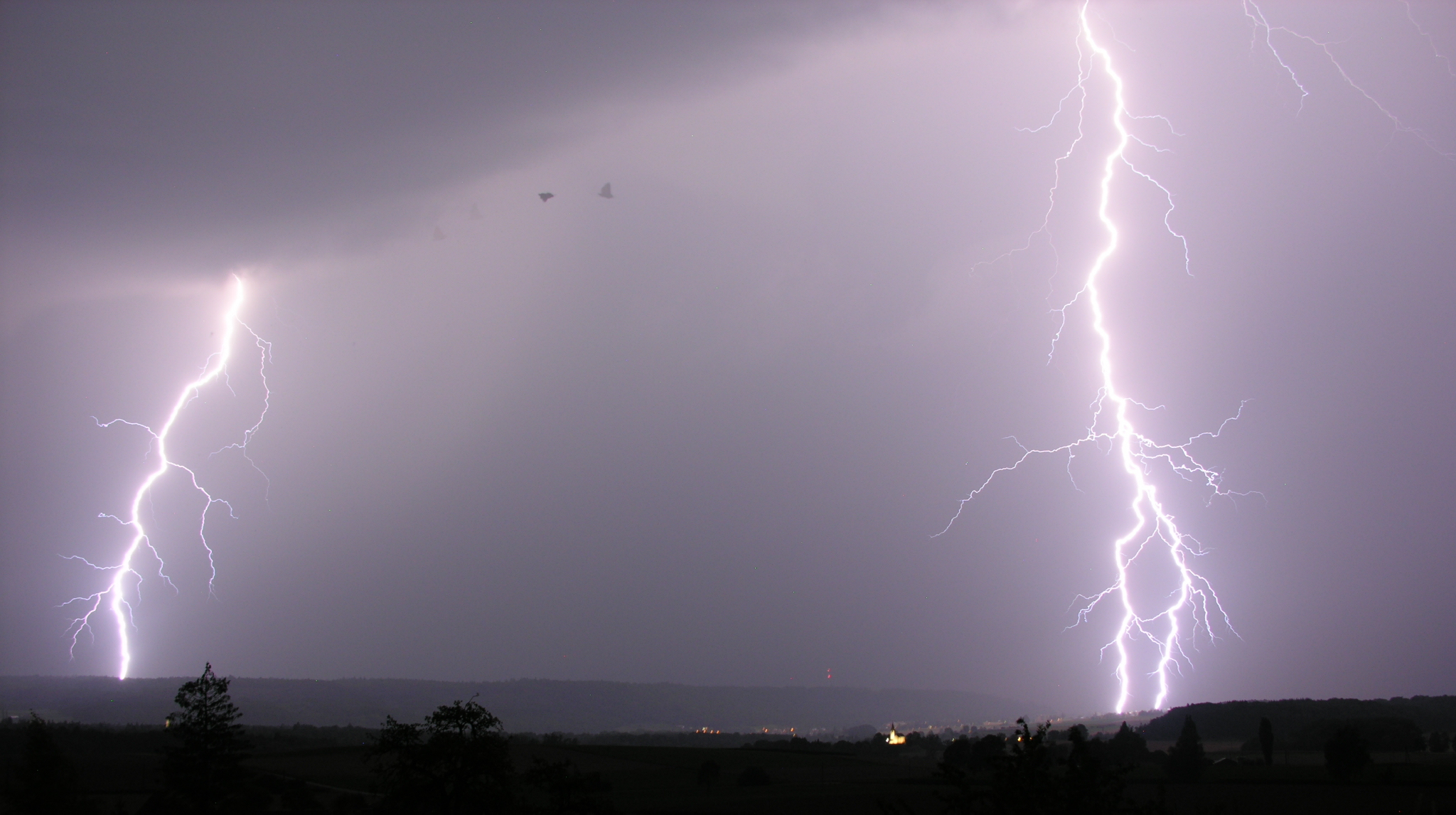
- Lightning strikes during a storm
- Specialty: Psychology

Astraphobia, also known as astrapophobia, brontophobia, ceraunophobia, or tonitrophobia, is the fear of thunder and lightning or an unwarranted fear of scattered or isolated thunderstorms, a type of specific phobia. It is a treatable phobia that both humans and animals can develop. The term astraphobia comes from Ancient Greek ἀστραπή (astrape), meaning "thunder", and φόβος (phóbos), meaning "fear".

== Signs and symptoms ==
A person with astraphobia will often feel anxious during a thunderstorm even when they understand that the threat to them is minimal. Some symptoms are those accompanied with many phobias, such as trembling, crying, sweating, panicked reactions, sudden feeling of using the bathroom, nausea, feeling of dread, insertion of the fingers in the ears, and rapid heartbeat. However, there are some reactions that are unique to astraphobia. For instance, reassurance from other people is usually sought, and symptoms worsen when alone. Many people who have astraphobia will look for extra shelter from the storm. They might hide underneath a bed, under the covers, in a closet, in a basement, or any other space where they feel safer. Efforts are usually made to smother the sound of the thunder; the person may cover their ears or curtain the windows.

A typical sign that someone has astraphobia is a very heightened interest in weather forecasts. A person with astraphobia may be alert for news of incoming storms. They may watch the weather on television constantly during rainy bouts and may even track thunderstorms online. This can become severe enough that the person may not go outside without checking the weather first. This can lead to anxiety and in very extreme cases, agoraphobia, the fear of leaving the home.

== Children ==
In 2007, scientists found astraphobia is the third most prevalent phobia in the US. It can occur in people of any age. It occurs in many children, and should not be immediately identified as a phobia because children naturally go through many fears as they mature. Their fear of thunder and lightning cannot be considered a fully developed phobia unless it persists for more than six months. In this case, the child's phobia should be addressed, as it may become a serious problem in adulthood.

To lessen a child's fear during thunderstorms, the child can be distracted by games and activities. A bolder approach is to treat the storm as an entertainment.

== Treatment ==
The most widely used and possibly the most effective treatment for astraphobia is exposure to thunderstorms and eventually building an immunity. Some other treatment methods include cognitive behavioral therapy (CBT) and dialectical behavioral therapy (DBT). The patient will in many cases be instructed to repeat phrases to themselves in order to become calm during a storm. Heavy breathing exercises can reinforce this effort.

== Dogs and cats ==
Dogs may exhibit severe anxiety during thunderstorms; between 15 and 30 percent may be affected. Research confirms high levels of cortisol – a hormone associated with stress – affects dogs during and after thunderstorms. Remedies include behavioral therapies such as counter conditioning and desensitization, anti-anxiety medications, and dog appeasing pheromone, a synthetic analogue of a hormone secreted by nursing canine mothers.

Studies have also shown that cats can be afraid of thunderstorms. Whilst it is less common, cats have been known to hide under a table or behind a couch during a thunderstorm.

Generally if any animal is anxious during a thunderstorm or any similar, practically harmless event (e.g. fireworks display), it is advised to simply continue behaving normally, instead of attempting to comfort animals.

== See also ==
- Lilapsophobia
- List of phobias
