= Fear of crossing streets =

Type of phobia

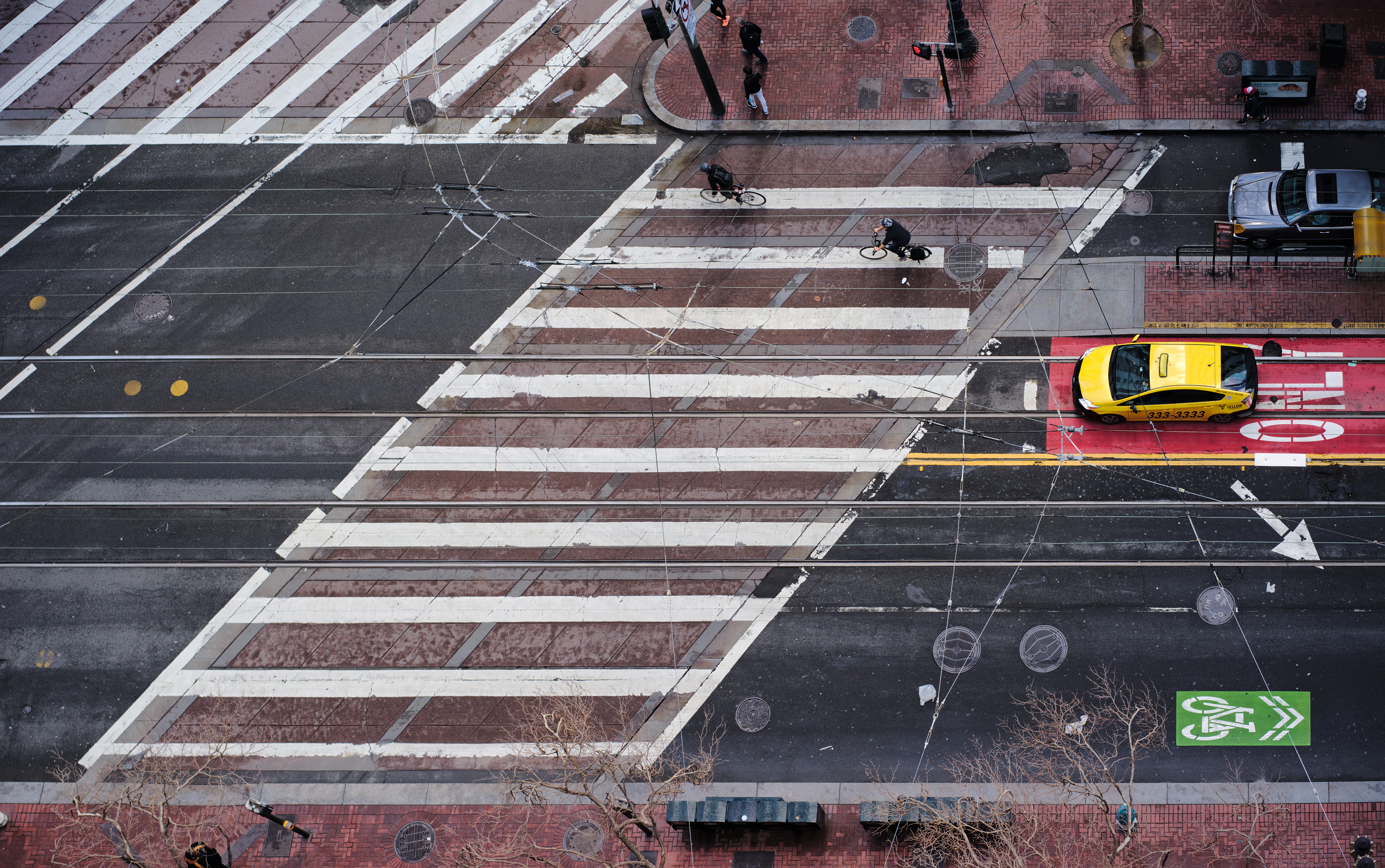
Pedestrian crossing

The fear of crossing streets, or its terms dromophobia and agyrophobia, is a specific phobia that affects a person's ability to cross a street or roadway where cars or vehicles may be present. The term dromophobia comes from the Greek dromos, meaning racetrack.

== Causes of dromophobia ==
Dromophobia may result from experiencing a road accident and thus may be classified as a subtype of panic disorder with agoraphobia (PDA). As such, dromophobia, especially fear of crossing streets alone may be a component of accident-related posttraumatic stress disorder, as a reaction to a situation reminiscent of the past traumatic event. Sometimes this behavior may be misinterpreted during PTSD symptom assessment as a caution (i.e., a normal learning behavior) rather than fear (which is an abnormal avoidant behavior).

Fear of crossing streets may also result from an anticipatory anxiety related to person's limited mobility. For example, a person with stiff-person syndrome may experience attacks of increasing stiffness or spasms while crossing the street.

Dromophobia may be present in people, especially children, with autism, or other neurological conditions that impact the ability to judge the speed of an approaching car.

== See also ==
- Incident stress
