= Zoophobia =

Irrational fear of animal species

Zoophobia, or animal phobia, is the irrational fear or aversion towards animals, both wild and domesticated. Zoophobia is the general negative reaction to animals, but it is usually divided into many subgroups, each being of a specific type of zoophobia. Although zoophobia as a whole is quite rare, types of the fear are common. As mentioned before by Sigmund Freud, an animal phobia is one of the most frequent psychoneurotic diseases among children.

Phobia	Condition
Ailurophobia	fear of cats (or felines)
Alektorophobia	fear of chickens
Anatidaephobia	fear of ducks
Arachnophobia	fear of arachnids (such as spiders)
Batrachophobia	fear of frogs and other amphibians
Chapodiphobia	fear of octopuses
Cephalophobia	fear of octopuses
Cynophobia	fear of dogs
Entomophobia	fear of insects
Ichthyophobia	fear of fish
Katsaridaphobia	fear of cockroaches
Herpetophobia	fear of reptiles
Hippophobia	fear of horses
Lepidopterophobia	fear of lepidopterans (butterflies/moths)
Lutraphobia	fear of ferrets
Myrmecophobia	fear of ants
Melissophobia/apiphobia	fear of bees
Musophobia	fear of mice and rats
Octopophobia	fear of octopuses
Ophidiophobia	fear of snakes
Ornithophobia	fear of birds
Ostraconophobia	fear of shellfish
Spheksophobia	fear of wasps
Vermiphobia	fear of worms

== See also ==
- List of phobias
