= Mycophobia =

Fear of mushrooms

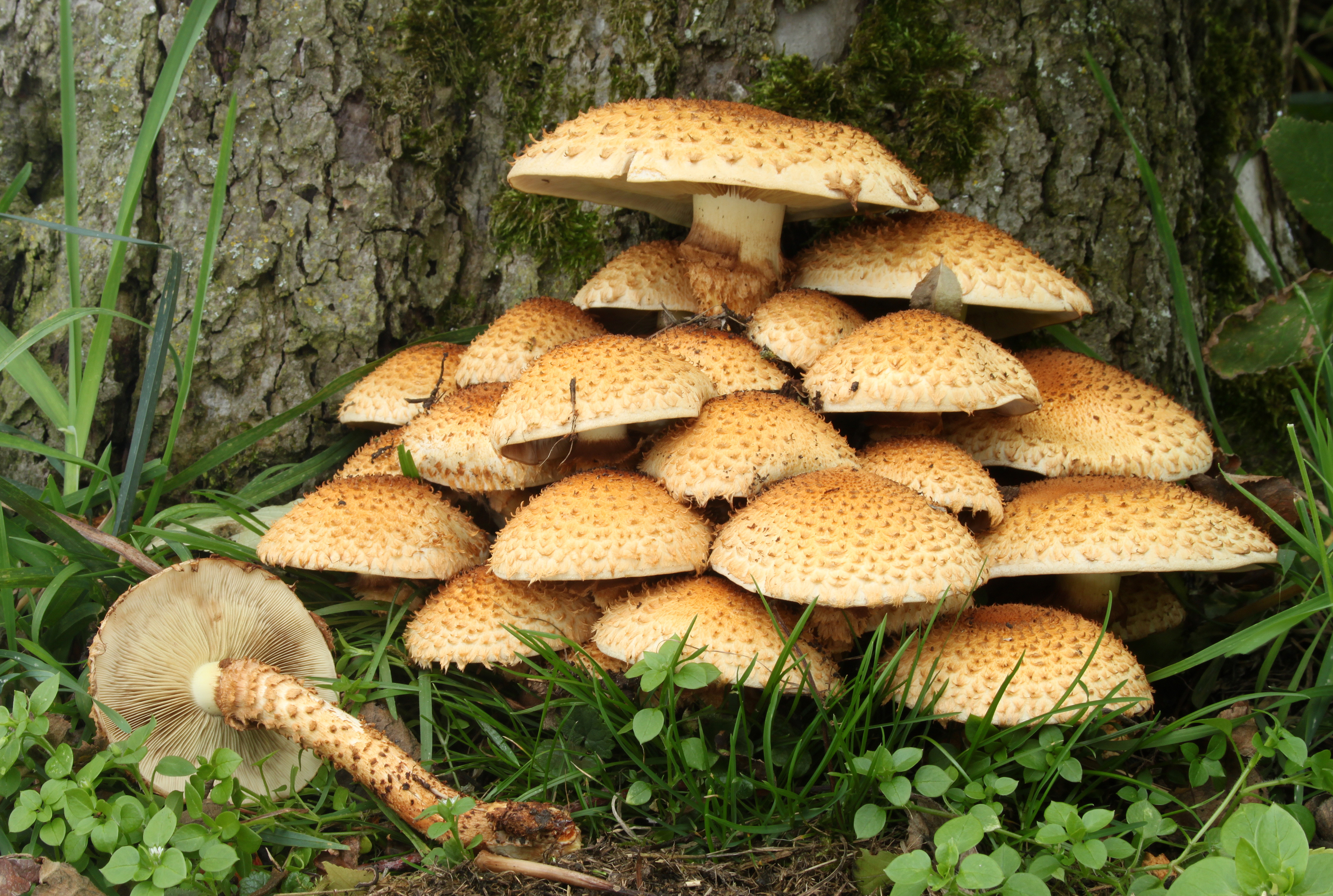
- People with Mycophobia experience unease and anxiety in the presence of Mushrooms
- Specialty: Psychology

Mycophobia is the fear of mushrooms and fungi. People with this phobia will have anxiety, distress, stomach pain and more.

== History ==
The term mycophobia was coined by R. Gordon Wasson and his wife Valentina Pavlovna Wasson in 1957, when they published a seminal work titled Mushrooms, Russia, and History. Looking into the relationship between humans and mushrooms, their work explores "mycophobic cultures, focusing mostly on English-speaking and Germanic countries, which are generally suspicious of mushrooms and mostly associate them with danger and toxicity."

== See also ==
- List of phobias
