= Kinesiophobia =

Fear of pain due to movement

Kinesiophobia is the fear of movement.

It is a term used in the context of rehabilitation medicine and physical therapy. Kinesiophobia is a factor that hinders rehabilitation and actually prolongs disability and pain.

Kinesiophobia can be a factor in increased time to return to participation in pre-injury activities. It has been shown that higher levels of kinesiophobia are linked to a lack of re-entry into pre-injury activities. There are a number of variables affecting return to sport following injuries or surgeries that are multifactorial. Psychological factors can influence the rate and ability of a person's return to sport or daily functional living. Psychological measures and tests that are commonly used to properly evaluate return to sport include the Tampa Scale for Kinesiophobia (TSK), the Incredibly Short Profile of Mood States (ISP), the Hospital Anxiety and Depression Scale (HADS), and the Multidimensional Health Locus of Control Scale (MHLC). These are just a small sample of different tests used to evaluate the mental status of the patient preoperative and postoperative.

Research has been conducted to explore the level of association between kinesiophobia and pain in people with chronic musculoskeletal pain (CMP). The evidence this study presents reveals that there is a connection between a greater degree of kinesiophobia and greater levels of pain intensity. The study has also found moderate evidence between a greater level of kinesiophobia and higher levels of pain severity and quality of life among people with CMP. These results suggest that clinicians should consider kinesiophobia as an important factor in their preliminary assessment of CMP patients Emerging evidence suggests that kinesiophobia is associated with altered movement patterns, including protective or compensatory strategies that may contribute to persistent dysfunction. Systematic review findings further indicate that interventions combining education with graded exposure to movement can reduce fear-avoidance behaviors and improve motor function during rehabilitation.

Kinesiophobia can be measured by doing multiple tests for fear of falling, fear of pain, fear of movement-related pain, etc. There have been multiple studies for some of these fears and the best instruments that were used. The most common instruments that were used were TSK, PASS, and SAFFE.

Kinesiophobia is very common in chronic fatigue syndrome.

== See also ==
- List of phobias
