= Oneirophobia =

Fear of dreams

- Specialty: Psychology

Oneirophobia (from Greek όνειρο (oneiro), meaning "dream", and φόβος (phobos), meaning "fear") is the fear of dreams.

The fear involves suffering due to experiences with frightening dreams (nightmares and/or night terrors) or by negative events in the life affecting those dreams. Some sufferers try to avoid sleep or falling asleep altogether. Those with post-traumatic stress disorder (PTSD), for instance, often re-experience their trauma in nightmares, so frequently that they attempt to avoid these painful symptoms through alcohol or other drugs. Sleep itself is feared for its capacity to bring on the repressed trauma.

However, not all oneirophobia is strictly a function of post-traumatic stress disorder, as most dream content, and thus the fear of its manifestation, is related to the daily functions of the unconscious. In traditional Freudian thought, the dreamer channels their thoughts, feelings, desires and fears through dreams, but in a disguised and nonrational way. When these dreams are recalled and experienced as disturbing events- especially if they are of frequent recurrence- the dreamer may begin to develop anxiety over the expression of their unconscious. Many sufferers may also be frightened by the unusual or surreal nature of dreams.

== In popular culture ==
- In Destiny 2: Lightfall, there is a music piece called Oneirophobia. This plays during the raid, Root of Nightmares, during the final boss fight with Nezarec, a character who uses nightmares and manipulates dreams as part of his attacks.
- In Rainbow Six Siege, there is a skin/customization option for operator Fenrir named Oneirophobia.
- In A Nightmare on Elm Street, a girl is treated for the condition by a psychiatrist.
- In Battle For Dream Island, the fifth season's tenth episode is titled "Oneirophobe's Nightmare" because it focuses on the contestants' dreams and references the character One.

== See also ==
- List of phobias
