= Traumatophobia =

Abnormal, pathological fear of having an injury

According to the DSM-IV classification of mental disorders, the injury phobia is a specific phobia of blood/injection/injury type. It is an abnormal, pathological fear of having an injury.

Another name for injury phobia is traumatophobia, from Greek τραῦμα (trauma), "wound, hurt" and φόβος (phobos), "fear". It is associated with BII (Blood-Injury-Injection) Phobia. Sufferers exhibit irrational or excessive anxiety and a desire to avoid specific feared objects and situations, to the point of avoiding potentially life-saving medical procedures. According to one study, it is most common in females.

What sets injury phobia apart is that it is when a person is exposed to blood, an injury, or an injection, they begin to experience extreme sensations of terror, such as breathlessness; excessive sweating; dry mouth; feeling sick; shaking; heart palpitations; inability to speak or think clearly; fear of dying, going mad, or losing control; a sensation of detachment from reality; or a full blown anxiety attack. Notably, dental phobia is distinct from traumatophobia.

The treatments that are available are mostly behavioral and cognitive therapies, the most common being behavioral. One method of behavioral therapy for traumatophobia is to expose the client to the stimuli, in this case being exposure to blood, injury, and injections, and repeat the process until the client’s reactions are less and/or cured. Hypnotherapy is also an option.

== See also ==
- List of phobias
