= Ornithophobia =

Irrational fear or dislike of birds

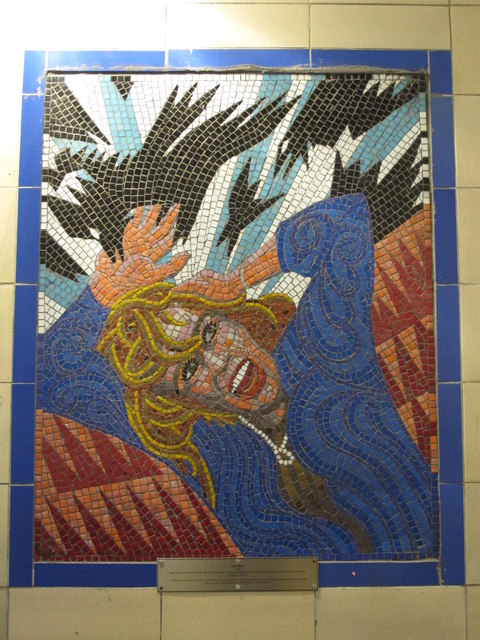
A mosaic in the London Underground depicting a woman being attacked by birds, based on the 1963 horror movie The Birds

Ornithophobia is the abnormal and irrational fear of birds, as well as a type of specific phobia. The term may also refer to strong dislike of birds. People with ornithophobia are often afraid of specific types of birds, for example chickens, ducks, and/or pest birds in grain-producing areas.

The prefix ornitho- signifies "of or pertaining to birds", from Ancient Greek ὄρνις (órnis, "bird").

Sufferers of this phobia may be afraid that they will be attacked by a bird or may simply be very uncomfortable around them. They would usually be afraid of their fluttering wings, the way they move, the way they fearlessly fly up to people waiting for food, the texture of the feathers, fear of disease or any combination of these. Birds can also be noisy, large and threatening, and may show little fear of humans.

The phobia itself causes heart palpitations, sweating, nervousness, and avoidance behavior in those who suffer from it. Without treatment, the phobia can become life-limiting. Fear of birds has been documented in movies and poetry.

== See also ==
- List of phobias
