= Tokophobia =

Fear of childbirth

- Other names: Tocophobia, maieusiophobia, parturiphobia
- Treatment: Counselling
- Frequency: ~14% of pregnant women

Tokophobia is a significant fear of childbirth. It is a common reason why some women request an elective cesarean section. Factors often include a fear of pain, death, unexpected problems, injury to the baby, sexual problems and a lack of self-confidence in the ability to give birth to a child. Treatment may occur via counselling.

It is a type of specific phobia. In 2000, an article published in the British Journal of Psychiatry described tokophobia as a psychological disorder that has received little attention and may be overlooked.

== Signs and symptoms ==
As is the case with any phobia, tokophobia can manifest itself through a number of symptoms including nightmares, difficulty in concentrating on work or family activities, panic attacks and psychosomatic complaints. Tokophobia often motivates a request for an elective caesarean section. Fear of labour pain is strongly associated with the fear of pain in general; a previous complicated childbirth, or inadequate pain relief, may cause the phobia to develop.

Tokophobia is a distressing psychological disorder which may be overlooked by medical professionals; as well as specific phobias and anxiety disorders, tokophobia may be associated with depression and post-traumatic stress disorder. Recognition of tokophobia and close liaison with obstetricians or other medical specialists can help to reduce its severity and ensure efficient treatment. Perinatal psychologists emphasise the importance of listening, validating, exploring, and tailoring interventions, as well as multiprofessional engagement and cooperation in treating tokophobia.

== Cause ==
Reasons for tokophobia can be complex, and are associated with a lack of social support, and with stress, depression and anxiety.

== Risks ==
Unaddressed tokophobia may lead to a prolonged labour and complications during childbirth. Tokophobia is also associated with postpartum depression and post-traumatic stress disorder (PTSD).

== Terminology ==
The term tokophobia was introduced in the medical literature in 2000. The word is from the Greek tokos, meaning childbirth and phobos, meaning fear.

It is also known as "maieusiophobia" (though this is certainly a variant of "maieusiophobia", from the Greek "maieusis", literally meaning "delivery of a woman in childbirth" but referring generally to midwifery), "parturiphobia" (from Latin parturire, meaning "to be pregnant"), and "lockiophobia".

== See also ==
- Anxiety disorder
- List of phobias
- Blood-injection-injury type phobia
- Psychiatric disorders of childbirth
