= Algophobia =

Fear of pain

Algophobia or algiophobia is a phobia of pain – an abnormal and persistent fear of pain that is far more powerful than that of a normal person. It can be treated with behavioral therapy and anti-anxiety medication. The term comes from Ancient Greek ἄλγος (álgos) 'pain' and φόβος (phóbos) 'fear'.

== Overview ==
According to Sabino Metta, a behavioral psychologist, the phobic reaction is a learned behavior. A common example of this reaction would be an elderly person who hears about all of their friends' various ailments and pains. This person will begin to anticipate the problems and experience the results before anything actually happens to them. People with this problem probably have hyperalgesia.

The Fear of Pain Questionnaire (currently the FPQ-III), a mental health screening tool, has been used to test for algophobia in the past and was found to have good internal consistency and test-retest reliability.

== See also ==
- Dental phobia
- List of phobias
