= Fear of frogs =

Specific phobia towards frogs

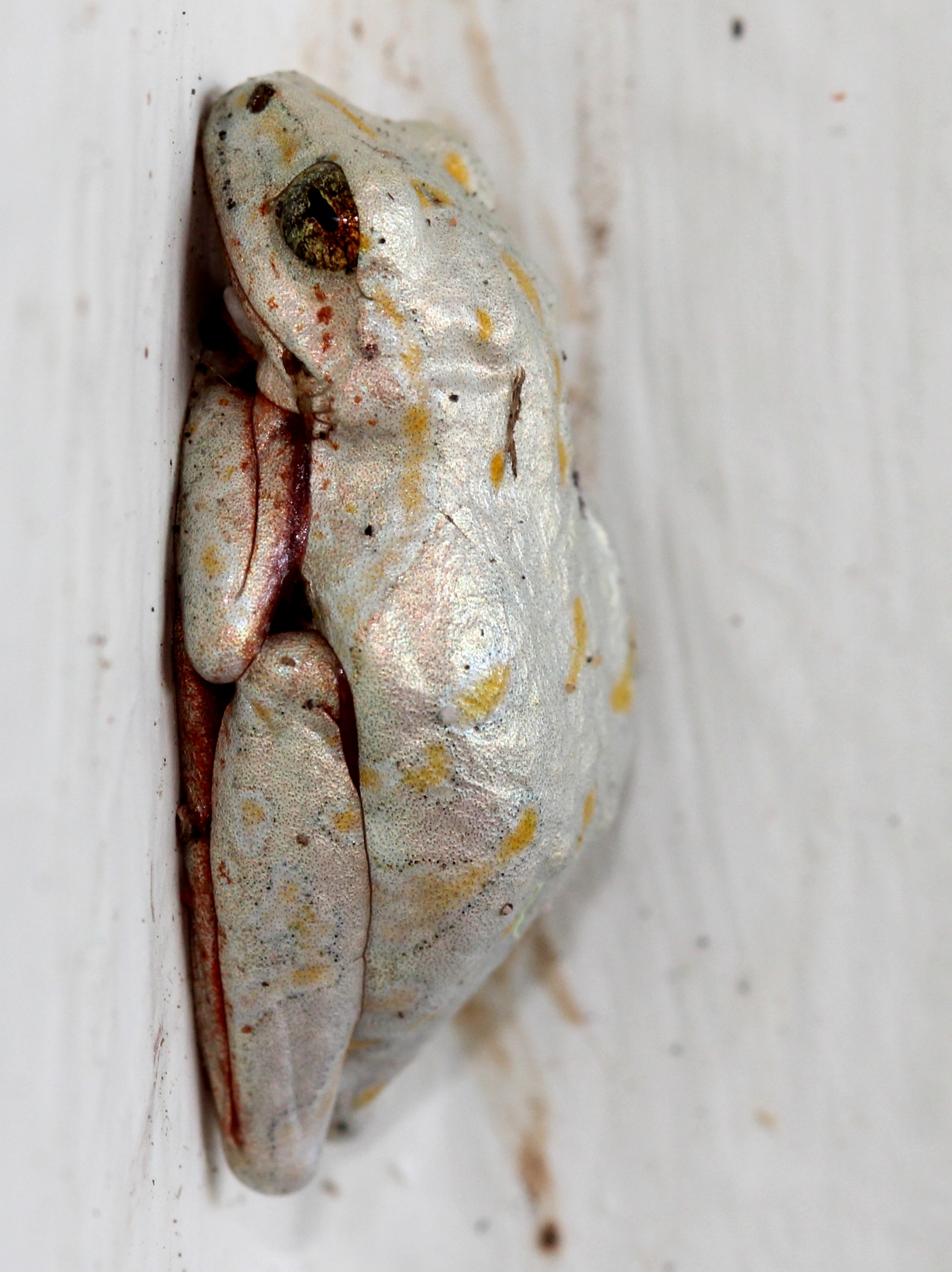
A painted reed frog (Hyperolius marmoratus)

Fear of frogs and toads is both a specific phobia, known simply as frog phobia or ranidaphobia (from Ranidae, the most widespread family of frogs), and a superstition common to the folkways of many cultures. Psychiatric specialty literature uses the simple term "fear of frogs" rather than any specialized term. The term batrachophobia (fear of amphibians) has also been recorded in a 1953 psychiatric dictionary.

== Cultural beliefs ==
Some cultures accord the sight of a frog as a bad omen. Other cultures regard the sight as a good omen. Portuguese shopkeepers use ceramic frogs to deter Roma people, and also serve as a marker of anti-Romani prejudice.

A common myth says that to touch frogs and toads may give one warts. A survey carried out by researchers from the Johannesburg Zoo have shown that in modern times old superstitions play a less significant role and modern children are more concerned whether frogs are venomous or harmless.

== As a phobia ==
A phobia of frogs often begins after seeing frogs die violently. One case of severe fear of frogs has been described in Journal of Behavior Therapy and Experimental Psychiatry in 1983: a woman developed an extreme fear of frogs after a traumatic incident in which her lawn mower ran over a group of frogs and killed them.

== See also ==
- List of phobias
