= Medication phobia =

- Other names: Pharmacophobia
- Specialty: Psychiatry, clinical psychology

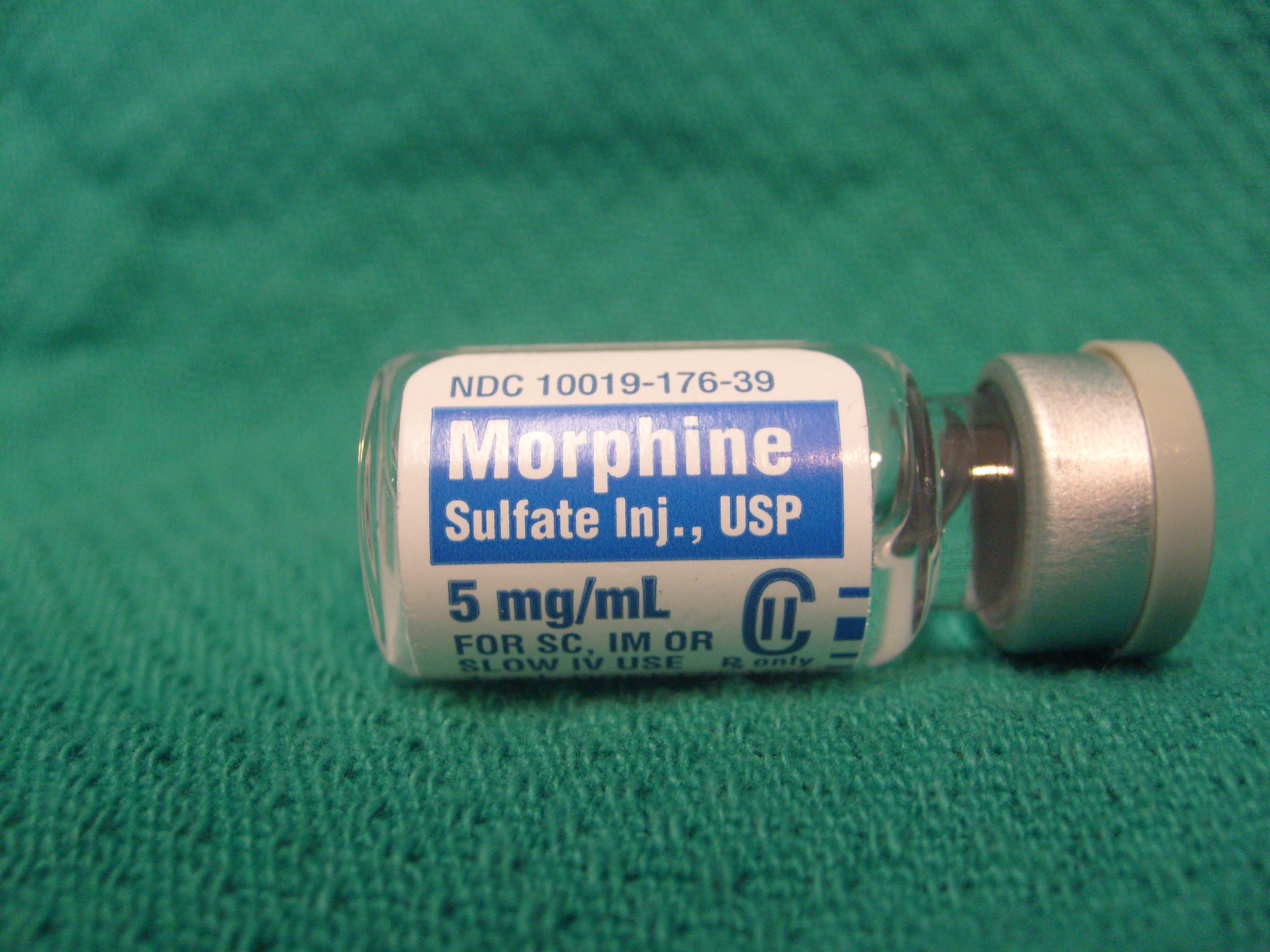
5mg/ml vial of Morphine Sulfate.

Medication phobia, also known as pharmacophobia, is a fear of the use of pharmacological treatments and a negative view of drugs in general. In severe, excessive and irrational cases it may be a type of specific phobia.

While lack of awareness by patient or doctor of adverse drug effects can have serious consequences, and having reservations about the use of drugs with abuse potential may be healthy, having a phobia of medications can have serious detrimental effects on patient health, for example refusal of necessary pharmacological interventions. Medication phobia can also lead to problems with medication compliance. Medication phobia can also present in parents who are concerned about giving medications to their children, fearing that the medications will do more harm than good. Medication phobia can be triggered by unpleasant adverse reactions to medications which are sometimes prescribed inappropriately or at excessive doses. Lack of awareness of the patient's predisposition to adverse effects (e.g. anxious patients and the elderly) and failure to attribute the adverse effects to the drug serves to compound the phobia. Starting at low doses and slowly increasing the medication dosage can avoid medication phobia secondary to adverse effects from developing.

Fears of medication use is also prevalent in people who have experienced unpleasant withdrawal effects from psychotropic drugs. Sometimes patients wrongly associate symptoms of an acute disease or illness with medications used to treat the disease or illness. This form of pharmacophobia can be treated by attempting to convince the patient to take test doses of the drug or another drug in the same drug class to prove to the patient that the symptoms were not due to the drug but due to the illness the drug was taken to treat.

== See also ==
- List of phobias
- Phobia
- Specific phobia
