= Sunday scaries =

Anxiety about the start of the working week

Sunday scaries, also known as the Sunday syndrome, Sunday blues, Sunday night dread or Sunday evening feeling, refer to anticipatory anxiety and dread that may occur on Sundays for students and employees as the weekend ends, and the workweek resumes on Monday. This feeling may arise from avoidance motivation stress of mental preparation for the upcoming week's workload through the Zeigarnik effect, processing the prior week's workload, and the challenge of maintaining work–life balance.

The term Sunday scaries was added to the Merriam-Webster Dictionary in 2026. This term has been in use since at least the late 2000s, but its origin is unknown.

== See also ==
- Critique of work
- Ergophobia
- Four-day workweek
