= Bibliophobia =

Fear or hatred of books

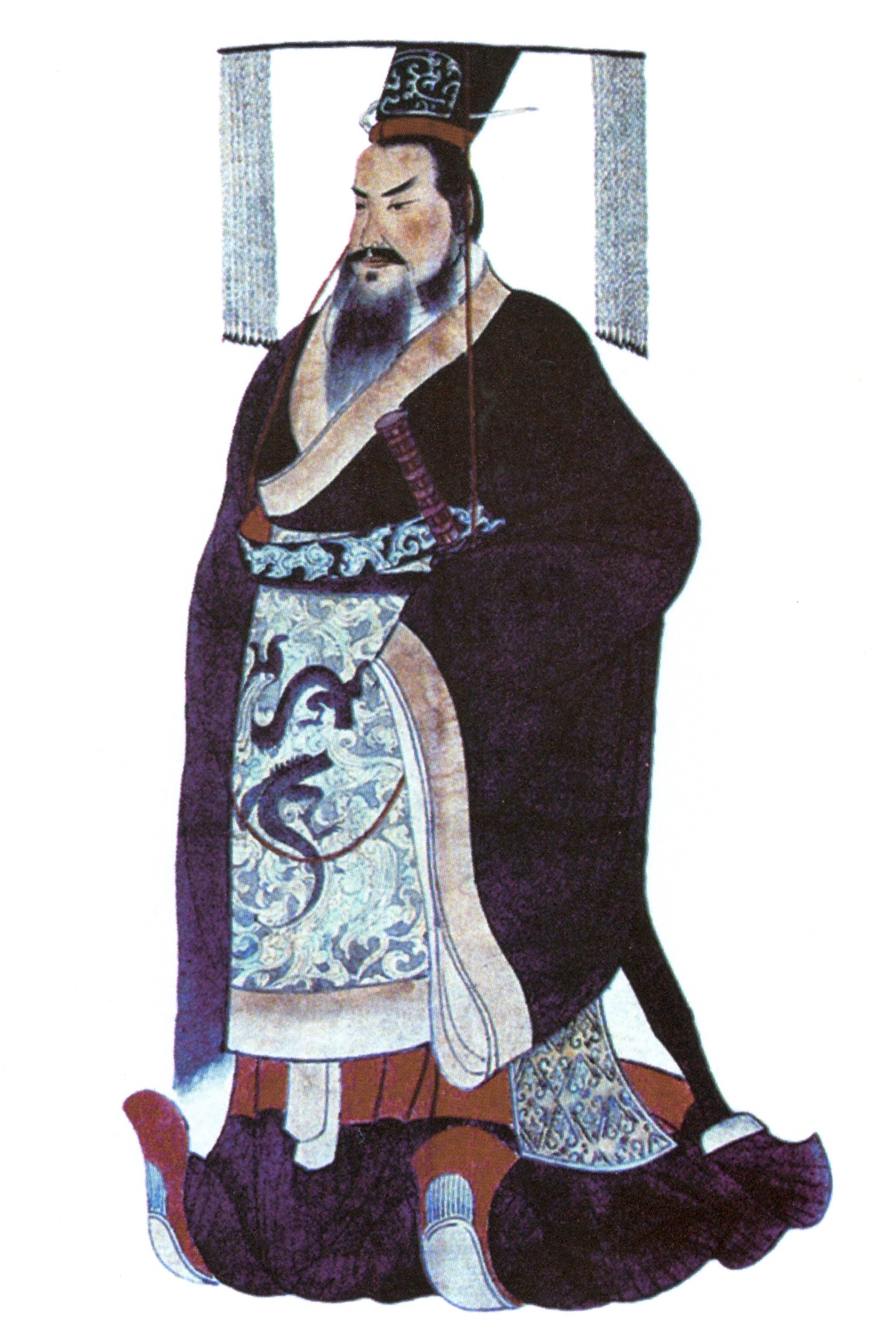
Qin Shi Huang, the first Chinese emperor, ordered a mass destruction of books for fear of the Confucian ideas that they contained.

Bibliophobia is the fear or hatred of books. It is a term with two related but distinct meanings. In psychology and psychiatry, it refers to an irrational and persistent fear of books or reading -- a specific phobia classified under anxiety disorders. More broadly, in cultural and historical usage, the term describes a fear or hatred of the influence books may have on society or culture, which has historically motivated censorship and book burning.

Bibliophobia is the antonym of bibliophilia, the love of books. The word derives from the Greek biblion (βιβλίον), meaning "book", and phobos (φόβος), meaning "fear".

== History and cultural usage ==
The term bibliophobia in its cultural sense -- referring to a fear of the power or influence of books -- has a long history. An early use appears in Thomas Frognall Dibdin's 1832 work Bibliophobia, which described a decline in enthusiasm for rare book collecting.

In his 1999 Matthews lecture at Birkbeck College, Tom Shippey discussed bibliophobia in the Middle Ages. This arose when the literate professions, such as the clergy and beadles, would exploit and terrify the illiterate masses by their command of texts such as religious and legal documents. He illustrated this with examples from Medieval English literature such as The Pardoner's Tale.

In this broader cultural sense, bibliophobia has been invoked as a motive for censorship and book burning across many historical periods and political systems, from the Nazi book burnings of the 1930s to modern censorship in US school libraries.

In Sarah Chihaya's 2025 Pulitzer Prize-nominated memoir Bibliophobia, her "life ruiner" was Toni Morrison's The Bluest Eye that exposed her deep feelings of being a Japanese-American in a pre-dominantly white suburb at Cleveland during her high school years.

A notable example of bibliophobia portrayed in popular culture is the 1953 dystopian novel Fahrenheit 451 by Ray Bradbury.

== See also ==
- List of banned books
- Death of the novel
- Specific phobia
- Censorship
- Dyslexia
- Spanish Inquisition book censorship
- Index Librorum Prohibitorum
