= Childhood phobia =

Exaggerated, intense fear found in children

- Specialty: Psychology

A childhood phobia is an exaggerated, intense fear "that is out of proportion to any real fear" found in children. It is often characterized by a preoccupation with a particular object, class of objects, or situation that one fears. A phobic reaction is twofold—the first part being the "intense irrational fear" and the second part being "avoidance."

Children during their developmental stages experience fears. Fear is a natural part of self-preservation. Fears allow children to act with the necessary cautions to stay safe. According to Child and Adolescent Mental Health, "such fears vary in frequency, intensity, and duration; they tend to be mild, age-specific, and transitory." Fears can be a result of misperceptions. When a child perceives a threatening situation, their body experiences a fight or flight reaction. Children placed in new situations with unfamiliar objects are more likely to experience such reactions. These fears should be passing, a result of childhood development.

A childhood fear develops into a childhood phobia when it begins to interfere with daily living. "Acute states of fear can elicit counterproductive physiological reactions such as trembling, profuse perspiration, faint feelings, weakness in joints and muscles, nausea, diarrhea, and disturbances in motor coordination" It is not uncommon for frightened or anxious children to regress in a phase of development. For example, a kindergartener might begin to baby talk or wet the bed when faced with a threatening or particularly frightening situation. Childhood phobias exist in many different varieties and intensities and have a wide range from tolerable to incapacitating.

== Fear or phobia ==
The distinction between "normal" fears and phobias, a phobia (as defined by the fourth edition of the Diagnostic and Statistical Manual of Mental Disorders (DSM-IV)):

- An irrepressible persistent fear of an object, activity or situation esp. when the subject is exposed to unfamiliar people or possible criticism. In children, the subject needs to be able to show a capacity for normal social reactions for their developmental stage, and when reactions occur they should happen among their peer group as well as with adults.
- Any exposure to the object or situation causes some form of unrestrained anxiety. In children this may be revealed by tantrums, crying, hysteria, or freezing.
- The fear reaction is excessive and unwarranted. Note: adults who suffer from anxiety disorders usually accept that their fear reaction was disproportionate to the situation; however, children may not have the cognitive abilities to make this realization depending on age and maturity.
- The situation is avoided or endured with large amounts of stress and anxiety.
- The fear reaction interferes with a normal routine e.g. if a fear of elevators cause a person to avoid taller buildings.
- The duration is at least 6 months.
- The origin of the fear reaction is not directly caused by the physiological effects of a drug or substance or origin of anxiety is not better classified by another disorder e.g. separation anxiety disorder.
- If another mental or medical condition is present, it is unrelated to the origin of the fear reaction.
- According to the Boston Children's Hospital a phobia is a type of anxiety disorder, that happens mostly with children and can be related to diverse reasons, they can happen due to biological, family and environmental factors those factors can be triggered through many different reasons, they can be inherited or associated with random or fixed events.

== Types ==
=== Fear of abandonment ===
From infancy, a child can feel whether or not their mother cares for them. As a child grows and develops, they will need continued guidance until they reach adulthood. When a child's discipline is directed at them instead of their misbehavior, the child feels as if their relationship with their parents is at risk. Phrases like "Ugh, you're killing me," "I'll give you up for adoption," or "I could just kill myself" are especially harmful. These phrases can make the child unstable and overly anxious when left alone. The children perceive that they are unloved and blame themselves for the rejection.

=== Fear of animals ===
The fear of animals most often occurs in the third year of life. In some cases, the fear has logical origins such as a traumatic experience with a large seemingly furious dog. In others, however, the fear is less rational. When a child fears small seemingly harmless animals like bunny rabbits and kittens, it is often due to the child relating the animal to something "scary" they have seen elsewhere.

=== Fear of darkness ===
One of the first fears that a child can acquire is a fear of darkness. Because a child lacks the coordination and knowledge of an adult they often allow themselves to imagine goblins, ghosts and monsters hidden in the depths of darkness surrounding them.

=== Fear of strangers ===
The fear of strangers develops within the first six to ten months. It is characterized by crying or whimpering when introduced to unfamiliar people.

=== Nightmares ===
Nightmares "represent the fulfillment of forbidden, repressed, or rejected wishes." Dreams may consist of aggressive monsters, sexual stirrings, or something unexpected.

== Cause ==
Though some fears are inborn, the majority are learned. Phobias develop through negative experiences and through observation. One way children begin to develop fears is by witnessing or hearing about dangers. Ollendick proposes while some phobias may originate from a single traumatizing experience, others may be caused by simpler, or less dramatic, origins such as observing another child's phobic reaction or through the exposure to media that introduces phobias.

In a study reported by Child and Adolescent Mental Health, parents filled out a questionnaire regarding common origins of phobias. In this study of 50 hydrophobic children around the mean age of 5½ the results were as follows:

- 2% of parents linked their child's phobia to a direct conditioning episode.
- 26% of parents linked their child's phobia to a vicarious conditioning episodes.
- 56% of parents linked their child's phobia to their child's very first contact with water
- 16% of parents could not directly link their child's phobia

In addition to asking about the origins of a child's fear, the questionnaire asked if parents believed that "information associated with adverse consequences was the most influential factor in the development of their child"s phobia." The results were:

- 0% of parents thought it was the most influential factor
- 14% of parents thought it was somewhat influential
- 86% of parents thought it had little to no influence

== Treatment ==
Phobias are irrational; they cannot be reasoned away. In the case of most phobias, a qualified councilor or trained psychologist is needed to help a child overcome their phobia. Cognitive behavioural therapy is routinely used to treat phobias in the UK over several sessions. Research has shown that a single session of cognitive behavioural therapy is as effective as multiple sessions, and is cheaper.

There are, however, a few things that may help a child overcome their fears. Parents or guardians should be supportive and encouraging to help their children overcome fears. Children should not be pushed to face their fears prematurely.

== Epidemiology ==
According to Child and Adolescent Mental Health, approximately 5% of children suffer from specific phobias and 15% seek treatment for anxiety-related problems. In recent years the number of children with clinically diagnosed phobias has gradually increased. Researchers are finding that the majority of these diagnoses come anxiety related phobias or social phobias
