= Autophobia =

Specific phobia of isolation

- Other names: Monophobia, isolophobia, eremophobia
- Drawing depicting a person who has autophobia
- Specialty: Psychology

Autophobia is the specific phobia or a morbid fear or dread of oneself or of being alone, isolated, abandoned, and ignored. This condition is associated with the idea of being alone, often causing severe anxiety.

While autophobia is not recognized as its own individual phobic disorder in major mental health diagnostic publications, it is still a disorder that may be treated like any other anxiety-based disorder through the use of medications and therapies. This disorder may, however, be classified and diagnosed as code 6B03 "specific phobia" in the ICD-11 and a situational type specific phobia [300.29 (F40.248)] in the DSM-5.

Those with this condition suffer in a range of situations, both in solitude and in company of others. Isolated, people with autophobia struggle with a fear of inability to handle challenges by themselves. On the other hand, those with this condition may still struggle in fear of abandonment and maintaining relationships even when those they are in relationships with are physically present.

Contrary to what would be inferred by a literal reading of the term, autophobia does not describe a "fear of oneself" nor is it the fear of automobiles (despite various cultures abbreviating automobile to "auto"). It typically develops from and is associated with personal trauma, anxiety, depression or other disorders.

Autophobia can be associated with or accompanied by other phobias, such as agoraphobia, and is generally considered part of the agoraphobic cluster, meaning that it has many of the same characteristics as certain anxiety disorders and hyperventilation disorders and may be present in a comorbid state with these disorders, although it can stand alone. The main concern of people with phobias in the agoraphobic cluster is their ability to get help in case of emergency. This often makes them afraid of going out in public, being caught in crowds, being alone, or being stranded.

Autophobia is not to be confused with agoraphobia (fear of being in public or being caught in crowds), self-hatred, or social anxiety, although it can be closely related to them. It is a distinct phobia that tends to be accompanied or linked with other anxiety disorders, trauma syndromes, mental health issues or phobias.

== Signs and symptoms ==
Autophobia signs and symptoms differ from one case to another. However, many individuals suffering from this condition exhibit a variety of common symptoms. One of the most known indications of autophobia is experiencing an intense amount of apprehension and anxiety when alone or contemplating situations where isolation from trusted others is imminent. People with this disorder also commonly believe that there is an impending disaster waiting to occur whenever they are left alone. For this reason, autophobes go to extreme lengths to avoid being in isolation. However, people with this disease often do not need to be in physical isolation to feel abandoned. Autophobes will often be in a crowded area or group of people and feel as though they are completely secluded.

There has also been some connection to autophobia being diagnosed in people who also have borderline personality disorders.

Below is a list of other symptoms that are sometimes associated with autophobia:

- Mental symptoms:
  - Fear of fainting
  - An inability to concentrate on anything other than the phobia
  - Fear of losing your mind
  - Failure to think clearly
- Emotional symptoms:
  - Stress over up-coming times and places where you may be alone
  - Fear of being secluded
- Physical symptoms:
  - Lightheadedness, dizziness
  - Sweating
  - Shaking
  - Nausea
  - Cold and hot flashes
  - Numbness or tingling feelings
  - Dry mouth
  - Increased heart rate
  - Not moving when isolated
  - Shaking hands and legs

== Background ==
Autophobia can be derived from social anxiety. When people with this phobia are left alone, they will often experience panic attacks, which is a common reaction in those with social anxiety. This disease can also stem from depression because when people become seriously autophobic, they start to find certain tasks and activities almost impossible to complete. This usually occurs when autophobes are faced with a possibility of going into a public place where there are many people or simply a place that is uncomfortable or unfamiliar to them. This phobia can also be closely related to agoraphobia, which leads to lowered self-confidence and uncertainty of their ability to finish certain activities that need to be done alone. People with this phobia tend to imagine the worst possible scenario. For example, they might have a panic attack and then think that they are going to die from this event.

Another experience that doctors believe leads individuals to develop this phobia is children being abandoned, usually by their parents, when they are very young. This first causes childhood trauma that then persists to affect them as they grow up. This turns into autophobia because they are now afraid that all of the important people in their lives are going to leave or abandon them. Therefore, this particular phobia can come from behavior and experiences that these people have had when they were growing up. However, abandonment does not necessarily mean being left alone physically, this also includes being isolated financially or emotionally. Having drastic, life-altering experiences, particularly causes more trauma which makes this phobia worse. People that have very high anxiety and in this case are more "high strung," are more susceptible to this phobia.

Although this phobia is often developed at a young age, it can develop later in life as well. Individuals sometimes develop this fear with the death of a loved one or the ending of an important relationship. Autophobia can also be described as the fear of being without a specific person. Tragic events in a person's life may create this fear of being without one specific person, but this often will eventually progress into a fear of being secluded in general.

== Diagnosis ==
=== Definitions ===
Autophobia is closely related to monophobia, isolophobia, and eremophobia, however, it varies slightly in definition. According to the Merriam-Webster Medical Dictionary, eremophobia is a morbid fear of being isolated. In contrast, The Practitioner's Medical Dictionary defines autophobia as a morbid fear of solitude or one's self.

Individuals who are suspected to have this fear-based condition undergo psychological assessment from a mental health specialist. To rule out any physiological causes of the disorder, medical history is gathered. A situational phobia, autophobia must interfere with the individual's daily tasks or routines due to symptoms caused by the condition such as anxiety to be diagnosed as such.

== Treatments ==
Autophobia is a form of anxiety that can cause a minor to extreme feeling of danger or fear when alone. There is not a specific treatment to cure autophobia as it affects each person differently. Most people with the condition are treated with psychotherapy, including cognitive behavioral therapy (CBT) and exposure therapy in which the amount of time that they are alone is slowly increased. Medications may be utilized for the stabilization of a patient's anxiety. These medications include (but are not limited to) beta blockers, anti-anxiety and depression medications called selective serotonin reuptake inhibitors (SSRIs), and benzodiazepine sedatives.

It is not uncommon for affected people to be unaware that they have this disorder and to dismiss the idea of seeking help. In many cases, patients will instead self medicate with alcohol and/or drugs and other medications. Often, the effects of these coping mechanisms end up worsening a person's anxiety, and the situation can get increasingly worse with time. Patients who do seek treatment from medical professionals have reported alleviation from the anxious effects of this disorder.

In mild cases of autophobia, treatment can sometimes be very simple. Therapists recommend many different remedies to make patients feel as though they are not alone even when that is the case, such as listening to music when running errands alone or turning on the television when at home for background noise. Using noise to interrupt the silence of isolated situations can often be a great help for people with autophobia.

It is important to recognize that just because a person may experience nervousness while being alone at times does not mean that they have autophobia. Most people feel alone and secluded at times; this is not an unusual phenomenon. Only when the fear of being alone begins to interrupt how a person lives their daily life does the idea of being autophobic become a possibility.

== Research ==
In 1969, autophobia or monophobia was referred to as being very closely related to death anxiety, or a feeling of impending doom . A patient with autophobia may experience hyperventilation related to this death anxiety or anxiety related to fear of solitude to an intense degree, such that the patient may feel they are in danger of suffocating or dying due to this hyperventilation episode.

It is also noted that patients with death anxiety might also increase their inclination to a comorbid diagnosis of autophobia because these patients are so anxious about becoming seriously injured, finding themselves in dire or compromising situations and death that they become afraid of solitude. Autophobia-induced anxiety may occur along with other anxieties or phobias included in the agoraphobic cluster, often due to this fear of isolation during a time when they may be in need of assistance.

== See also ==
- Agoraphobia (fear of large crowds)
- Borderline personality disorder
- Dependent personality disorder
- Narcissism
