= Acidophobe =

Organism intolerant to acidic environments

An acidophobe is an organism that is intolerant of acidic environments. The terms acidophobia, acidophoby and acidophobic are also used. The term acidophobe is variously applied to plants, bacteria, protozoa, animals, chemical compounds, etc. The antonymous term is acidophile.

Plants are known to be well-defined with respect to their pH tolerance, and only a small number of species thrive well under a broad range of acidity. Therefore the categorization acidophile/acidophobe is well-defined. Sometimes a complementary classification is used (calcicole/calcifuge, with calcicoles being "lime-loving" plants). In gardening, soil pH is a measure of acidity or alkalinity of soil, with pH = 7 indicating the neutral soil. Therefore acydophobes would prefer pH above 7. Acid intolerance of plants may be mitigated by lime addition and by calcium and nitrogen fertilizers.

Acidophobic species are used as a natural instrument of monitoring the degree of acidifying contamination of soil and watercourses. For example, when monitoring vegetation, a decrease of acidophobic species would be indicative of acid rain increase in the area. A similar approach is used with aquatic species.

== Acidophobes ==
- Whiteworms (Enchytraeus albidus), a popular live food for aquarists, are acidophobes.
- Acidophobic compounds are the ones which are unstable in acidic media.
- Acidophobic crops: alfalfa, clover
