= Thermophobia =

Intolerance for high temperatures

Thermophobia (adjective: thermophobic) is intolerance for high temperatures by either inorganic materials or organisms. The term has a number of specific usages.

In pharmacy, a thermophobic foam consisting of 0.1% betamethasone valerate was found to be at least as effective as conventional remedies for treating dandruff. In addition, the foam is non-greasy and does not irritate the scalp. Another use of thermophobic material is in treating hyperhydrosis of the axilla and the palm: A thermophobic foam named Bettamousse developed by Mipharm, an Italian company, was found to treat hyperhydrosis effectively.

In biology, some bacteria are thermophobic, such as mycobacterium leprae which causes leprosy. Thermophobic response in living organisms is negative response to higher temperatures.

In physics, thermophobia is motion of particles in mixtures (solutions, suspensions, etc.) towards the areas of lower temperatures, a particular case of thermophoresis.

In medicine, thermophobia refers to a sensory dysfunction, sensation of abnormal heat, which may be associated with, e.g., hyperthyroidism.

== See also ==
- Heat intolerance
