= Philophobia (fear) =

Fear of falling in love

Philophobia (from Greek "φιλέω-φιλώ" (love) and "φοβία" (phobia)) is the fear of falling in love. Philophobia usually occurs after a person has confronted any emotional turmoil relating to love, but it can also be a chronic phobia. It can also evolve out of religious and cultural beliefs that prohibit love. Philophobia can affect the quality of life and pushes a person away from commitment. A negative aspect of this fear of being in love or falling in love is that it keeps a person in solitude. It represents certain guilt and frustration towards the reaction coming from inside. Philophobia is not included in the DSM-5.
