= Mysophobia =

Pathological fear of contamination and germs

- Other names: Germophobia
- Specialty: Psychology

Mysophobia (from Ancient Greek μύσος [músos], meaning 'pollution', and φόβος [phóbos], meaning 'fear'), also known as verminophobia, germophobia, germaphobia, bacillophobia and bacteriophobia, is a pathological fear of contamination and germs. It is classified as a type of specific phobia, meaning it is evaluated and diagnosed based on the experience of high levels of fear and anxiety beyond what is reasonable when exposed to or in anticipation of exposure to stimuli related to the particular concept (in this case germs or contamination). William A. Hammond coined the term in 1879 when describing a case of obsessive–compulsive disorder (OCD) exhibited in repeatedly washing one's hands.

Common symptoms associated with mysophobia include abnormal behaviours such as excessive handwashing, wearing gloves or covering commonly used items to prevent contamination (without due reason), and avoiding social interaction or public spaces to avoid exposure to germs. Physical symptoms include common symptoms of anxiety such as light-headedness, rapid heartbeat, sweating, and/or shaking in the presence of germs/contamination.

Like many specific phobias, the exact causes of mysophobia are unknown. Both genetic and environmental factors may play a role. The classical conditioning model posits that specific phobias are formed when an otherwise neutral event occurs simultaneously with a traumatic one, creating a long-term emotional association between the neutral subject and negative emotions, including fear and anxiety. Research has demonstrated an association between mysophobia and diagnosis of other mental disorders. Other research has suggested that mysophobia is associated with poor understanding of microbes and a lack of time spent in nature.

Treatment options for mysophobia include therapies such as cognitive-behavioural therapy (CBT) to gain control on the thought processes regarding the phobia, and exposure therapy which involves repeatedly exposing the patient to the specific object of the phobia to habituate them and relieve anxiety. Pharmaceutical treatment options include the prescription of beta blockers and benzodiazepines to mitigate phobia-related panic attacks.

== Symptoms and diagnosis ==
People with mysophobia may display abnormal behaviours including:

- excessive hand-washing
- an avoidance of locations that might contain a high presence of germs
- a fear of physical contact, even with loved ones
- excessive effort dedicated to cleaning and sanitizing one's environment
- taking several showers daily
- sanitizing one's hands after any contact with an unknown surface
- severe anxiety when one is unable to clean or complete cleaning
- fear possessing interference of one's daily life, relationships, and functioning

In addition to the above abnormal behaviours, anxiety-related physical symptoms of mysophobia include:

- brain fog
- frequent crying
- increased irritability
- light-headedness
- rapid heartbeat
- restlessness
- sweating
- shortness of breath
- shaking
- dry mouth
- intrusive thoughts

As mysophobia is categorized under the umbrella of specific phobias in the DSM-V, the formal diagnosis of mysophobia is based on the presence of the following key features:

- a distinct association between the specific object/situation and negative emotions such as fear and anxiety
- the object/situation consistently produces fear and anxiety immediately upon exposure
- the fear and/or anxiety associated with the object/situation is unreasonable given the actual danger posed and the sociocultural context
- the object/situation is intentionally avoided or only endured with significant fear and anxiety
- the fear, and anxiety, and/or avoidance causes clinically significant distress or impedes proper functioning socially, occupationally, or otherwise
- the negative emotions or avoidance of the object/situation persists over time, typically for more than six months
- the above symptoms are not better explained by another mental disorder

== Epidemiology ==
Though there has been no formal evaluation of the prevalence of mysophobia in the general population, mysophobia has been associated with other anxiety disorders including OCD. One study conducted by Bajwa, Chaudhry, and Saeed has found an association between pre-diagnosed mental illness and higher rates of severe phobias including mysophobia in women. In another study, Robinson, Cameron, and Jorgensen argue that immune disorders may have become more common in recent times in part due to a lack of exposure to normal levels of dirt in the household among infants. This means that germaphobia has likely become more prevalent in the past few years, particularly with the COVID-19 pandemic.

As a specific phobia, the exact causes of mysophobia are unknown though many factors are thought to potentially contribute to the development of the condition. One commonly accepted theory known as the Classical Conditioning Model posits that specific phobias are formed when an otherwise neutral event occurs simultaneously with a traumatic one, creating a long-term emotional association between the neutral subject and negative emotions, including fear and anxiety. Robinson, Cameron, and Jorgensen found in their study associations between microbe literacy and time spent in nature with positive attitudes towards microbes, suggesting that a lack of the aforementioned factors might contribute to mysophobia.

== Treatment ==
Treatment for mysophobia typically includes therapy such as cognitive-behavioural therapy (CBT), which involves gaining control of cognitive process to reduce anxiety related to the phobia, or exposure therapy, which helps people gradually confront and overcome their fear through gradually exposing the individual to their phobia to allow them to become habituated. General stress reduction techniques such as yoga and meditation are useful for reducing anxiety associated with mysophobia, though these are not meant to treat or cure mysophobia directly. Other therapeutic treatments for specific phobias include virtual therapy, hypnosis, family therapy, and supportive therapy, all of which aim to help the patient realize that the object of their phobia is not dangerous.

In terms of pharmaceutical treatments, beta-blockers and benzodiazepines may be prescribed in severe cases to mitigate panic attacks associated with mysophobia.

== Etymology ==
The term mysophobia comes from the Greek μύσος (mysos), "uncleanness" and φόβος (phobos), "fear".

== Society ==
Some well-known people who are reputed to have (or had) mysophobia include Adolf Hitler, Howard Stern, Nikola Tesla, Howard Hughes, Howie Mandel, Saddam Hussein, and Donald Trump.

== See also ==
- List of phobias
