= Dog appeasing pheromone =

Chemical compound mixture

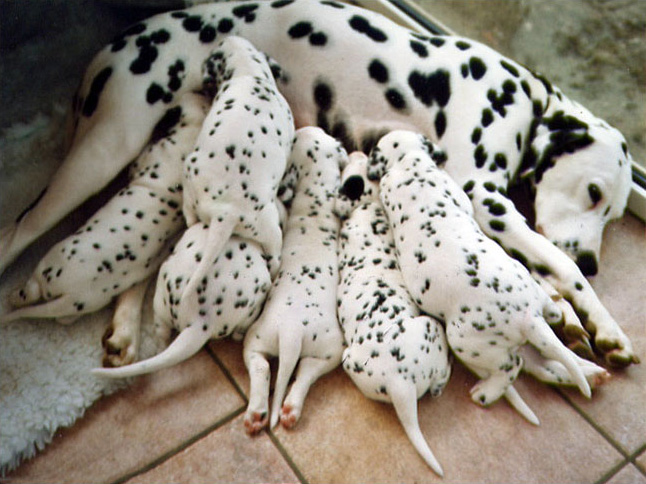
Dog appeasing pheromone is secreted by lactating dogs

Dog appeasing pheromone (DAP), sometimes known as apasine, is a mixture of esters of fatty acids released by the sebaceous glands in the inter-mammary sulcus of lactating female dogs. It is secreted from between three and four days after parturition and two to five days after weaning. DAP is believed to be detected by the vomeronasal organ (Jacobson's organ) and has an appeasing effect on both adults and pups, and assists in establishing a bond with the mother.

Synthetic DAP analogues have been developed which may support dogs during some, but not all, stressful situations.

== Synthetic analogue ==
Synthetic DAP analogues have been developed (e.g. "Adaptil"); however, there is mixed evidence for the efficacy of synthetic DAP in reducing stress-related behaviours.

Synthetic DAP can be effective at reducing stress-related behaviours in a number of contexts including puppies enrolled in socialization classes. A double-blind, placebo-controlled study found that newly adopted puppies aged 6 to 10 weeks cried less when exposed to synthetic DAP, but only in gun-dog breeds. It has been found to be highly effective in fear behaviours relating to sound sensitivity and fear of noises (e.g. fireworks and thunder).

Synthetic DAP is ineffective for dogs housed in long-term kenneling facilities and does not reduce soiling behaviour in newly adopted puppies.

In 2014, a critical review of studies on the use of synthetic DAP in veterinary hospital wards concluded that there was "little or no robust evidence" of it being effective in this environment.
