= Mageirocophobia =

Fear of cooking

- Specialty: Psychology

Mageirocophobia (pronunciation: /ˌmædʒaɪrɪkəfoʊbiə/) is the fear of cooking. It is spectral and can take on several forms, although it is not considered severe enough for treatment unless a person is severely afraid or impacted. Most frequently, it is a common social anxiety disorder caused by negative reactions to common culinary mishaps, post-traumatic stress episodes from cooking or the fear of others' cooking for the phobic person that either prevents them from eating, eating only pre-prepared foods and snacks, or causes them to eat food from eateries (there or as takeout) that can result in unhealthy diets associated with hypertension, obesity, and diabetes.

== Forms ==
The phobia can take on several forms but revolves around common themes:

=== Fear of spreading illness ===
The most common reason for some degree of this phobia is the fear of spreading foodborne illnesses, through either undercooked foods, improperly prepared or cleaned foods, or concern about understanding the basic rules for proper preparation and storage of foods.

=== Fear of the cooking process ===
Many mageirocophobes fear the process: cutting themselves, burning themselves, or even having problems executing the steps needed to successfully render a dish. Some see it as a chore that is overwhelming.

=== Fear of recipes ===
Another manifestation is the anxiety caused by reading recipes which can seem overwhelmingly complex, or of which the cook fears that they will not render faithfully because they might omit a critical step in the process, or might not be able to read between the lines of a process that is not documented well step-by-step. Another fear is of the sheer volume of recipes, which can leave the phobic person incapable of making a decision.

=== Fear of food knowledge ===
When we prepare food for ourselves or others, we become more aware of the ingredients, and, by doing so, the associated health benefits and/or risks of those foods and their consumption. Mageirocophobics can become obsessed with these issues which impacts their ability to cook or to appreciate the cooking of others.

=== Fear of food intake ===
Persons with eating disorders can become intimidated or fearful of cooking as it may lead to feelings of loss of self-control, inadequacy, or worry or guilt about triggers to their disorder.

== Symptoms ==
Symptoms of the phobia can include being light-headed, difficulty breathing, a tingling or numbness of some part of the body, fainting, weakness, dizziness, feelings of a loss of control, excessive sweating, chills, chest pain, nervous, or feeling a constant sense of dread or doom about cooking, or stubbornness or outright refusal to cook.

== Causes ==
Mageirocophobia can be caused by other personality traits, social anxieties, or disorders. It can be set off by high expectations from other family members, failures with cookbooks, or difficulties in performing successfully in a culinary course. It can also lead to other phobias and social disorders.

== Treatment ==
Education is the most common treatment, although psychotherapy, including cognitive-behavioral therapy, is indicated when the fear becomes so severe as to cause dysfunction for the phobic individual.

== Etymology ==
Mageirocophobia is derived from the classical Greek noun mágeiros (μάγειρος), which means chef or butcher.
