= Coprophobia =

Fear of feces or defecation

- Specialty: Psychology

Coprophobia is fear of or aversion to feces or defecation.

In humans, the attitude to feces and defecation has become a cultural taboo.

In the animal world, many herbivorous grazing animals including cows, sheep, horses, and reindeer avoid feces when feeding. Primates also prefer to forage away from feces-contaminated areas. The aversion is believed to be a strategy to avoid infection.
