= Basophobia =

Basophobia or basiphobia may refer to:

- Basophobia, fear associated with astasia-abasia or fear of walking/standing erect
- Basophobia, fear of falling
