= Anticipatory anxiety =

Fear in response to anticipated events

Anticipatory anxiety, sometimes called future tripping, describes a type of fear that occurs when an anticipated event in the future causes distress. These events can include both major occasions, such as a presentation, but depending on the individual could also happen before some minor event, like going out. It is not seen as a distinct type of anxiety but rather plays a part in many variations and can be found in numerous disorders and is strongly connected to panic attacks, often following them.

== Description ==
People who suffer from anticipatory anxiety can have a number of different symptoms. These can include being afraid of an event that will happen in the future and therefore presents an unpredictable threat to an individual, but can also include chest pains or hyperventilation. In some cases they can even make the person feel like they are dying or lose control.

Anticipatory anxiety does not have one definitive cause but rather it plays a part in many anxiety-related disorders. It can arise through social anxiety disorder and be a consequence of bullying. People who often suffer from panic attacks can grow to fear their onset and the repercussions that accompany them. This is then an anticipatory anxiety, as something that is anticipated for the future causes anxiety in an individual. It can come out stronger in a situation where a stress-causing event cannot be predicted.

Increased activity of the amygdala can lead to wrongfully processing threats, which could then be the reason for overly worrying about the future. The anterior insula causes emotional responses to predicted events. If activated too strongly, this can lead to threat-uncertainty.

== Symptoms ==
The symptoms of future tripping can overlap with multiple different anxiety disorders. The main symptom is an extensive fear of an imagined event or situation that lays in the future, which the person thinks of as an "unpredictable threat".

Other symptoms include:

- Palpitations
- Shortness of breath
- Nausea
- Dizziness
- Fear of dying, fainting, or losing control
- Feeling worried, tense, stressed, or irritable
- Feeling restless and unable to sit still
- Having trouble being present in the moment and focusing on simple tasks

A person suffering from anticipatory anxiety may also experience fear of having a panic attack. Symptoms include hyperventilation, chest pains, and muscle spasms.

== Causes ==
There are no known general direct causes to anticipatory anxiety. Personal sensitivity and probability of anxiety occurring may be elevated by various factors. A person's personality traits may put them at increased risk for anticipatory stress. People characterised as perfectionists have shown to be more vulnerable. Excessive deliberation or overthinking may be a direct cause of the symptoms of anticipatory anxiety. Some studies have shown correlation between stress level and one's perception of whether the stress inducing event is outside of one's control or if it can be affected or mitigated by them.

Anticipatory anxiety has higher chances of occurring in the context of situations where the result of stress-inducing events is unpredictable. Prior knowledge, anticipation, and understanding of potential consequences of the stressful event may significantly decrease the level of the anxiety.

There are indications of smoking increasing anxiety among people with high anxiety sensitivity.

The Sunday scaries are a common form of anticipatory anxiety.

=== Panic attacks ===
Anticipatory anxiety is a symptom of panic disorder, playing a role in its onset, maintenance and impairment. People who suffer from frequent spontaneous panic attacks might develop a persistent state of fear, or anxiety, relating to the anticipation of future panic attacks or their consequences. The severity of this anxiety might be modified by cues assumed to trigger panic attacks, including bodily symptoms. The freezing symptom, characteristic for panic disorder, is related to the lessened mobility associated with anticipatory anxiety.

The Panic and Agoraphobia Scale scores on the basis of five elements, including the frequency and severity of anticipatory anxiety. The severity of the anxiety serves as an indicator for avoidance behaviour in panic disorder and agoraphobia.

People experiencing anticipated fear of epileptic seizures may also fear anticipated panic attacks. This can culminate into anticipatory seizure anxiety, seizure phobia, or epileptic panic disorder.

=== Anxiety disorders ===
Anticipatory anxiety is a feature of social anxiety disorder. The Social Phobia Scale, a general self-report questionnaire used as measure for social anxiety disorder, contains the 'anticipatory anxiety related to being observed' as one of its main diagnostic items. Peer victimisation, such as bullying, may increase levels of anticipatory anxiety and of developing social anxiety disorder.

Avoidance behaviour associated with post-traumatic stress disorder increases anticipatory anxiety. This can be an indicator of post-traumatic anxiety disorders such as agoraphobia, social anxiety disorder, obsessive-compulsive disorder, or separation anxiety.

== Neuroanatomy ==
A wide network of brain areas are involved in anticipatory anxiety. The activity of the amygdala increases under conditions of uncertainty. The hyperactivity of the amygdala leads to increased vigilance and biased attention towards threat and deficient associative learning, which leads to higher expectancy of threat. These expectations cause a feedback loop where anxious individuals become increasingly more vigilant and attentive towards perceived threats. Increased attention influences the subjective value of potential future events. This value is assigned by the ventral striatum and orbitofrontal cortex, to which the amygdala is bidirectionally connected.

Dopaminergic neurons in the midbrain generate prediction error signals, which reflect a mismatch between the predicted and the actual outcome. These error signals lead to more accurate future predictions for both rewarding and aversive stimuli. Hypothetical future events create an anticipatory emotional response from the anterior insula. Hyperactivity of the anterior insula can be observed in anticipation of negative events connected to absent decision-making or threat uncertainty. Already associated neuronal connections strengthen when behavioural patterns and anxious thoughts occur.

The anterior midcingulate cortex is involved in the regulation of autonomic activity, direction of appropriate defensive responses, facilitation of response selection, and the increase of attentional resources. It projects to the motor cortex, amygdala, midbrain nuclei (including the periaqueductal grey), parietal regions and multiple medial and lateral prefrontal regions (including the dorsolateral prefrontal cortex). In clinical anxiety, the structure, function and connectivity of the anterior midcingulate cortex are altered.

== Treatment ==
Future tripping, another name for anticipatory anxiety, is a form of anxiety and therefore can be treated by a psychologist who can provide strategies to cope in a healthy manner.

A regular practice of meditation can help overcome the want to control and apprehend the future, as the practice includes being aware of the present moment. This technique reduces the persistence of anxious thoughts, limiting the impact.

Eating healthy food and exercising regularly have been shown to have a positive effect. Exercise releases stress from the body and can help distract from anxious thoughts.
