= Specific phobia =

Specific, irrational fears

- Specialty: Psychiatry, clinical psychology

Specific phobia is an anxiety disorder, characterized by an extreme, unreasonable, and irrational fear associated with a specific object, situation, or concept which poses little or no actual danger. Specific phobia can lead to avoidance of the object or situation, persistence of the fear, and significant distress or problems functioning associated with the fear. A phobia can be a fear of anything.

Although fears are common and normal, a phobia is an extreme type of fear where great lengths are taken to avoid being exposed to the particular danger. Phobias are considered the most common psychiatric disorder, affecting about 10% of the population in the US, according to the Diagnostic and Statistical Manual of Mental Disorders, Fifth Edition (DSM-5), (among children, 5%; among teens, 16%). About 75% of patients have more than one specific phobia.

It can be described as when patients are anxious about a particular situation. It causes a great load of difficulty in life. Patients have a lot of distress or interference when functioning in their daily life. Unreasonable or irrational fears get in the way of daily routines, work, and relationships due to the effort that a patient makes to avoid the terrifying feelings associated with the fear.

Females are twice as likely to be diagnosed as males with a specific phobia.

Children and adolescents who are diagnosed with a specific phobia are at an increased risk for additional psychopathology later in life.

== Signs and symptoms ==
Fear, discomfort or anxiety may be triggered both by the presence and the anticipation of the specific object or situation. The main behavioral sign of a specific phobia is avoidance. The fear or anxiety associated with specific phobia can also manifest in physical symptoms such as an increased heart rate, shortness of breath, muscle tension, sweating, or a desire to escape the situation.

== Causes ==
The exact cause of specific phobias is not known. The mechanisms for development of specific phobias can be distinguished between innate (genetic and neurobiological) factors, and learned factors.

In neurobiology, one explanation proposed for specific phobia is that the typical activation of the amygdala in response to stimuli may be exaggerated due to pathological changes. According to this theory, a deficiency in amygdala habituation may also contribute to the persistence of non-experiential phobia. Certain phobias that are less lethal (e.g. dogs) seem to be more frequently observed and easily acquired in comparison to potentially lethal fears which are more relevant to developed human society (e.g. cars and guns). This was theorised to be due to biological adaptation being passed through evolution which makes recent threats less prone to easy acquisition. However, a 2014 study found evidence against this evolutionary theory, which stated: "Our findings are inconsistent with the hypothesis that fears/phobias of individual stimuli result from genetic and environmental factors unique to that stimulus. Instead, we observed substantial sharing of risk factors across individual fears." There is also evidence for the validity of a genetic component contributing to blood-injection-injury phobias and animal phobias, although this evidence did not support the idea that other specific phobias had genetic influence. Blood-injection-injury phobias are also believed to be the most heritable among specific phobias.

The classical conditioning model of learning has also been used to suggest that a phobia will be learned when an event that causes a fear or anxiety reaction is paired with a neutral event. An example of this model is when being near a dog (neutral event) is paired with the emotional experience of being bitten by a dog, resulting in a chronic fear which is described as a specific phobia to dogs. An alternative proposed mechanism of association is through observational learning. According to this theory, a person may internalize another person's fears about a specific object or situation through observation of their reactions.

== Diagnosis ==
Diagnosis in the ICD or the DSM requires a marked fear, anxiety or avoidance that is long-lasting (greater than six months) and consistently occurs in the presence of the feared object or situation. The DSM-5 states that the fears should be out of proportion to the danger posed, compared to the ICD-10 which specifies that the symptoms must be excessive or unreasonable. Minor differences have persisted between the ICD-11 and DSM-5.

In the DSM-5, there are several types which specific phobia can be classified under:

- Animal type – Including fear of spiders (arachnophobia), insects (entomophobia), dogs (cynophobia), or snakes (ophidiophobia).
- Natural environment type – Including fear of water (aquaphobia), heights (acrophobia), lightning and thunderstorms (astraphobia), or aging (gerascophobia).
- Situational type – Including the fear of small, confined spaces (claustrophobia) or the dark (nyctophobia).
- Blood/injection/injury type – Including fear of medical procedures, including needles and injections (trypanophobia), fear of blood (hemophobia) and fear of getting injured (traumatophobia).
- Other – Situations which can lead to choking or vomiting, and children's fears of loud sounds or costumed characters.

Although the avoidance resulting from specific phobia is comparable to other anxiety disorders, differential diagnosis is done through examining underlying causes for the behavior. Agoraphobia is also considered distinct from specific phobia, along with substance use disorders, and avoidant personality disorder. The occurrence of panic attacks is not itself a symptom of specific phobias and falls under the criteria of panic disorder.

== Treatment ==
There are a variety of treatment options available for specific phobias, most of which focus on psychosocial interventions. Different psychological treatments have varying levels of effects depending on the specific phobia being addressed.

=== Cognitive behavioral therapy (CBT) ===
Cognitive behavioral therapy is a short term, skills-focused therapy that aims to help people diffuse unhelpful emotional responses by helping people consider them differently or change their behavior. CBT represents the gold standard and first line of therapy in specific phobias. CBT is effective in treating specific phobias primarily through exposure and cognitive strategies to overcome a person's anxiety. Computer-assisted treatment programs, self-help manuals, and delivery by a trained practitioner are all methods of accessing CBT. A single session of CBT in one of these modalities can be effective for individuals who have a specific phobia.

=== Exposure therapy ===
Exposure therapy is a particularly effective form of CBT for many specific phobias, however, treatment acceptance and high drop-out rates have been noted as concerns. In addition, a third of people who complete exposure therapy as a treatment for specific phobia may not respond, regardless of the type of exposure therapy. Other interventions have been successful for particular types of specific phobia, such as virtual reality exposure therapy (VRET) for spider, dental, and height phobias, applied muscle tension (AMT) for needle phobia, and psychoeducation with relaxation exercises for fear of childbirth. With exposure therapy, a type of cognitive-behavioural therapy, clinically significant improvement was experienced by up to 90% of patients. While very long-term outcomes remain unknown, many of the benefits of exposure therapy persisted after one year. Treatment may be more successful at reducing symptoms in people with low trait anxiety, high motivation, and high self-efficacy entering exposure therapy. In addition, high cortisol levels, high heart rate variation, evoking disgust, avoiding relaxation, focusing on cognitive changes, context variation, sleep, and memory-enhancing drugs can also reduce symptoms following exposure therapy.

Exposure can be "live"(in real life) or imaginal (in ones imagination) and can involve:

- Systematic desensitization—A therapy that exposes the person to increasing levels of vivid stimuli gradually and frequently, while instructed to relax.
- Flooding—A therapy that exposes the person with a specific phobia to the most fearful stimulus first (i.e. the most intense part of the phobia). Patients are at great risk for dropping out of treatment as this method repeatedly exposes the patient to the fear.
- Modeling—This method includes the clinician approaching the feared stimuli while the patient observes and tries to repeat the approach themselves.

Exposures that are imaginal are less effective.

Specifically for acrophobia, in-vivo exposure (exposure to real-world height-scenarios while maintaining anxiety at controlled levels) has been shown to significantly improve measures of anxiety in the short-term, but this effect decreased over a longer term. Likewise, virtual reality exposure was statistically significant in some measures of anxiety reduction, but not others.

=== Pharmacotherapeutics ===
As of late 2020, there is limited evidence for the use of pharmacotherapy in the treatment of specific phobia. Pharmacological treatments are typically used in combination with behaviorally-focused psychotherapy, as introducing pharmacological interventions independently may result in relapsing of symptoms. The selective serotonin re-uptake inhibitors (SSRIs), paroxetine and escitalopram, have shown preliminary efficacy in small randomized controlled clinical trials. However, these trials were too small to show any definitive benefits of anxiolytic medication alone in treating phobia. Benzodiazepines are occasionally used for acute symptom relief, but have not been shown to be effective for long-term treatment. There are some findings suggesting that adjuvant use of the NMDA receptor partial agonist, d-cycloserine, with virtual reality exposure therapy may improve specific phobia symptoms more than virtual reality exposure therapy alone. As of 2020, studies on the use of adjunct d-cycloserine are inconclusive.

== Prognosis ==
The majority of those that develop a specific phobia first experience symptoms in childhood. Often individuals will experience symptoms periodically with periods of remission before complete remission occurs. However, specific phobias that continue into adulthood are likely to experience a more chronic course. Specific phobias in older adults has been linked with a decrease in quality of life. Those with specific phobias are at an increased risk of suicide. Greater impairment is found in those that have multiple phobias. Response to treatment is relatively high but many do not seek treatment due to lack of access, ability to avoid phobia, or unwilling to face feared object for repeated CBT sessions.

== Epidemiology ==
Specific phobia is estimated to affect 6–12% of people at some point in their life. There may be a large amount of underreporting of specific phobias as many people do not seek treatment, with some surveys conducted in the US finding that 70% of the population reports having one or more unreasonable fears.

Specific phobias have a lifetime prevalence rate of 7.4% and a one-year prevalence of 5.5% according to data collected from 22 different countries. The usual age of onset is childhood to adolescence. During childhood and adolescence, the incidence of new specific phobias is much higher in females than males. The peak incidence for specific phobias amongst females occurs during reproduction and childrearing, possibly reflecting an evolutionary advantage. There is an additional peak in incidence, reaching nearly 1% per year, during old age in both men and women, possibly reflective of newly occurring physical conditions or adverse life events. The development of phobias varies with subtypes, with animal and blood injection phobias typically beginning in childhood (ages 5–12), whereas development of situational specific phobias (i.e., fear of flying) usually occurs in late adolescence and early adulthood.

In the US, the lifetime prevalence rate is 12.5% and a one-year prevalence rate of 9.1%. An estimated 12.5% of U.S. adults experience specific phobia at some time in their lives and the prevalence is approximately double in females compared to males. An estimated 19.3% of adolescents experience specific phobia, but the difference between males and females is not as pronounced.

== See also ==
- List of phobias
- Phobia
