= List of Welcome to Demon School! Iruma-kun episodes =

Welcome to Demon School! Iruma-kun is an anime series adapted from the manga series, written by Osamu Nishi. The series is directed by Makoto Moriwaki at Bandai Namco Pictures, with Kazuyuki Fudeyasu handling series composition, and Akimitsu Honma composing the music. The 23-episode anime series aired from October 5, 2019, to March 7, 2020, on NHK Educational TV. The opening theme is "Magical Babyrinth" performed by Da Pump, while the ending theme is "Debikyū" (デビきゅー) performed by Yu Serizawa. Crunchyroll is streaming the series. A second season aired from April 17 to September 11, 2021. The opening theme for the second season is "No! No! Satisfaction!" by Da Pump, while the ending theme is "Kokoro Show Time" (ココロショータイム) by Amatsuki. A third season aired from October 8, 2022, to March 4, 2023. The opening theme is "Girigiri Ride It Out" (ギリギリ Ride it out; lit. 'On the Edge Ride It Out') performed by Fantastics from Exile Tribe, while the ending theme is "Nabe Bugyо̄" (鍋奉行; lit. 'Hotpot Boss') performed by Wednesday Campanella. A fourth season aired from April 4 to September 27, 2026. The opening theme is "Ichi Ni no San" (一二三) by Penthouse and the ending theme is "Super Yusho Tune!" (すーぱー優勝ちゅーーん!) by Candy Tune.

== Series overview ==
Season	Episodes	Originally released	
Season	Episodes	First released	Last released
1	23	October 5, 2019	March 7, 2020
2	21	April 17, 2021	September 11, 2021
3	21	October 8, 2022	March 4, 2023
4	24	April 4, 2026	September 27, 2026

== Episode list ==
=== Season 1 (2019–20) ===
No. overall	No. in season	Title (Note: All English titles are taken from Crunchyroll.)	Original release date
1	1	"Iruma-kun from Demon School"; Transliteration: "Akuma gakkō no Iruma-kun" (Japanese: 悪魔学校の入間くん)	October 5, 2019
Iruma Suzuki, a fourteen-year-old Japanese boy incapable of refusing polite requests, works hard to support his scumbag parents. He is suddenly kidnapped to the Netherworld by the demon Sullivan after Iruma’s parents sold his soul. Sullivan wishes to adopt Iruma as his beloved grandson, since his friends always boast about their grandsons and he is jealous. Iruma reluctantly agrees and is enrolled in the Demon School, Babyls, where he must keep his human identity secret or risk being eaten by his classmates. Iruma attends the opening ceremony and learns Sullivan is the school's director. First Year Representative Asmodeus Alice tries to give his speech, but Sullivan makes Iruma do it instead. Iruma reads a speech provided by Sullivan, terrifying and impressing the students as the speech was actually a dangerous spell to prevent Iruma falling or embarrassing himself. Asmodeus challenges Iruma to a duel for insulting him but Iruma, having been raised by his scumbag parents who constantly put him in dangerous situations, has developed an almost superhuman ability to dodge attacks. The other students assume Iruma refuses to fight back because he considers Asmodeus weak. When a girl in the audience is almost hurt, Iruma saves her, but the effects of Sullivan's spell prevent him falling forwards and he accidentally knocks Asmodeus unconscious by throwing him backwards in a German Suplex. The story spreads throughout the school, making Iruma famous. Iruma is shocked when Asmodeus happily declares himself Iruma's servant. Sullivan is delighted Iruma seems to have a bright future in the Netherworld.
2	2	"Familiars Summoned!"; Transliteration: "Tsukaima, shōkan!" (Japanese: 使い魔、召喚!)	October 12, 2019
During breakfast with Sullivan, Iruma demonstrates his ability to consume truly shocking amounts of food. He tries to refuse to attend demon school but decides to go when Sullivan reveals he has bought even more thoughtful gifts for him. Asmodeus informs Iruma they must summon their magical familiars and the strength of the familiar will determine their demonic rank and which class they are placed in. Their advisor, Naberius Kalego, immediately dislikes Iruma for being Sullivan’s grandson. To summon a familiar, the students perform a ceremony using their blood on summoning parchments marked with Naberius' demonic seal to prevent cheating. Asmodeus summons a fire breathing Gorgon snake. Iruma tries a summoning but as he has no demonic power in his blood, the familiar summoning accidentally becomes a demon summoning using the power of Naberius' demonic seal, causing Naberius to be summoned as Iruma's familiar in the embarrassing form of a small, cute, fluffy owl with bat wings and horns. Despite it being an accident, the other students assume Iruma must be even more powerful than Naberius to be able to bind him as a familiar, thus increasing Iruma's fame even more. Sullivan happily informs them familiar summoning contracts are unbreakable and last an entire year. Naberius becomes bedridden from shock, and Iruma's rank is left undetermined. Iruma meets a hyperactive student named Valac Clara whom Asmodeus warns Iruma not to speak to.
3	3	"Iruma and Clara"; Transliteration: "Iruma to Kurara" (Japanese: 入間とクララ)	October 19, 2019
3	3	"Demon Friends"; Transliteration: "Akuma no Otomodachi" (Japanese: 悪魔のお友達)	October 19, 2019
Asmodeus explains Clara is a weirdo who people try to avoid. Clara becomes attached to Iruma who is compelled to play with her after she says "please". Clara reveals she possesses magical pockets which can copy any object she sees. Iruma learns other students have been manipulating Clara into creating free food for them. Clara sadly reveals she has gotten used to having to bribe people to be her friends. When she tries to bribe Iruma he refuses, upsetting her, until Iruma explains he wants to be her friend without bribes. This makes Clara so happy that when the other students try manipulating her again, she throws a drinks machine at them before using Asmodeus as a target for paint dodge ball. Iruma is unsure if Asmodeus and Clara are his friends since he never had friends before. Iruma learns a student's rank controls what food they can order. Clara gets in trouble with the snack stall owner who considers her replicating pockets a form of shoplifting. Naberius arrives to settle the matter only for Clara to trick Iruma into summoning Naberius, turning him back into an owl. Iruma, Clara, and Asmodeus flee while the stall owner traps Naberius and demands payment for the shoplifted items. Iruma asks Asmodeus and Clara if they are his friends but is surprised to learn demons have no concept of "friends", but they agree to be friends anyway. Sullivan holds a faculty meeting where it is decided Iruma, Clara, and Asmodeus will all be placed in the Misfit Class for Problem Children.
4	4	"The Misfit Class"; Transliteration: "Abunōmaru Kurasu" (Japanese: 問題児(アブノーマル)クラス)	October 26, 2019
Sullivan reveals to Iruma he put him in a class of troublemakers to help him not stand out, along with Asmodeus and Clara so he wouldn't be alone. Iruma immediately runs afoul of booby traps set by his new classmates who wagered on whether he would survive. Iruma meets Sabnock Sabro, a tall muscular delinquent who plans on becoming the next Demon King. Iruma learns there are ten demonic ranks, with Yodh, or 10th Rank, being strongest, and the Demon King is always chosen from among the Yodh. Sabnock admits he was placed in the Misfit Class for trying to fight a teacher. Naberius arrives and sets them a task to determine their ranks, a race through a dangerous valley, though Naberius warns them to avoid the guardian beast that is in a particularly foul mood. Most students opt to fly, except for Iruma who has no demon wings and simply falls off the cliff when pushed by an impatient Naberius. Sabnock flies straight for the guardian, hoping to defeat it and get a high rank. Iruma is carried off by demonic crows that accidentally drop him in the guardian's nest with its baby, who is injured. Iruma tries to help the baby and discovers his human blood can heal demon's injuries instantly. The grateful baby decides to fly Iruma to the flag as a thank you. Elsewhere, Sabnock admits he made a mistake trying to defeat the guardian as it easily overpowers him.
5	5	"The One Who Wants to Be Demon King"; Transliteration: "Maō wo mezasu mono" (Japanese: 魔王を目指す者)	November 2, 2019
Sabnock reveals he wants to become Demon King to prove himself better than his pacifist older brother. Iruma suddenly lands in front of him, pacifying the guardian by showing its child is healed. Sabnock assumes Iruma is somehow powerful enough not to be afraid of the guardian. At the finish line, Asmodeus places first and Clara, riding on Asmodeus' shoulders, comes second. Iruma and Sabnock end up in last despite riding on the guardian's back. Naberius explains a Rank Owl will provide everyone with rank badges. Sabnock declares Iruma his rival. Asmodeus earns Dalet, 4th Rank, Clara earns Gimel, 3rd Rank and Sabnock earns Bet, 2nd Rank. Iruma, instead of a badge, receives a golden ring. A startled Sabnock recalls a prophecy, that the next Demon King will make other demons his servants, heal injuries with his blood, have been born a foreigner, and wear Solomon's Ring. Iruma freaks out when a black flame demon appears from the ring and starts draining power from his classmates. Naberius senses the ring threatening him and moves to sever Iruma's entire arm but is stopped by Sullivan who scolds him. Sullivan explains the ring is actually the Gluttonous Feeder Ring that eats magic power, then pacifies it by feeding it some of his power. Iruma's rank is undetermined and by default receives the lowest rank, Alef. Meanwhile, his taming of the guardian and his ring attacking his classmates increases his fame yet again.
6	6	"Ameri's Theory"; Transliteration: "Ameri no Kasetsu" (Japanese: アメリの仮説)	November 9, 2019
Iruma's fame draws the attention of the student council. In Botany Class, the students learn to use magic to grow demonic plants. Sabnock produces a feral flower that eats everything it sees, Asmodeus an elegant flower with flaming petals, and Clara a mutated flower beyond rational description. Having no magic, Iruma says the spell as a joke while thinking of his home in Japan. Sullivan's magic suddenly bursts from his ring, just as Sullivan calls Iruma to explain that the ring lets Iruma use magic, but Sullivan had forgotten to set a limit on its output. Iruma's overpowered seed explodes into a giant cherry blossom tree, destroying the greenhouse. Student council president, Azazel Ameri, recognizes the tree as a human plant and suspects Iruma is human. Ameri privately reveals most demons believe humans do not exist, but her family secretly owns a library of sacred relics, i.e. Japanese manga, and is obsessed with the First Love Memories series, but as she cannot read Japanese has mistakenly concluded it is a manual of human love spells. Iruma tries to clean up the falling cherry blossoms, despite Clara making more mess. As he leaves Iruma turns a corner and accidentally knocks Ameri over. Recognizing the similarity to a romantic scene from First Love Memories, Ameri believes Iruma is trying to make her fall in love with him using human magic and concludes he must be human.
7	7	"First Love Memories"; Transliteration: "Hatsukoi memorī" (Japanese: 初恋メモリー)	November 16, 2019
Iruma and Ameri end up frozen, unsure how to react. Iruma assumes Ameri is angry while Ameri assumes she is in a magical love duel. Ameri drops First Love Memories which Iruma recognises as a manga he helped illustrate to earn money. Ameri realises he can read Japanese and, rather than reveal he is human, drags him to her office and asks him to read the story out loud for her. After Iruma finishes, an embarrassed Ameri puts her number in his phone so she can ask him to read for her again. Iruma can't decide if he prefers his old life or his new life. Sullivan's servant, Opera, informs him it may be possible to visit the human world if he becomes a high-ranking demon. Iruma is summoned by Ameri, making Asmodeus and Clara suspicious. Ameri decides, based on First Love Memories, that spending time with Iruma counts as a date. Asmodeus and Clara buy Detection Warding Glasses to hide while following Iruma. Asmodeus assumes Iruma is hatching a plan to take over the student council while Clara assumes they are excluding her from a new game. After learning about ambition from First Love Memories and listening to Ameri's plans for the future, Iruma realizes his pushover personality had prevented him from having any ambition of his own.
8	8	"Head Over Heels for Clara"; Transliteration: "Kurara ni meromero" (Japanese: クララにメロメロ)	November 23, 2019
Asmodeus tries to stop Clara ruining Iruma's plans of taking over the school. Iruma struggles to come up with a dream, so Ameri urges him to raise his rank as a temporary goal. Clara breaks into the room to take Iruma back, assuming Ameri was trying to steal him. As time passes and Iruma spends more time with Ameri, Clara becomes increasingly jealous, so Sabnock suggests she lure Iruma with her feminine wiles. As Clara has no feminine wiles, she joins the Seduction Class to learn sexiness, but the succubus teacher, Raim, determines she has only 2% sexiness, making her impossibly innocent. Clara tries to use seduction methods on Iruma, but he assumes she is playing games. Clara becomes depressed but returns to normal after her mother kisses her forehead. The next day, Clara tries to use a kiss attack, but Iruma avoids it with his superhuman dodging skill, while Clara ends up receiving detention from Naberius. Clara admits she has zero sex appeal and resigns herself to losing Iruma, until Iruma innocently reveals he does think of her as a girl, restoring her confidence enough she declares she will make Iruma fall for her. Iruma feels an unusual thump in his heart as she pulls him along holding his hand. Raim happily observes that Clara's sexiness has risen to 10%. Iruma decides to get serious about raising his rank from Alef, 1st, to Bet, 2nd.
9	9	"Iruma's Decision and Hard Work"; Transliteration: "Iruma no Ketsui, takanaru doryoku" (Japanese: 入間の決意、高鳴る努力)	November 30, 2019
Iruma asks Asmodeus to help him climb the ranks and Asmodeus overreacts and begins planning to make Iruma a Yodh, 10th rank, and rule the school, though Iruma assures him he would be content with making it to Bet. Asmodeus agrees, assuming Iruma has a complicated reason for becoming a Bet, and explains the best way is to score well on an upcoming Rank Promotion Exam based on Execution Cannonball, a dangerous competition similar to human dodge ball. Iruma assumes he will do well with his ability to avoid danger until he realises the other students are allowed to use their demonic powers. He asks Sullivan for training and learns he can use his ring to use magic during the exam, but Iruma decides he wants to compete with his own power and not magic borrowed from Sullivan. Sullivan strengthens Iruma's hands to give him a fair chance then leaves the physical training to Opera. Iruma struggles to catch the ball as his instinct is still to dodge, but he refuses to give up and even gets help from Asmodeus and Clara. After a week, he still cannot catch the ball, but Opera assures Sullivan Iruma is definitely having fun. Eventually, Iruma manages to catch the ball, and Opera informs Sullivan Iruma is ready to take the exam.
10	10	"Fierce Battle, Execution Cannonball!!"; Transliteration: "Gekitō, shokeigyokuhō!!" (Japanese: 激闘、処刑玉砲！！)	December 7, 2019
The day of the exam arrives. Naberius explains their ranks will be increased based on the opponents they defeat, but only if they are on the winning team. Asmodeus is assigned to a different team from Iruma but decides to help him. The exam is instant chaos as Iruma's classmates use their powers while Clara floods the court with multiple balls. Iruma manages to catch the real ball, only to realise he never learned how to throw it. Sabnock, irritated that Asmodeus appears to be daydreaming, tries to strike him but Asmodeus strikes Sabnock out instead. Asmodeus continues to strike players out without thinking, until only he and Iruma remain. Asmodeus is put in a tight spot, if he lets Iruma win he would be helping Iruma gain a rank but also undermine all his hard work. After a moment of hesitation, he decides to throw with his whole power. Ameri arrives to watch the exam for herself. Iruma overcomes his fear and catches the powerful throw, but as he cannot stop it he instead spins in a circle to redirect the balls momentum back at Asmodeus who is struck out by his own power. Naberius, impressed by Iruma's tactic, promotes his rank to Bet, 2nd. Ameri congratulates Iruma on finally gaining an ambition. Iruma thanks Opera for all his training, upsetting an emotional Sullivan who realises he did very little to help Iruma at all.
11	11	"Together with Familiars!"; Transliteration: "Tsukaima to Issho!" (Japanese: 使い魔といっしょ！)	December 14, 2019
11	11	"The Battler's Challenge"; Transliteration: "Batora no Chōsen" (Japanese: 師団(バトラ)の挑戦)	December 14, 2019
A new teacher, Balse Robin, begins teaching the Misfit Class about the importance of bonding with one's familiar. Asmodeus and Sabnock summon their Gorgon snake and Kelbie horse and Clara summons her Falfal, a rare familiar whose actions are mysterious. Iruma tries to refuse, until Balse says "please", so Iruma summons a furious Naberius. Balse reminds Iruma he needs to control his familiar, according to the rules written by Naberius. Naberius decides to make Iruma the best summoner in class, even though it involves playing embarrassing games to promote trust. Iruma sincerely apologises so Naberius asks why Iruma didn't summon him to fight the valley guardian. Iruma explains it was so neither Naberius nor the guardian would get hurt. Asmodeus and Sabnock get in a fight so Naberius defeats their familiars and angrily informs the students that familiars are powerful, violent monsters only kept in check by their contracts. The best summoners should trust their familiars while also fearing them, as Iruma does. Naberius also forces Balse to rethink his teaching style. Iruma learns about the Battlers, groups of students with similar interests who form groups to help each other raise their ranks, like school clubs. Iruma decides to join one of the Battlers to find a new goal and possibly raise his rank again. Asmodeus tries to prepare Iruma as the senior Battlers begin their Rookie Hunt, an insanely terrifying stampede by older students to recruit first year students into their groups.
12	12	"The Rookie Hunt"; Transliteration: "Rūkī Hanto!!" (Japanese: 1年生争奪戦(ルーキーハント)！！)	December 21, 2019
As the hunt begins most seniors try to recruit Asmodeus. The hunt is so brutal the first years are put in actual physical danger. Ameri and the student council monitor most of the mayhem while Iruma realizes that Ameri is actually the student council president. Ameri surprises everybody by inviting Iruma to join the council's Battler. Naberius announces a three-day trial period where students can try numerous Battlers before deciding which to join permanently. Clara shows repeated interest in Raim's Succubus Battler. Iruma struggles to decide as his fame means he is invited to join every Battler. His ring suddenly activates and drags him through the air, dropping him on Ami Kirio, the recruiter for the Magical Apparatus Battler, whose necklace is made from the same metal as the ring. Iruma visits several Battlers, most of which are dangerous in some way and unsuitable. Sullivan alters Iruma's ring so he can choose the level of magic he wants to use, Devil, Demon, or Ifrit, and a level for emergencies only, Pandoroola. After testing the ring at the Execution Cannonball Battler, Ameri texts Iruma, reminding him to visit the council Battler before the trial period is over. Iruma is caught up in an explosion caused by one of Kirio's apparatus.
13	13	"The Magical Apparatus Battler"; Transliteration: "Magu kenkyū batora" (Japanese: 魔具研究師団(バトラ))	December 28, 2019
13	13	"The Thirteen's Dinner"; Transliteration: "Sātīn Dinā" (Japanese: 13冠の集い(サーティーン・ディナー))	December 28, 2019
The council members are confused over Ameri's sudden enthusiasm for Battler recruitment. Iruma texts her that he won't be able to visit the council after Kirio's explosion, but Ameri believes finding out she is the council president has scared him away. Kirio explains that he researches and creates magic items, but his magic power is so weak he cannot use the items he creates. His goal is to allow weaker demons to stand up to the higher-level demons that mistreat them. Iruma decides to join his Battler, and he is followed by Clara and Asmodeus. Iruma does later visit the student council, to Ameri's delight, at least until Iruma explains he joined another Battler. With the trial period over, the school prepares for the Battler Party for Battlers to welcome their new recruits and meet their parents. Sullivan must attend the Thirteen's Dinner, a meeting of the Netherworld's thirteen greatest demons, all of whom are concerned the netherworld is falling to chaos without a Demon King, and believe it is time to raise either Sullivan, Levi, or Belial to the throne. Levi and Belial agree Sullivan should take the throne, but Sullivan refuses as he would have less time to spend with Iruma. Henri, one of the thirteen and Ameri's father, is forced to arrest Sullivan after finding evidence Sullivan illegally visited the human world.
14	14	"The Battler's Presentation"; Transliteration: "Batora no Ohirome" (Japanese: 師団(バトラ)のお披露目)	January 4, 2020
Sullivan is questioned by Demon Border Control. Most of the first years panic at the thought of their parents visiting the school. Sullivan appoints Naberius as temporary school director while the rest of the staff wonders what Sullivan did to get arrested. Kirio reveals that all Battlers give presentations competing for prizes, maybe even a rise in rank, but the Magical Apparatus Battler has such a small budget they normally stand no chance, until Iruma is inspired to create fireworks. As the testing requires darkness, Kirio decides they must stay at school overnight. While trying to create gunpowder, Kirio reveals he has an ability to create magical barriers, the only reason he survives so many explosions. Iruma asks Ameri to loan him one of her manga so Kirio can see what a firework should look like, but she refuses, at least until she realises she would get to see real fireworks. After they successfully create fireworks, they exhaust themselves with a pillow fight, utilizing Iruma's dodge ability and Kirio's barriers. Kirio is later contacted by a powerful demon named Baal that can use lightning magic, revealing he is the reason Sullivan has been arrested and he has been plotting with Kirio to create a machine to destroy the school.
15	15	"Kiriwo's Secret Room"; Transliteration: "Kiriwo no Kakushi beya" (Japanese: キリヲの隠し部屋)	January 11, 2020
It is announced the Battler Party will last three days, and the first-place prize will be an increase in rank for the Battler members and an increase of two ranks for the Battler president. Kirio continues working on his machine, which flashbacks show he was only able to complete due to Iruma's help, and that his powerful demon friend plans to use his machine to kill as many students as possible. As Kirio works in his hidden workshop, he is suddenly interrupted by Iruma, who had been dragged through the air by his ring searching for Kirio's necklace. Kirio decides to reveal to Iruma that the secret workshop is hidden on the school roof behind one-way, soundproof glass, and that his plan to help the weak stand up to the strong includes the school bell, which will be rung to begin the Party. Still not understanding Kirio's meaning, Iruma urges him to try and win first prize with their fireworks to prove they don't need to be strong to win. Kirio appears happy he and Iruma are so alike. With the preparations over, the Battler Party can finally begin, to Kirio's delight.
16	16	"Party Eve"; Transliteration: "Zenyasai" (Japanese: 前夜祭)	January 18, 2020
The Party Eve begins, a festival the night before the main competitions start. As fireworks require darkness, Iruma and the others decide to scout their competition. Iruma knocks the Yakisoba Battler out of the competition by devouring their famous Ogre sized serving, leaving them with no ingredients. Iruma is warned by his classmates that his main competitors are the New Magic Battler, who will attempt to conjure water from a stone, the Game Battler, with their Virtual Sorcery Hat to allow people to experience virtual reality adventures, as well as the Underwater Circus, and the Magic Beast Battles. Asmodeus reveals they will set off their main firework as the school bell rings to signal the start of the competition. Clara accidentally lights the fuse, but when it misfires, they realise their biggest firework is missing. Kirio takes the stolen firework to his workshop. Meanwhile, Ameri's father possesses evidence of Sullivan kidnapping Iruma, given to him by Baal, the powerful demon helping Kirio. As the sun sets, Kirio destroys his necklace, covering the entire school with multiple barriers preventing people from being able to move around. Iruma finds himself separated from Asmodeus and Clara by a barrier while Kirio begins his plan.
17	17	"Run, Iruma, to Kiriwo!"; Transliteration: "Hashire Iruma, Kiriwo no moto e!" (Japanese: 走れ入間、キリヲのもとへ！)	January 25, 2020
Sullivan senses the barriers appearing. Iruma realises the barriers are Kirio's. Naberius finds the barriers are self-repairing, meaning they could only have been cast by a Tet, 9th Rank, and can likely only be fully destroyed by a Yodh, 10th Rank like Sullivan, meaning his arrest was arranged beforehand. Naberius manages to move by breaking barriers and moving through before they can repair and has another teacher announce to the students that the barriers are a surprise maze event by the New Magic and Game Battlers. Naberius begins researching all demons with barrier creation abilities. When most of the students make it to the courtyard easily, Naberius worries they were manipulated into going to the courtyard. Kirio loads the firework into his School Destroyer machine, but suddenly realises Iruma is heading to the lab, somehow finding his way toward Kirio even though he destroyed his necklace. A flashback reveals Asmodeus deduced Kirio must have been planning his attack for years and is now using a map of the school and one of Kirio's magical apparatus, copied by Clara, to guide Iruma through the barriers. Naberius identifies Kirio as the likely suspect and orders the teachers to capture him. Part of the school collapses and Ameri saves a student from being killed. Iruma finally reaches the lab.
18	18	"What I Want More Than Anything"; Transliteration: "Kokoro kara nozomu mono" (Japanese: 心から望むもの)	February 1, 2020
Iruma reaches the workshop where Kirio reveals he plans to use the firework to destroy the school. Kirio reveals the Ami family are famous for their barriers and magical strength, but when he was born with weak magic, he was sent to the Garden of Delinquents for problem children. Despite being bullied he made a friend, but when bullies stole her earring and threw it in a river, Kirio tried to catch it with a barrier but failed, devastating her. That was when Kirio realised he perversely enjoyed watching people's despair. Baal, who believed demons are too nice compared to their society's evil past, helped Kirio plan to destroy Babyls as a symbol of their weakened society while Kirio plans on enjoying Iruma's despair when Clara and Asmodeus die. However, when Iruma seems unconcerned and calmly removes the firework, Kirio is confused. Iruma explains that thanks to his childhood, he almost never feels despair anymore. Kirio realises he and Iruma are not alike at all. Iruma unlocks his rings Ifrit mode to throw the firework into the sky, but it hits the barrier. With the explosion seconds away Iruma breaks a promise he made to Sullivan and unlocks the ring's Pandoroola mode, obliterating the barrier and exploding the firework in the sky where it delights all the watching students. With Iruma passed out, Kirio saves him from falling off the roof, and despite raging that his plan is ruined, he admits defeat and that Iruma is a better demon than he is.
19	19	"I Want to Pick Everything Up"; Transliteration: "Zenbu hiroitai" (Japanese: 全部拾いたい)	February 8, 2020
19	19	"Family Time"; Transliteration: "Kazoku to no Jikan" (Japanese: 家族との時間)	February 8, 2020
It is revealed that as Iruma was talking with Kirio, Balse Robin used archery magic to shoot a warning note to Sullivan. Sullivan then broke out of prison and saw Iruma use Pandoroola to destroy the barrier, forcing Sullivan to save the school from falling debris. The teachers apprehend Kirio, though he does remind Iruma to beware of other demons wanting an evil society. He is taken by Demon Border Control to be interrogated. Sullivan shows Iruma that his firework was immensely popular with the students, though he is scolded by Ameri who wanted to watch the firework together. Iruma shares credit for the firework with Asmodeus, Clara, and Kirio. As the Battler Party starts, the students vote for their favourite Battlers just as their parents turn up for the party. Iruma prepares the remaining fireworks before meeting 4 of Clara's 5 siblings and her mother, who are all as eccentric as she is. Asmodeus is caught by his embarrassing mother, Amuryllis, a Demon Lord of Seduction, who showers Asmodeus with love and affection. Sullivan and Opera arrive to attend the festival with Iruma, causing general chaos as they do. As the sun sets, they set off the fireworks and Iruma declares his new family to be his pride and joy before insisting on posing for a photograph with Sullivan and Opera. With the voting over the winner of the Battler Party is decided.
20	20	"Glorious Award"; Transliteration: "Haearu Hyōshō" (Japanese: 栄えある表彰)	February 15, 2020
20	20	"Treatment of Humans"; Transliteration: "Ningen no Shogū" (Japanese: 人間の処遇)	February 15, 2020
The Closing Spectacular begins with the handing out of prizes. The Succubus Battler receives an upgraded club room, the New Magic Battler a year's supply of black holy water, while the grand prize of rank increases is given to the Broadcast Battler. Naberius announces that, for unspecified reasons, an extra award has been created, the prize for which is one member of the Battler will go up by one rank. The winners are announced to be the Magical Apparatus Battler, despite being disqualified due to Kirio's schemes, with Iruma getting the rank increase to Gimel, 3rd rank. Iruma worries he has spent too much time standing out instead of hiding. Ameri's father, Henri, takes an interest in Iruma. Ameri summons Iruma to read manga but rushes out after seeing her father. Henri confronts Iruma, not knowing why Sullivan is so attached to him. Henri tells Iruma he met a human once before and legally returned them to the human world. He begins to ask if Iruma wants to go home, but is interrupted by Ameri, who recounts all Iruma's recent achievements and claims he is an outstanding demon. Suspicious, Henri asks how Ameri knows Iruma and she awkwardly blurts out they spend time alone talking about love, shocking Henri into semi-consciousness. Asmodeus and Clara tell Iruma they know something happened with Kirio, but they are happy to wait for Iruma to tell them. Iruma decides he does not want to return to the human world and must work harder at hiding his human identity.
21	21	"Dem-dol Kuromu-chan"; Transliteration: "Akudoru Kuromu-chan" (Japanese: アクドルくろむちゃん！)	February 22, 2020
Iruma's rank increase gets more newspaper coverage than Kuromu, a dem-dol. Asmodeus explains dem-dols are vital as teenage demons go through an "evil cycle" of destructive behaviour, so they are distracted by popular entertainment which converts their impulses into healthy excitement. Kuromu is revealed to be Crocell Keroli, a quiet girl from the misfit class who is embarrassed by her cute idol persona. Despite her siblings being better academically, Crocell found that other demons treated her kindly because she was cute, so she became Kuromu to beat her siblings and earn a higher rank than her mother. However, since Iruma arrived he has been in the newspapers more often than her, making her jealous. At her next concert, she furiously realizes Iruma is in the audience, having received tickets from the Broadcast Battler. Coincidentally, Iruma wins a ticket to meet Kuromu in person. A furious Crocell struggles to keep her identity a secret, however, Iruma already knew who she was due to her distinctive hands. As her glasses contain identity detection warding, Crocell decides Iruma must be a super-fan to notice such small details but is surprised when Iruma admits he is jealous of how well she manages to stay hidden as he is tired of standing out by accident. Realising that Iruma is more popular than her without trying only makes Crocell more upset and she passes out with a fever from overusing her ice magic.
22	22	"Sparking Shock"; Transliteration: "Kirakira no Shōgeki" (Japanese: キラキラの衝撃)	February 29, 2020
Crocell’s manager, Mal, decides to cancel the show as cooling Crocell’s body back to normal requires a family member, none of whom will arrive in time. Ameri attends the concert with a ticket from her father, who is working security. Crocell has a nightmare about disappointing her family then wakes after she should have been on stage, only to realise Iruma saved the show by dressing as a girl and performing an opening act, with Clara and Asmodeus dressed as dem-dolls, in order to let Crocell recover. Ameri suspects the dem-dol on stage looks just like Iruma, but convinces herself it couldn’t be. Crocell realises Iruma, who hates standing out, was willing to go on stage to save her career and decides he isn’t so bad. She thanks Iruma for his help but then forces him to stay on stage performing for the entire concert. Afterwards, Mal tells Crocell her entire family actually came to help while she was asleep, making her incredibly happy. Mal also secretly reveals to Iruma Crocell’s family love her and has watched every concert on TV; they just cannot come in person because they also pass out when overexcited. Back at school, Crocell warns Iruma if he reveals her identity he will regret it. She also asks if they can still be friends, despite hating all the attention the female Iruma got in the newspapers.
23	23	"You Fit Right In Now, Iruma-kun"; Transliteration: "Najimimashita, Iruma-kun" (Japanese: 馴染みました！入間くん)	March 7, 2020
Iruma predicts he will have a normal day. After breakfast with Sullivan, he watches Asmodeus and Clara race to school, has homeroom with Naberius, and attends normal lessons. After school he reads Ameri more manga, which contains lines about keeping secrets. Ameri remembers the female dem-dol who looked like Iruma and nervously asks if he has anything bothering him, and he says he does not. Then, when handing him a snack, she touches his hand and her heart beats wildly. Iruma goes home, has a bath, then dinner with Sullivan, then goes to bed, but suddenly realises he now fits into demon society, and worries it no longer bothers him. Iruma becomes unusually withdrawn as he considers the offer Henri made to erase his memory and send him home. Asmodeus and Clara decide food will cheer him up and sneak into the school kitchen, however they end up arguing and decide to both make meals and see which Iruma prefers. Clara misunderstands her mother’s claim love is the most important ingredient and lovingly crafts a bizarre meal, whereas Asmodeus decides on an elegant fish dish, despite having ichthyophobia. In the morning, Iruma finds both dishes work together to become even tastier. Asmodeus and Clara are forced to agree after trying both dishes and declare it a draw after becoming friends again. Though, a few minutes later, they are arguing again. Iruma finally decides he wants to stay in the Netherworld after all.

=== Season 2 (2021) ===
No. overall	No. in season	Title	Directed by (Note: Information is taken from the ending credits of each episode.)	Written by	Original release date
24	1	"The Secret Behind the Ring"; Transliteration: "Yubiwa no Himitsu" (Japanese: 指輪の秘密)	Motoki Nakanishi	Kazuyuki Fudeyasu	April 17, 2021
Iruma re-adjusts back into his everyday life at the school. As he heads for lunch, the beast that had previously emerged from his ring once again appears, however, to both their surprise, he can suddenly now talk, discovering himself to be the manifestation of the Gluttonous Feeder Ring. After chastising Iruma for his poor use of magical abilities, the beast gets him to use a transformation spell to give him a proper form, which ends up becoming a small, slender, one-eyed figure in a suit; he also tells Iruma to refer to him as "Alicred". He convinces Iruma to continue experimenting with his transformation abilities, eventually leading him to transform into his "Irumi" outfit. At this same time, Ameri finds him and is completely flustered and confused at the sight of Iruma in a dress, and runs off before he can explain himself. He wants to clear up the misunderstanding, but Alicred refuses to reveal himself unless they can prove there are more cases like him. Iruma tries to ask Sullivan for answers, but he brushes it off as nonsense. While doing research on the Ring, and figuring out the moments in the past when Alicred was conscious, Iruma figures out that the higher ranks he gets, the more Alicred changes. Iruma declares his new goal to continue rising the ranks to learn the truth behind Alicred, even if it means standing out more, and still failing to clear up the misunderstanding with Ameri.
25	2	"Ameri's Decision"; Transliteration: "Ameri no Ketsudan" (Japanese: アメリの決断)	Ayaka Tsujihashi	Kazuyuki Fudeyasu	April 24, 2021
Ameri has nightmares about Iruma cross-dressing. Crocell forces Iruma to wear his dress for a photograph as her fans are demanding to know who the idol was at her concert. During the struggle Ameri witnesses Iruma on top of Crocell and drags him away. She asks him about the Magical Apparatus Battler which, after the incident with Kirio, has been closed. She offers to reopen it if Iruma, Clara, and Asmodeus each obtain letters of recommendation from three Battler presidents. Clara temporarily joins the Gaming Battler, Asmodeus the New Magic Battler, and Iruma is forced to join the Student Council under Ameri. While carrying out student council tasks, Iruma starts to realise how capable Ameri is, especially when she refuses to let Sullivan continue spoiling him. Later, while reading First Love Memories together, Ameri’s teacup breaks, which she considers ominous. Iruma soon grows into his role on the council, impressing the other members, while Ameri considers whether to make him a real council member. Ameri is lured away and drugged by an unknown hooded person. Her absence is soon noticed by the council, and when they find her she begins acting strangely.
26	3	"A Lovely Demoness"; Transliteration: "Otome na Akuma" (Japanese: 乙女な悪魔)	Hiroaki Kawashima	Nozomu Ōshima	May 1, 2021
The student council learns that Ameri has been infected by a spell that, while retaining her old memories, has turned her into a much more dainty lady-like woman, and that she should return to normal if she keeps up her usual routine. However, the council finds themselves struggling to keep up with the workload Ameri can no longer handle, as well as unable to keep up appearances due to current her cutesy persona. They are then surprised by the sudden arrival of the one the council believes to be responsible for Ameri's predicament, the flamboyant president of the Disciplinary Battler, Ronove Romiere. He declares his intentions to take over the student council now that Ameri's no longer fit to run it, while playing coy when they ask if he put the spell on her. He challenges them to a "dissolution election", where the student body can vote on who should be the student council, and whoever loses must be dissolved. Iruma slaps his hand away when he starts touching Ameri, leading him to retreat, while the rest of the council praise him. The following day, Ronove uses his bloodline ability, "Charisma", to campaign, leading to a mixed reception until he promises to be more lenient/fun than the current student council, while Ameri struggles to keep up with her small support. Iruma decides to contact Clara and Asmodeus for assistance when Ameri asks him to talk. While waiting, Alicred reappears, telling Iruma the spell is nearly undone and just needs a trigger to completely fix it. Ameri then enters, facing Iruma dressed in her original student council attire.
27	4	"The Student Council President's Gaze"; Transliteration: "Seito Kaichō no Nagame" (Japanese: 生徒会長の眺め)	Kei Umabiki	Nozomu Ōshima	May 8, 2021
Ameri had hoped her old outfit would trigger her return to normal but she now considers quitting the council to begin a peaceful high school life with Iruma. Iruma refuses and praises the hard work of her old personality. During the election, Ronove promises to make the school a pleasure paradise. Iruma's support reminds Ameri of how great she wanted Babyls to become, and she gives an impassioned speech imploring the students to pursue their own desires instead of Ronove's. Spotting Iruma in the crowd, Ameri realises she is completely in love with him, triggering her return to normal. Ronove denies cursing Ameri just as Clara and Asmodeus apprehend the real culprit, Eligoth Schenel, who created Ladylike Perfume to make Ameri cutesy to satisfy his perverted fantasies. After Eligoth is punished, Ameri invites Ronove onto the council. She also invites Iruma, but following her speech about pursuing his desires, he chooses to have the Magical Apparatus Battler reinstated, but also hopes to see Ameri at their next reading of First Love Memories. Alicred suggests the last trigger was difficult because Ameri secretly wanted Iruma to think she was cute. Ameri worries about acting normally around Iruma but finally decides to pursue her own desire to make Iruma hers.
28	5	"Invite Your Friends!"; Transliteration: "Otomodachi go Shōtai!" (Japanese: オトモダチご招待！)	Kōsuke Shimotori	Kazuyuki Fudeyasu	May 15, 2021
Sullivan decides to throw a party and insists Iruma invite his friends. Iruma cleans obsessively when Alicred teases him about Clara being the first girl he invited over. Fearing he is not making a good impression as Iruma’s grandpa, Sullivan insists they play "Dark Parade" in the basement, which Iruma realises is the demon version of a test of courage. Sullivan sets up a fake monster he can defeat to impress Iruma’s friends, only for Asmodeus to defeat it first. After Sullivan grovels for help, Opera uses a 3D projector to fake a dragon, which Sullivan "defeats". They also find a chest containing a cake Opera made as the prize for winning the game. Sullivan is once again depressed when Opera gets more credit for the cake than he did defeating the dragon. After Clara and Asmodeus leave, Sullivan is cheered when Iruma thanks him for letting his friends visit. Iruma realises he still has a lot to learn about demon society, so Alicred decides to secretly help and magically changes Iruma's personality to resemble a teenage demon experiencing their first Evil Cycle of wanting to do evil deeds. The next morning Sullivan is horrified to discover his darling Iruma has become rude, ungrateful, and just downright evil.
29	6	"Royal One"; Transliteration: "Roiyaru Wan" (Japanese: 王の教室(ロイヤル・ワン))	Natsumi Higashida	Kan'ichi Katō	May 22, 2021
Iruma's new personality leads his classmates to assume Iruma is in his Evil Cycle. When Iruma sees other students taking advantage of his fellow Misfit classmates, he confronts Kalego and demands they get a better classroom. Kalego claims there are no other available classrooms but Iruma demands the school give them the King's Royal Classroom, the classroom which the previous Demon King, Derkila, was a student in before becoming Demon King, now closed to honour his memory. Kalego is enraged at the suggestion so Iruma bets he can get the consent of every faculty member within three days, in which case Kalego will have to give them the room. Most of the Misfits claim they don’t actually care about the room, they only care about what is fun and best serves themselves, which Iruma points out is how real demons should be, egotistical, selfish, and evil, which is exactly why the Misfits deserve the King's Classroom the most. Inspired, the whole class agrees to help win the room. Iruma reveals he has a plan to get the faculties' consent, and he requires the help of Jazz, the Misfit’s notorious thief and pickpocket.
30	7	"The Teachers at Babyls"; Transliteration: "Babirusu no Kyōshitachi" (Japanese: 悪魔学校(バビルス)の教師たち)	Motoki Nakanishi	Kan'ichi Katō	May 29, 2021
Iruma deliberately enrages Kalego allowing Jazz to pickpocket his diary, which they trade to Momonoki, an instructor with a crush on Kalego, for her consent. Clara gets the consent of Instructor Furcas in exchange for Schneider, the Misfits most intelligent student, assisting her research. Instructor Morax trades his consent for Kamui’s perverted knowledge. Picero and Goemon get consent from Instructor Stolas in exchange for clearing weeds. Iruma poses for a family photograph to get Sullivan’s consent. Instructor Orias wagers his consent in a game with Lead, the Misfit’s notorious gambler. Despite his luck boosting magic, Orias is affected by the magic of Elizabetta to show her favouritism and loses to Lead. Instructor Buer wagers consent on a duel with Sabnock who tried to duel him during the opening ceremony. However, Sabnock offers a sincere apology for his actions, shocking Buer that Sabnock has matured so much, and he gives his consent. Iruma decides to get additional consent from Ameri and the council, convincing her with a heartfelt speech about the Misfit's potential and sealing the deal with a wall slap that overwhelms her heart. After three days the Misfits easily collect all remaining consents except one, Kalego's.
31	8	"The Miracle of Some Fools"; Transliteration: "Dōkeshi no Kiseki" (Japanese: 道化師の奇跡)	Ayaka Tsujihashi	Kan'ichi Katō	June 5, 2021
Iruma confronts Kalego with the teachers' consent forms, but Kalego points out his agreement with Iruma used the word "Faculty", not "Teachers", meaning Iruma was supposed to get consent from everyone employed at Babyls like the janitors, chefs, and librarians. For his lack of critical thinking, Kalego claims Iruma is unworthy to inherit Derkila's classroom. Suddenly, all the other staff arrives with their consent forms, having decided to help Iruma in gratitude for helping all of them in the past. Defeated, Kalego furiously gives his consent as well. As the classroom has been sealed for centuries, massive crowds gather to see the classroom and the Misfits learn they have become famous. Kalego opens the doors with much ceremony, revealing the Classroom to be as luxurious as a castle with multiple floors, rooms, and expensive furnishings. Iruma takes possession of Derkila's old throne, shocking everyone into silence as he temporarily takes on the appearance of a true Demon King. The very next day, Alicred's spell on Iruma finally runs out, returning Iruma to normal, revealing him to be completely embarrassed. Iruma apologises to everyone at school but they don't care as they have become closer as friend. Everyone poses for a photograph with Iruma on Derkila's throne, including a furious Kalego.
32	9	"Studying in the Netherworld"; Transliteration: "Makai no Obenkyō" (Japanese: 魔界のお勉強)	Kōsuke Shimotori	Mio Inoue	June 12, 2021
Kalego informs the Misfits the "End of Terminus" (demon summer vacation) is approaching, but if they fail their exams they must attend supplementary classes during Terminus instead. Iruma reveals to Clara and Asmodeus he is bad at studying, plus while he can read the questions thanks to Sullivan’s spell, he cannot understand what the questions are about. Asmodeus decides they will form a study group, revealing anyone with a high enough score goes up a rank, but score too low and they could go down a rank. Ameri forces Eligoth to join the Magical Apparatus Battler as keeping an eye on him has become too time consuming for the council. Alicred is also worried, since his intelligence is based on Iruma's rank, so if Iruma loses a rank Alicred will revert to a mindless black flame demon. Asmodeus quizzes Iruma on the exam's five subjects and Iruma gets a perfect score on Mythical Zoology as every question is about humans and human society. Experiencing an unusual level of confidence from his perfect score, Iruma decides to take an elective class in Netherworld History taught by the Mythical Zoology textbooks author, Balam Shichiro, who is strange even by Netherworld standards.
33	10	"Balam's Lesson"; Transliteration: "Baramu no Jugyō" (Japanese: バラムの授業)	Kei Umabiki	Mio Inoue	June 19, 2021
Balam is obsessed with "Imaginary Creatures" that may or may not exist, like humans. While discussing how demons evolved wings, Balam notices Iruma doesn't seem to have any, until Alicred hurriedly transforms into miniature wings and attaches himself to Iruma’s back. Balam believes Iruma's small wings are a deformity and apologises for exposing them, revealing that he himself is abnormal as his mask conceals his scarred face. Iruma accidentally blurts out he is human and fears Balam will eat him, but instead Balam is happy to have proof humans exist and warns Iruma to be more careful in the future, making Iruma realise he is actually quite nice. Returning to class, Iruma finds everyone depressed over studying. Iruma, who always had to spend summer breaks working, is motivated by invitations to spend Terminus having fun with the Misfits. Balam appears and it is revealed he and Kalego were actually classmates years ago, and are still good friends. Seeing the Misfits struggling, Balam shows them different ways of studying, such as singing songs and playing games, and even creates educational picture books for Iruma. The Misfits begin helping each other and Iruma finds that studying has become fun. Finally, the day of the exams arrive.
34	11	"End-of-Terminus Exams"; Transliteration: "Shūmatsu Tesuto" (Japanese: 終末テスト)	Motoki Nakanishi	Konomi Shugo	June 26, 2021
34	11	"Girls' Talk"; Transliteration: "Gāruzu Tōku" (Japanese: ガールズトーク)	Motoki Nakanishi	Konomi Shugo	June 26, 2021
Kalego informs the Misfits they all passed their exams, several of them have gone up a rank, and Schneider, the most intelligent, has gone up two ranks. Asmodeus claims without Iruma's influence most Misfits would have failed. Kalego congratulates Iruma on passing but it was not enough to go up a rank. Iruma informs Balam, who agrees Iruma seems able to influence people to be better. Kalego reveals Balam is the only other Khet, rank 8, apart from himself, and can sense lies which he uses to catch exam cheaters like Eligoth, though Balam does admit one student seems immune to detection. Ameri invites Iruma to their usual manga reading, only for Clara to inform her Iruma is at karaoke with the boys, so she drags Ameri to a girl’s only tea party with Elizabetta and Crocell. Elizabetta insists on talking about relationships and Clara realises she might have a crush on Iruma and wouldn’t mind marrying him, causing Ameri to realise Clara might be a serious rival. After a brief argument over Iruma and love, everyone agrees to swap contact information and meet for another tea party. Iruma arrives to read manga to Ameri, but is thrown out as it is a girl’s only tea party.
35	12	"Kalego-sensei's Home Visit"; Transliteration: "Karuego Sensei no Katei Hōmon" (Japanese: カルエゴ先生の家庭訪問)	Takahiro Tamano	Kan'ichi Katō	July 3, 2021
Kalego is furious when Sullivan forces him to carry out home visits. Visiting Asmodeus' home, he learns his obsession with Iruma has caused him to neglect his younger sisters. Kalego determines Asmodeus should focus on himself more and could become a very powerful demon. At Clara's home, he is mobbed by Clara's siblings until Urara, Clara's most normal brother, calms everyone down long enough for Kalego to inform their mother Clara is a troublemaker with a good personality and a bright future, assuming she learns to think before she acts. The other visits go just as badly as he must duel Goemon's father, protect his wallet from Jazz's brother, and avoid marrying Lead's older sister. Arriving at Iruma's home, it transpires Kalego is terrified of Opera, who was his senior in high school and would torment Kalego to amuse himself. Kalego informs Sullivan Iruma has average grades and is always involved in major incidents, but has made many useful friends and has a natural ability to overcome challenges. Kalego attempts to leave but Opera tricks Iruma into summoning him in his cute owl form for amusement. As a result of the visit, Kalego gives the Misfits homework for over the holidays. Terminus begins and the Misfits invite Iruma to the Walter Amusement Park.
36	13	"Walter Park"; Transliteration: "Worutā Pāku" (Japanese: ウォルターパーク)	Kōsuke Shimotori	Kan'ichi Katō	July 10, 2021
Iruma and the Misfits attend Walter Park, but Sullivan has insisted Kalego, Balam, and Opera attend as chaperones. Ameri also attends, mistakenly thinking it would be a date alone with Iruma. As the Misfits want to try different things they split into three groups. Kalego is pressured into funding a prize for the team that has the most fun, but insists those in third place receive double homework. Opera takes the girls; Balam takes Iruma, Asmodeus, Sabnock, and Picero, while Kalego takes Jazz, Goemon, Kamui, and Lead. The girls decide to force Ameri to buy a cute dress. Kalego's team decide to somehow force him to enjoy himself. Iruma sees Ronove who reveals Walter Park is owned by his father. Ronove also accidentally reveals the park's basement is Uraboros Prison, where imprisoned criminals secretly have their magic drained to power the park. It is revealed Kirio is in the prison and is working with a group of other inmates to escape, including outside assistance from the notorious Musashino Crew, an extremist group who believe demons should revert to being evil. Kirio had arranged to help them destroy Walter Park if they freed them from prison first.
37	14	"Everyone's Playmates"; Transliteration: "Minna no Asobi Aite" (Japanese: みんなの遊び相手)	Natsumi Higashida	Mio Inoue	July 17, 2021
Opera’s team have fun trying on dresses with Walter employees, Miki and Hyudarin. Kalego’s team take part in a shooting game with employees, Atori and Maemaro. Kalego’s team consider exploring Kiraragi Street but are warned by Kalego a battle once occurred there between demons during their evil cycles and even today it is a corrupt place where criminals gather. Coincidentally, Iruma gets lost down Kiraragi Street and is almost grabbed by a shady demon but is saved by a lady named Shiida. Despite her serious demeanour, she buys him ice cream and asks if he can show her how to have fun. Iruma helps her play with animals at the petting zoo and ride a ferris wheel. Eventually finding Asmodeus, Iruma tries to thank Shiida but she disappears. Iruma learns about Six Fingers, another criminal group wanting to revert to the old ways. Ronove removes Picero’s sleep mask and discovers he is almost impossibly beautiful. Ronove's servant, Wett, leaves and reveals he, Shiida, Miki, Hyudarin, Atori, and Maemaro are actually the Six Fingers planning to attack Uruboros and free Kirio. Wett sets off three magical items that summon three gigantic monsters to destroy the park, a Carmine Dragon, a Mountain Blue Minotaur, and a Panther Rat.
38	15	"Magical Beasts Attack"; Transliteration: "Majū Shūgeki" (Japanese: 魔獣襲撃)	Ayaka Tsujihashi	Kazuyuki Fudeyasu	July 24, 2021
The monsters begin destroying the park. Kalego forces his team to fight Mountain Blue, even though they haven’t learned attack magic yet. By combining their various powers they manage to partially blind, distract, then attack Mountain Blue, but it has no real effect. Six Fingers infiltrate the prison to find Kirio and open all the cells to keep the guards busy. Vice Chief of the prison, Triton the Handshaker, who once broke a dragon’s neck with his bare hands, is defeated by Hyudarin, whose strength surpasses Triton despite being only a few inches tall. Jazz, having the highest rank, is put in charge by the others, despite his own fear. Jazz tries and fails to come up with an effective plan, until Kalego gives him a hint about the necklace Jazz always wears. Iruma is upset the day is ruined and begins to experience an unusual feeling. Several children are trapped by rubble and Iruma realises no other demons are willing to help, their natural selfishness preventing them helping unless it somehow benefits themselves, and they abandon the children with ease. Iruma finally realises what his unusual feeling is, an emotion he has never experienced before, anger.
39	16	"The Name of This Feeling"; Transliteration: "Kono Kanjō no Namae wa" (Japanese: この感情の名前は)	Ayaka Tsujihashi; Motoki Nakanishi	Kazuyuki Fudeyasu	July 31, 2021
Iruma rushes to help, even though it puts him in the way of Dragon, inspiring his classmates to help. Opera fights Rat with Ameri insisting on helping. Jazz and the boys manage to distract Minotaur long enough for Jazz to climb inside its ear. His necklace is revealed to be an Earpiercer Whistle which creates a sound wave that grows louder the more magic is put into it. Jazz creates such a huge sound wave it ruptures Minotaur’s ears. Kalego decides they have done enough and steps in, defeating Minotaur with a single move, which he admits was fun and agrees to pose for a victory photograph. Crocell sees the other guests panicking, quickly changes into her Kuromu persona, and puts on an impromptu dem-doll show to ease everyone’s fear. Ameri reveals her bloodline ability, Romantista, which increases her physical abilities the more she believes in herself. With her confidence boosted by Crocell’s song, she defeats Rat easily. Opera is so impressed he offers her a job working for Sullivan and Ameri is tempted as it would mean living in the same house as Iruma. Iruma and Picero save the children while Asmodeus and Sabnock prepare to battle Dragon.
40	17	"The Ultimate Halberd"; Transliteration: "Saikyō no Hoko" (Japanese: 最強の矛)	Hisaya Takabayashi	Konomi Shugo	August 7, 2021
Asmodeus and Sabnock become distracted arguing with each other while fighting Dragon. Dragon turns on Balam, Iruma, and the children, who only survive thanks to Balam. Asmodeus is distracted thinking Iruma is hurt, allowing Dragon to seemingly kill Asmodeus. Iruma is devastated until it is revealed Sabnock had saved Asmodeus. Sabnock is still willing to fight, having learned to surpass his limitations when Iruma saved him from the Valley Guardian, and scolds Asmodeus for being so concerned with Iruma he forgot to have ambitions of his own. Balam creates the giant wooden dragon Nigipnir and kills Dragon. Six Fingers sense the three monsters defeat and merge it into the larger Composite Magical Beast. Opera has Iruma summon Kalego in his owl form who teams up with Balam and Opera to defeat Beast. Kalego is devastated to learn that when in his owl form his familiar, Cerberus, becomes a puppy. Beast gathers its remaining magic to create a bomb to kill everyone in the park's emergency shelter. Unable to do anything in time, everyone is shocked when Ronove appears and uses his Charisma ability to force Beast to look at him, aiming the bomb away from the shelter and towards himself. Just as Ronove is about to die Iruma steps in front of him.
41	18	"My Desire"; Transliteration: "Boku no Yoku" (Japanese: 僕の欲)	Kōsuke Shimotori	Mio Inoue	August 14, 2021
Iruma unleashes Alicred who swallows Beast's magic, defeating it for good. Kalego scolds Iruma for risking himself again but admits he did excellently. Opera understands why Sullivan chose Iruma as his grandson. Six Fingers reach Kirio and explain Lord Baal sent them. Kirio is overcome with emotion realising Iruma destroyed Beast and believes they are fated enemies. Baal contacts him, angry Walter Park still stands as its purpose to de-stress demons in their Evil Cycles is a barrier to his plans. Ronove's father puts the Misfits in a hotel as thanks for saving his park. Ameri approaches Iruma alone at a party, despite it looking like a romantic manga scene. Iruma tells her he is still unsure of his ambition but for now is happy to work to keep having fun. Ameri asks Iruma if, one day, they can do something together, just the two of them and despite being interrupted by Clara and Asmodeus, Iruma agrees, causing Ameri to pass out. The attack is mentioned on the news and Iruma becomes a hero overnight, causing the hotel to be swarmed by reporters and admirers. As it is unsafe to return home, Clara invites them to her house instead.
42	19	"Clara's House"; Transliteration: "Kurara no Ouchi" (Japanese: クララのお家)	Ayaka Tsujihashi	Nozomu Ōshima	August 21, 2021
Iruma is surprised as he has never been invited to a friend's house. Arriving they find Clara's mother and siblings going overboard to welcome Clara's first friends. Their home is filled with strange objects apparently sent home by Clara's father, a professional adventurer. Clara is embarrassed when Iruma is shown her baby picture album until he remarks that she was super cute. It is explained that the family collects their food from the surrounding Hubbub Forest. Clara and Asmodeus try to compete over finding the best ingredients for Iruma, so Clara’s mother suggests hunting the Shabbu-Shabbu from Collateral Cave, the most delicious beast in the forest. Clara praises Iruma as the Hero of Walter Park, causing Asmodeus to consider if he actually helped at Walter Park at all. The Shabbu-Shabbu is a strange monster made from both animal and vegetable parts. It almost eats Clara's brothers but Asmodeus saves them and Clara's mother arrives and catches the Shabbu-Shabbu. After dinner, Clara is revealed to be excellent at singing relaxing bedtime songs. The next morning, Clara's mother secretly adds more photos to her album showing Clara has continued to grow up. Meanwhile, Ameri's father, Henri, flies towards Clara's home.
43	20	"Dream Date"; Transliteration: "Yumemiru Dēto" (Japanese: 夢見るデート)	Shūji Miyazaki	Mio Inoue	September 4, 2021
Henri informs Iruma he can return home but turns furious when Iruma asks about Ameri. Ameri plans a perfect date and arranges to meet Iruma privately at Aqua Case, an aquarium/swimming pool, but Iruma remains oblivious it is a date. Ameri’s plan fails repeatedly; due to her greater height she cannot hold Iruma’s hand because they're too far apart, and Iruma can't hold her from behind on the water slide because of her taller height means she has to ride behind him instead. Iruma buys gifts for everyone, including Clara which makes Ameri jealous and worrying the date isn’t exciting enough. They attend the fortune telling show where Mako, a water dragon, psychically picks ideal romantic partners. Unfortunately, the water has washed off the perfume hiding Iruma’s human scent so Mako tries to eat him. Ameri defeats Mako, ending up with Iruma in her arms. Ameri becomes depressed her plan was a total failure until Iruma notices a cut on her leg. Despite the embarrassment, Ameri claims it hurts to walk and wants to be carried, so Iruma uses magic to make the taller Ameri light enough to carry in his arms, making her realize that despite her plans' failure, it was the best date ever.
44	21	"The One Who Rules Over the Netherworld"; Transliteration: "Makai o Suberu Mono" (Japanese: 魔界を統べる者)	Natsumi Higashida	Kazuyuki Fudeyasu	September 11, 2021
Iruma finishes the extra homework assigned by Kalego for losing the Walter Park competition. Sullivan and Opera take him shopping and while buying books, Sullivan purchases a copy of prophecies about the Demon King. Many people wonder why Sullivan still hasn’t taken the throne so Iruma asks about the Demon King. Sullivan remembers how Derkila, the now missing Demon King, was a lot like Iruma. Sullivan explains about the Thirteen Crowns, the leaders of the Netherworld like Sullivan. To become Demon King requires the support of all thirteen, but it is a heavy responsibility as the Demon King is the Netherworld itself and his power over it is absolute and can remake it any way they see fit, explaining current Netherworld society is simply the way Derkila wished it to be. Sullivan even remarks he would be interested to see what would happen if Iruma became Demon King, something Iruma seems quite concerned about, especially later after reading the prophecy scroll. Alicred summons himself and berates Iruma for forcing him to swallow all Beast's magic and then largely ignoring him ever since while enjoying himself. As the new term begins Kalego informs the Misfits unless they all achieve Daleth, 4th Rank, they will lose their right to use the Royal Classroom.

=== Season 3 (2022–23) ===
No. overall	No. in season	Title	Directed by	Written by	Original release date
45	1	"The Misfit Class's New Term"; Transliteration: "Futekigō Kurasu no Shin Gakki" (Japanese: 不適合クラスの新学期)	Masafumi Satō	Kazuyuki Fudeyasu	October 8, 2022
To help the Misfits achieve Daleth, Kalego has invited personal tutors for them. Jazz and Alocer are given fire demon Sergeant Furfur, who promises to make them the craftiest demons. Goemon and Picero have water demon Vepar, who promises to train them to have the strongest bloodline abilities. Elizabetta and Clara have Raim, who promises to make them the most charming demonesses. Crocell and Kamui have gentleman Mr. Hat, who promises to make them the greatest users of summoning magic. Sabnock and Asmodeus are given Balam, who promises to make them the strongest warriors. Iruma and Lead are given Balse, who only promises to train their fighting spirits. Ameri reminisces about her date with Iruma but is upset she did not manage to see him before school started. She is further disappointed when, due to his lessons with Balse, Iruma is forced to cancel their reading of First Love Memories, but she accepts it is necessary. Balse explains that while he planned their lessons, they will actually be taught by his cousin, Barbatos Bachiko, who unlike Balse is loud, violent, and cruel, and only bothering to teach them since Sullivan asked her personally. She immediately begins training by hurling abuse at them, forcing them to obey her every childish demand, and even forcing them to wear dresses for her amusement.
46	2	"Master Bachiko"; Transliteration: "Shishō Bachiko" (Japanese: 師匠バチコ)	Ayaka Tsujihashi	Kazuyuki Fudeyasu	October 15, 2022
Lead decides to ask Balse to tutor him, but Iruma stays with Barbatos. She reveals to Iruma no one else has put up with her abuse this long before and his stubborn instinct to please other people makes tutoring him pointless. Iruma decides to try harder to become Barbatos' ideal errand boy. Later, the Misfits discuss their hellish training. Goemon and Picero reveal Vepar submerges them so they almost drown. Balse forces Lead to play video games without sleep to increase concentration. Asmodeus and Sabnock battle Balam constantly and have many injuries. Jazz and Alocer are missing after Furfur took them somewhere mysterious. Clara and Elizabetta strike sexy poses for hours, and Crocell and Kamui are forced into cages with their summoned creatures. Sullivan visits Barbatos to ask about Iruma's progress and it turns out Barbatos was having so much fun abusing Iruma she forgot to start his actual training. She reveals to Iruma her weapon, a bow that shoots 100 arrows with perfect accuracy. Most demons have too short an attention span to learn but she is confident Iruma can learn to shoot and even advance beyond Daleth. Seeing Iruma is eager to learn, she takes him to create his own weapon at the Magical Apparatus Battler, unaware Iruma is the battler's de facto president after Kirio's departure.
47	3	"Iruma's True Feelings"; Transliteration: "Iruma no Honne" (Japanese: 入間の本音)	Naoyoshi Kusaka	Kazuyuki Fudeyasu	October 22, 2022
Barbatos shows Iruma her bloodline ability lets her create bows from any material, but Iruma will need a power core for the spell. Iruma selects a feather from his friend, the valley Guardian Beast. Barbatos warns him the next exam, the Harvest Festival, is a battle for survival, and unless he can create a bow tailored to his desires, he will fail. Barbatos recalls her heartache over her past students who failed or quit, and doubts Iruma will succeed as he seems to have no desires at all. Goemon and Picero evolve their bloodline abilities to escape Vepar's water cage. Crocell and Kamui form better relationships with their creatures and become stronger Summoners. Lead begins beating Balse at games, showing his improved concentration. Sabnock and Asmodeus learn to cooperate and strike Balam. Elizabetta masters sexy posing, but Clara masters sexiness through purity, the rarest sexiness. Iruma thinks hard about his desired bow, until Alicred points out thinking hard is the problem; desires are instinctive and above all, selfish. Thus, he demands Iruma's most selfish wish, which Iruma reveals is to heroically reach Daleth. Iruma successfully creates a winged demonic bow so perfect it fills Barbatos heart with hope again. With every Misfit having proven their potential for Daleth, the tutors move them on to the next stage of training; more weeks of hellish suffering.
48	4	"The Signal That the Harvest Festival Has Begun"; Transliteration: "Shūkaku-sai no Noroshi" (Japanese: 収穫祭の狼煙)	Hisaya Takabayashi	Kan'ichi Katō	October 29, 2022
After these several weeks, Barbatos decides Iruma is ready, but as his bow only has two arrows she insists he choose the right moments to use them. The Harvest Festival arrives; a hunt to gather food ingredients from a dangerous forest. Theft and betrayal is encouraged since students are graded as individuals, not as teams, but physical fighting is forbidden. Winners are said to have great futures, with past winners including Ameri, her father Henri, and Balam. The Misfits' weeks of hellish training have left them beaten up and yet emanating terrifyingly demonic auras. Asmodeus is gleeful at seeing Iruma again while Clara has concealed herself inside a fluffy animal suit and says nothing to anyone. The festival time limit is 6666 minutes; roughly 4.5 days, and ingredients can be submitted to referees to earn points at any time. Inside the forest, most students gather the easy ingredients for 10 points each. Asmodeus and Sabnock plan to hunt boss class monsters worth 3000 points each and share the points. However, there is also a legendary ingredient, the Legend Leaf, worth 100,000 points no one has ever found. Their plotting is interrupted by the Dorodoro brothers, Ichiro and Niro, skilled warriors forced to repeat their first year for being notorious rule breakers, who offer to compete for the boss monsters.
49	5	"Cunning Demons"; Transliteration: "Kōkatsu na Akuma" (Japanese: 狡猾な悪魔)	Shinnosuke Itō	Kan'ichi Katō	November 5, 2022
Ichiro and Niro declare if they win they will retrieve their Master Sabnock and Asmodeus stole from them. Crocell and Kamui use their improved summoning to make monsters gather ingredients for them. Allocer uses his intelligence to identify only the most valuable ingredients and teams up with Jazz to con other students out of their points. It is revealed during their training Furfur actually ran up a huge debt to the Demon Mafia then sold Jazz and Allocer to them as payment. They were forced to work in a casino, surviving by learning to anticipate peoples' intentions and then manipulate them. Every day Furfur would challenge them to a coin toss for their freedom and always won with Jazz certain he was cheating but never seeing how. After three weeks they realised the point wasn’t to identify how Furfur was cheating, it was to win by cheating him back. They won the next coin toss with a dirty trick, but Furfur had anticipated their cheating and somehow still beat them, but offered them a chance to play another game with him if they win the Harvest Festival. Meanwhile, Sullivan watches with some concern as many students plan to ambush Iruma, and yet Iruma appears to calmly wait for them to try.
50	6	"Devilishly Pure"; Transliteration: "Mashō no Pyua" (Japanese: 魔性のピュア)	Yūki Morita	Kan'ichi Katō	November 12, 2022
The audience are confused to see Iruma sat eating his gathered ingredients with Lead. Balam explains to the audience Iruma is actually doing the right thing; the Festival lasts four days and most demons will exhaust themselves exchanging ingredients for points and then lose when they pass out from hunger, so by eating first then gathering points later, Iruma may actually win. Made a survival expert by his harsh childhood, Iruma teaches Lead how to thrive in adversity. The students planning to ambush Iruma leave since he has left no ingredients for them to steal. Lead finds he is actually enjoying himself but laments the lack of girls to talk to, referencing the fun they had when they attended a mixer with Sabnock, Jazz, and girls from other classes. Elizabetta and Clara in her costume abruptly appear. Clara drags Iruma away while Elizabetta charms Lead out of his secret ingredient stash without even resorting to her new sexy powers. It is revealed during her training Elizabetta wished for the skills to find a man to truly love. Once alone, Clara drags a surprised Iruma inside her costume, trapping them both inside, and declares Iruma as successfully captured.
51	7	"Clara's Toy Box"; Transliteration: "Kurara no Omochahako" (Japanese: クララのおもちゃ箱)	Masafumi Satō	Nozomu Ōshima	November 19, 2022
51	7	"A Night Filled with Screams"; Transliteration: "Sakebigoe no Hibiku Yoru" (Japanese: 叫び声の響く夜)	Masafumi Satō	Nozomu Ōshima	November 19, 2022
Clara reveals her magical pockets have evolved into a dimensional space called Toy Box, filled with every toy and game imaginable. Iruma childishly can't resist and they play games for hours. Privately, Clara reveals she plans to finally make Iruma fall in love with her. It is also revealed Toy Box is designed to drain the "victim's" magic to function, but Clara finds her magic is draining faster than Iruma’s, meaning she is already in love with him. She confesses she loves him, but Elizabetta suddenly opens the costume, ending the spell and revealing it is already night. Iruma wonders what might have happened had Elizabetta not interrupted. As Clara and Elizabetta depart with their stolen ingredients, Iruma and Lead develop a new respect for the power of female demons. As night falls, many exhausted students find themselves becoming victims of the more dangerous ingredients and quit the competition in a panic. Many students even require referees to rescue them as the ingredients' various magical abilities leave them incapacitated. One monster ingredient chases several girls into a castle and wake up Picero, who had been sleeping inside. Without his customary sleep mask the girls see his beautiful face and fall instantly in love.
52	8	"Can We Make 100 Friends?"; Transliteration: "O Nakama 100-ri Dekiru ka na" (Japanese: お仲間100人できるかな)	Ayaka Tsujihashi	Nozomu Ōshima	November 26, 2022
52	8	"The Students I'm Proud Of"; Transliteration: "Jiman no Deshi-tachi" (Japanese: 自慢の弟子たち)	Ayaka Tsujihashi	Nozomu Ōshima	November 26, 2022
Picero explains he used his ability, My Area, to extend his bed into a whole castle, but is extremely angry Goemon is letting people inside. The girls realise Goemon and Picero are on the edge of a serious fight. More students try to enter so Picero fights with Goemon over letting them in. Goemon rescues them anyway so Picero, feeling guilty, lets them in and the girls relax with the fight over. However, Picero starts another argument when he sees Goemon has rescued dozens of people. The tutors hold a drinking party with Sullivan, Opera, and Barbatos. Mr. Hat is proud Crocell and Kamui have earned 14,200 points through monster taming. Raim is proud Elizabetta and Clara have earned 9400 by manipulating the boys. Vepar is proud Picero and Goemon have earned 8200 by hunting from the safety of their castle. Furfur is proud Jazz and Alocer earned 12,800 by theft and cunning. Sullivan and Barbatos insists Iruma is the likeliest to win, even though Iruma and Lead currently have zero points. In the forest, Lead is certain Elizabetta has feelings for him while Iruma is confused by Clara's confession. The tutors get drunk and pass out. In the forest, all the students sleep for the night, except Asmodeus, Sabnock, and the Dorodoro brothers who battle a giant monster.
53	9	"The Dorodoro Brothers' Provocation"; Transliteration: "Dorodoro Kyōdai no Chōhatsu" (Japanese: ドロドロ兄弟の挑発)	Tatsuji Yamazaki	Nozomu Ōshima	December 3, 2022
The Dorodoro brothers demand their master back, goading Asmodeus and Sabnock into their challenge. The two pairs battle a Flapple Bird worth 10,800 points. Niro is a master strategist and Ichiro is fully combat proficient, a perfect team, while Asmodeus and Sabnock argue constantly. The brothers are revealed to have a bloodline ability, Peacock of Provocation, that makes enemies lose their temper, so they provoke Sabnock to attack them to disqualify him from the festival. Asmodeus stops him in time, exposing their ability. The brothers explain their dream to be warriors almost got them killed when they joined a battle totally unprepared. Their master rescued and trained them but suddenly left to become a teacher. Asmodeus and Sabnock assume they mean Balam, but it is abruptly revealed their master is actually Furfur; they never bothered to confirm who Furfur was tutoring, assuming it would be the strongest of the Misfits, Asmodeus and Sabnock. Asmodeus loses his temper and reveals Balam gave them secret pills to trigger his Evil Cycle at will, increasing his power and his repressed evil side; unimaginably elegant and savage. The Flapple is defeated and despite their desire to see Asmodeus disqualified, the brothers must dodge his attacks to avoid death. Sabnock snaps Asmodeus back to normal with a programmed password, the closest thing to Asmodeus' heart; Iruma. Back to normal, they argue over who gets the most points from the Flapple. The brothers can't believe they were defeated by two people with such poor teamwork.
54	10	"The Iruma I Know"; Transliteration: "Watashi no Shiru Iruma wa" (Japanese: 私の知るイルマは)	Naoyoshi Kusaka	Konomi Shugo	December 10, 2022
The referees announce it is now day two of the festival. Lead is convinced Iruma is planning to find the Legend Leaf; Iruma is so surprised by the suggestion he agrees without thinking. As no student has ever seen the Leaf, Iruma wonders about asking the monsters themselves, leading them to Crocell and Kamui. They find her new authority over animals has almost put Crocell into her Evil Cycle, styling herself Queen of Monsters with Kamui as her Majordomo. In exchange for wearing dresses and dancing while Caroli takes pictures, her monsters reveal the Leaf has not even grown yet and give a riddle concerning the location of the seed and the vase it must be grown in. The watching tutors are impressed as this is the first time a student has found the riddle. So many students begin to quit from exhaustion, so the referees bring in the student council to help rescue them. Ameri is convinced Iruma will be the one to finally find the leaf. A council member teases Iruma might give Ameri the Leaf's flowers in a bouquet, sending her into a daydream of dating and marriage. Ameri discovers a gambling den of forfeited students wagering on who will win. She investigates and finds the ringleaders are two Misfits who forfeited suddenly and inexplicably; Jazz and Allocer.
55	11	"Toto the Genie"; Transliteration: "Majin Tōtō" (Japanese: 魔神トートー)	Kōsuke Shimotori	Konomi Shugo	December 17, 2022
Jazz and Allocer reveal they fell prey to student Orobas, whose bloodline ability Trauma made Jazz see nightmarish visions of his selfish brother Rock. When Jazz attacked Rock, he actually attacked Orobas so both he and Allocer were disqualified. Allocer informs Ameri Orobas is specifically targeting the Misfits to disqualify them. As the riddle contains multiple clues, Iruma and Lead take half the riddle each and split up. Iruma discovers the cave that should contain the seed, but Alicred worries about Iruma's ability to defend himself alone. Iruma discovers Naphula the Silent, a notoriously smelly student trapped by vines. Alicred suggests leaving him but Iruma rescues him. Reaching an underground temple they locate the seed only to narrowly dodge an attack by the seed's giant guardian, Toto the Genie. Toto informs them to earn the seed they must either defeat him in battle or tell him something interesting. Iruma and Naphula are stumped as Toto knows everything there is to know about the Netherworld. Iruma realises Toto is ignorant about humans so he, Alicred, and Nephula perform scenes from First Love Memories that Toto becomes obsessed with. Toto awards them the seed then demands Iruma's phone number so Iruma can tell him the rest of the story later.
56	12	"Wish Upon Your Bow"; Transliteration: "Negai o Yumi ni" (Japanese: 願いを弓に)	Hisaya Takabayashi	Konomi Shugo	December 24, 2022
Iruma decides to share his points with Naphula, noticing also that Naphula's stench no longer bothers him. Finding their way out of Toto's temple, Iruma is abruptly met by his selfish human parents, who announce they have returned to begin taking advantage of Iruma again. He is so terrified by their return he slips and falls into a chasm. Orobas, who had used his Trauma to give Iruma nightmarish visions, is satisfied by Iruma's supposed death but leaves Naphula unharmed since he is not a Misfit. Iruma, injured by his fall, suffers another vision of all his friends rejecting him for being a human and of Sullivan trying to return him to his parents. Despite knowing the visions are fake, he is paralyzed by fear of them coming true and losing his friends. A vision of Barbatos appears, but it only reminds him of the life threatening lessons she taught him. His courage returned, Iruma summons his bow and uses one of his two shots to shoot and destroy the visions, ending them. With renewed determination, Iruma decides to become the best demon he can and prove it to everyone by winning the festival.
57	13	"My Very Own Magic"; Transliteration: "Boku Dake no Majutsu" (Japanese: 僕だけの魔術)	Yūki Morita	Konomi Shugo	January 7, 2023
Now on the festivals third day, Kalego reveals whoever wins the festival will receive the title Young King, a potential successor to the Demon King. He also reveals one student still has 0 points. The Misfits panic as they realise it must be Iruma, but Asmodeus and Clara still believe in him. With his injured leg Iruma cannot climb the chasm walls, but Naphula appears and uses a fast growing vine to grow a ladder. Iruma still cannot climb with his injured leg, but he suddenly remembers how his human blood healed the Valley Guardian's baby. Adding a drop to the vine, it grows so explosively fast and enormous it breaks through the ground and towers over the entire forest, shocking the students and teachers. Iruma declares he still intends to win but Kalego angrily reminds him he still has 0 points. Meanwhile, Lead has retrieved the Vase of Endings, having defeated his own Genie by winning 100 difficult games. The referees announce the vase by itself is worth 20,000 should Lead want to betray Iruma, but the announcement also makes Lead a tempting target for other students. Lead attempts to hide while searching for Iruma, but runs into the seductive Elizabetta once again.
58	14	"Lead's Distress"; Transliteration: "Rīdo no Kunō" (Japanese: リードの苦悩)	Ayaka Tsujihashi	Konomi Shugo	January 14, 2023
Iruma finds Lead crying, revealing that Elizabetta robbed him of the Vase, not by seducing him but by telling him he is not her type and she doesn't like him, causing him to faint from shock. Knowing Elizabetta wouldn't be so needlessly cruel, Iruma suspects it was another hallucination, meaning Orobas stole the Vase. Lead confirms this with his training enhanced Sense Steal, learning the real Elizabetta is miles away in a secret hot-spring with Clara and Crocell. Crocell wishes to form a team with Elizabetta and Clara to invade Picero and Goemon's castle, steal their ingredient stockpile and claim the Young King title for herself. Picero, having no interest in fighting, decides to surrender to Crocell, but all the students sheltering in the castle decide to fight back. Having been trained in Gentleman Combat, Kamui leads the monsters in battle but they are all defeated by Goemon's enhanced Wind-Sword technique. Kamui summons boss class monsters as reinforcements and the battle continues. Nearby, Iruma, Lead, and Naphula watch the chaos in confused terror.
59	15	"The True Worth of the Archer"; Transliteration: "Yumidzukai no Shinka" (Japanese: 弓使いの真価)	Domon Ken'ichi	Nozomu Ōshima	January 21, 2023
Orobas trades the vase for 20,000 points, putting him in the lead. The castle repels the monsters so Elizabetta begins charming the male students to take them captive, while Clara disappears on her own. Iruma, Lead, and Naphula meet up with Elizabetta and confirm Orobas is targeting the Misfits. Crocell lends them her Blizzard-Wolves to find Clara when they realize Clara is his next target. Orobas, who has consistently been stuck in 2nd place and assumed to be a part of a cult that worships "The Second", is unbearably jealous of the Misfit's popularity and abilities, so wants to be better than them by becoming Young King. He briefly feels guilty over using Trauma on them, but his partner Ocho mentally manipulates him into forgetting his guilt. Orobas gives Clara visions of Iruma telling her she is annoying and only talks to her for her ability to provide free snacks, like the bullies she used to deal with. Iruma arrives and furiously destroys the vision with his last remaining arrow. Orobas is so angry he prepares to use his strongest level of Trauma to break their minds for the rest of their lives, but Asmodeus appears from nowhere and stops him.
60	16	"The End of the Harvest Festival"; Transliteration: "Shūkaku-sai no shūen" (Japanese: 収穫祭の終焉)	Masafumi Satō	Nozomu Ōshima	January 28, 2023
Asmodeus is disqualified for attacking Orobas, but proceeds to knock him out anyway and warns him he will return and kill him if he further harms Iruma or any other Misfit. The three agree to enjoy their reunion properly once the Festival ends with Asmodeus planning a party at his house. Ocho secretly retrieves Orobas, confident that with the Vase already submitted no one can stop Orobas becoming Young King, offering him extra rare plants for good measure. Iruma refuses to surrender, certain there is still a way to win, when out of nowhere, the referee Orobas submitted the Vase to re-appears, revealing himself to be Allocer in disguise. Allocer explains that while Jazz was disqualified for attacking Orobas, Allocer himself never attacked anyone, instead he posed as being disqualified to get access to the cameras watching the competition while still being a competitor. With help from the disqualified, they plotted revenge and have now stolen the Vase, robbing Orobas of victory. Allocer returns the Vase to Iruma, placing all the Misfits trust in hm. As the competition is almost over, the remaining Misfits are all proud of their high scores. With the Vase and the Seed in hand, Iruma and Lead are ready to grow the Legend Leaf.
61	17	"Legend Leaf"; Transliteration: "Rejendo Rīfu" (Japanese: 伝説の(レジェンド)リーフ)	Naoyoshi Kusaka	Kazuyuki Fudeyasu	February 4, 2023
Naphula uses his watering can to water the Leaf, but it also requires vast magic to grow. Iruma considers using Ifrit mode, but Alicred's magic is too drained. Clara gives the magic she accumulated from her Toy Box back and the Leaf blooms into an anticlimactic goofy face, just as the Festival ends; right as the Leaf bloomed, Iruma receives a vision of the Demon King Derkila. Clara and Naphula refuse their points so Iruma and Lead receive 50,000 each. However to everyone's surprise, Orobas is announced victor with 58,000, yet still feels unsatisfied by this. But then, Jazz suddenly points out the Leaf is worth 100,000, but the Vase is worth a separate 20,000. The judges confirm this, meaning Iruma and Lead actually receive 60,000 each and are the joint victors, reducing Orobas to third place. Orobas is content as this still breaks his curse of always coming in second place, and also helps him realize his hatred of the Misfits was masking his jealousy of their friendships. He apologizes to the Misfits and is forgiven by the whole school. Ameri reveals Naphula is a student council member and saving him from the vines was the secret third task to grow the Leaf, as only Naphula held the Rainbow Watering Can necessary for it to bloom. The Leaf, who can speak, reveals the tasks to make him bloom were actually tests of character to find the least evil demon to become the Young King. To honour the Young King, he announces a prize for every demon in attendance.
62	18	"Welcome Back"; Transliteration: "Okaeri" (Japanese: おかえり)	Kōsuke Shimotori	Kazuyuki Fudeyasu	February 11, 2023
The Leaf explodes, turning the forest into Cherry Blossoms as a permanent monument to the Young Kings. Iruma and Lead are promoted to Dalet, 4th rank. Orobas, Sabnock, and the Dorodoro brothers are promoted to Gimmel, 3rd rank, for their impressive scores. Picero and Goemon achieve Gimmel for protecting students in their castle. Crocell and Kamui achieve Gimmel for their success taming monsters. Elizabetta achieves Bet, 2nd rank, for the potential she showed as a powerful demoness. Barbatos praises Iruma on his success, while Lead is disappointed as Robin is nowhere to be found. At the afterparty, the Dorodoro brothers finally learn Sabnock and Asmodeus' master isn't Furfur. Orobas can barely remember his partner Ocho, who also somehow avoided the broadcast cameras. Iruma and Lead are given front-row thrones, with Iruma grabbing Clara and Asmodeus, refusing to let go. The rest of the Misfit Class join them in celebrating, where Crocell feels mortified by the things she did as the Monster Queen. Kalego is concerned by Orobas' amnesia and who manipulated him, but is distracted when Iruma summons him, in his fluffy owl form, so the Misfits can celebrate with him. After the conclusion, everyone returns home to their parents. Sullivan has something important to tell Iruma but delays until after celebrating his victory.
63	19	"The Instructors Banquet"; Transliteration: "Kyōshi-jin no Utage" (Japanese: 教師陣の宴)	Hisaya Takabayashi	Kazuyuki Fudeyasu	February 18, 2023
The Babyls teachers go out for drinks to celebrate, including Kalego forced by Balam to join. Robin, who is hosting the party, seats Momonoki next to Kalego, on whom she has a crush since he mentored her as a trainee. All the teachers agree Iruma is definitely the most impressive student. Robin shares his opinion students are like family, only for every teacher to ominously disagree; students are a treasure teachers must protect. Anyone who threatens that treasure will receive "Discipline". A flashback to the end of the festival reveals Ocho was an infiltrator from the Second Faith, a cult that worships the number 2, and that he manipulated Orobas into believing his curse of always coming in 2nd place was an omen. Robin, on Kalego's orders, found and shot Ocho non-fatally as a warning to the cult. Ocho reports to his master, Baal, about all he learned about the Misfit Class, including Iruma who he snuck a recording bug on. They discover through the recording device that Iruma is a human and Kiriwo, now Baal's subordinate, salivates with joy at this revelation that he will plunge Iruma into ultimate despair by eating him. Baal confirms the demon world will soon become very interesting. Meanwhile, Kalego and Balam leave it up to the unfortunate Robin to get the drunk teachers home safely.
64	20	"Bad Company"; Transliteration: "Akuyū" (Japanese: 悪友)	Ayaka Tsujihashi	Kazuyuki Fudeyasu	February 25, 2023
64	20	"Heartfelt Cooking Class"; Transliteration: "Magokoro Kukkingu Kyōshitsu" (Japanese: 真心クッキング教室)	Ayaka Tsujihashi	Kazuyuki Fudeyasu	February 25, 2023
Iruma visits Lead's home to play video games together. The two decide to stop using the honorific "boku" (casual friend) and begin using "ore" (close friend) instead. Lead reveals an erotic magazine to get Iruma to talk about what girls he likes, causing a commotion that accidentally awakens Lead's terminally unmarried sister, Shakky. Upon seeing Iruma she attempts to charm him but is banished to her room by Lead. Shakky is actually impressed seeing Lead is becoming a responsible adult who values his friends. The two boys then proceed to argue with each other over who is the "little brother" in their relationship. Iruma has resumed reading First Love Memories with Ameri again, beginning with a chapter on cooking. Ameri decides to make Iruma sweets as congratulations for winning the Harvest Festival and is dumbfounded when Iruma invites her to his house to cook. Opera is shocked to learn both Iruma and Ameri are abysmal cooks and steps in to prevent them poisoning themselves. After a harsh ordeal that leaves Opera mentally scarred, they are able to bake simple cookies. Iruma plans to give his to his friends and is surprised when Ameri gives hers to him for winning the festival. For his own safety, Opera point blank refuses to let them attempt to cook more complicated meals.
65	21	"Words for My Friends"; Transliteration: "Tomodachi e no Kotoba" (Japanese: トモダチへの言葉)	Natsumi Higashida	Kazuyuki Fudeyasu	March 4, 2023
After inviting Barbatos over for snacks, Sullivan reveals to her several high-ranking demons have been kidnapped by the Musashino Gang. He asks Barbatos to continue tutoring Iruma, then informs her Iruma is human. Barbatos is so shocked Sullivan offers to erase her memory, but she decides to keep the secret. Asmodeus invites Iruma and Clara to his home where Clara causes her usual chaos, until Asmodeus gloats that Clara is still Gimel, 3rd rank, so Clara gloats about playing with Iruma in her Toy Box. Iruma feels tremendous guilt he still hasn't told them he is human, when Asmodeus' mother, Amu, overhears his guilt about keeping secrets and assures him keeping secrets is not a bad thing, unless he feels he can't be their friend without telling them. Iruma instead tells them how much their friendship means to him, including how much they both truly helped him during the Harvest Festival. Privately, he hopes to tell them the truth one day. Back at school, the Misfits prepare for the Music Festival, their last chance to get all remaining Gimel's promoted to Dalet, as well as the Bet, 2nd rank, Elizabetta. However, Kalego shockingly reminds them of their other classmate who is still only Bet: Purson Soi, who this whole time has gone completely unnoticed by everybody.

=== Season 4 (2026) ===
No. overall	No. in season	Title	Directed by	Written by	Original release date
66	1	"The Other Demon in the Misfit Class"; Transliteration: "Abunōmaru Kurasu, Mō 1-ri no Akuma" (Japanese: 問題児(アブノーマル)クラス、もう1人の悪魔)	Ayaka Tsujihashi	Kazuyuki Fudeyasu	April 4, 2026
The Misfits plan for Elizabetta to be their star performer. Iruma feels they have forgotten something and Kalego again reminds them of Purson Soi's existence. Kalego explains Soi's bloodline ability is Detection Warding, allowing him to disappear completely. After some convincing Soi seemingly agrees to perform with Elizabetta, but then disappears. Iruma manages to find him and assures him it is alright to not stand out if he doesn't want to. Soi finally speaks, admitting he has social anxiety, but begins speaking so quickly Iruma can't understand. Soi is revealed to be from a spy family, and apart from their business selling detection warding tools, no one knows they exist. Since the disappearance of his brother, Soi has faced pressure to become family heir and live in permanent anonymity. To express his frustrations, Soi has been playing his trumpet on the school roof, becoming famous as anonymous musician Pixie. Soi realises Iruma saw him playing. He tries to disappear but Iruma grabs him and apologises for going against what he said about not standing out, but he really wants Soi in the festival so everyone can acknowledge his skills. Soi is surprised Iruma asked him to play for personal recognition instead of helping the Misfits, and finds himself agreeing to be in the festival.
67	2	"A Challenge to the Thirteen"; Transliteration: "13-ri no Chōsen" (Japanese: 13人の挑戦)	Ayaka Tsujihashi	Kazuyuki Fudeyasu	April 11, 2026
Purson reveals himself as Pixie. The Misfit's are amazed by how fast Purson can talk, and that coming from a spy family he knows all their personal secrets. Purson agrees to take part as long as he only helps with music. He is surprised the Misfits are excited by the challenge, then remembers they are Misfits for a reason. Despite hundreds of complaints, Amerie sends Ronove and Naphula to find out what all first years are planning, especially Iruma. Amerie reasons Ronove needs practise socialising with normal students, plus he can occasionally inspire others. Ronove visits the Misfits but finds them unable to decide on a performance. Ronove suggests they need something the audience won't be expecting, something they are excited to perform. Iruma wants something all thirteen Misfits can do together. Crocell suggests something dangerous; the Hell Dance, a dem-doll dance that requires six demons to perform the same dance completely in synch, a feat mentally painful for most demons due to their struggle to concentrate. If all thirteen Misfits manage it at the same time victory is almost guaranteed, but if even one of them falls out of synch the dance will fail, and some of them might actually be demoted in rank. The Misfits automatically agree this is the perfect choice for them.
68	3	"The Essence of a Dem-doll"; Transliteration: "Akudoro no Shinzui" (Japanese: アクドルの真髄)	Hiroki Nagashima	Kazuyuki Fudeyasu	April 18, 2026
Crocell arranges Purson as primary musician with Iruma on piano. Sabnock lends Iruma his piano and explains demon world pianos are magical and will help him play the songs as long as he can clearly imagine the tune. Elizabetta, Clara and Crocell are primary dancers with the remaining Misfits as backup dancers. Iruma struggles to learn piano, so Crocell enlists Kalego as Purson and Iruma's tutor. Kalego tortures them into learning Lilith's Carpet, a song named for Lilith, the most beautiful and famous succubus in history. With the dancers as characters from Lilith's story, it is Iruma's job to convey emotion of the prideful Lilith and the yearning of her suitors. Despite trying his hardest to express desire and seduction Iruma can only express sharing a fun meal together, earning Kalego's violent disapproval. The Misfit's utilise magical Copycat Handcuffs to help synchronise their movements, but Crocell sends the two most out of sync dancers to practise with each other, Clara and Asmodeus. This does not go well and they fear disappointing everyone else who are already dancing in sync. To increase their closeness, Asmodeus suggests he and Clara be radically honest with each other.
69	4	"We Can't See Him, But..."; Transliteration: "Mienai kedo" (Japanese: 見えないけど)	Zhe Liu	Kazuyuki Fudeyasu	April 25, 2026
After shouting what they don’t like about each other, Clara and Asmodeus realise the only thing they have in common is Iruma, since they wouldn’t have met without him. This leads to the revelation they must dance in sync so Iruma won’t be disappointed. Crocell is confused when Iruma plays Lilith’s Carpet delicately. Iruma reveals Kalego told him to approach the song like a love letter aimed at what Lilith truly wants, so Purson is portraying Lilith’s arrogant allure while Iruma portrays the hopes of her men. Purson is given a detection warding veil, so he can play on stage but maintain his anonymity. Purson begins to enjoy spending time with the Misfits. Purson’s father demands Purson quit school since performing on stage goes against their traditions. The Misfits are upset by Purson’s absence, even though Kalego points out keeping the Royal One will be easier without him. Kalego then surprises them by revealing Purson went missing, so he must leave the Misfits unsupervised to help look for him. The Misfit’s realise Kalego is hinting that Purson might be hiding nearby until the music festival, so they decide to practise as hard as they can, hoping Purson joins them on stage when they need him.
70	5	"Let's Have a Chat"; Transliteration: "Oshaberi" (Japanese: おしゃべり)	Tsurumi Mukaiyama	Nozomu Ōshima	May 2, 2026
With only one day left the Misfits start to panic, so Crocel shows them a dem-doll relaxation technique, shouting compliments at each other. After everyone goes home Iruma tricks Purson into revealing himself for a real chat. Purson is surprised the Misfits aren't angry but rather are worried about him. He admits he is proud to be a Purson and does not want to defy his father, but his time with the Misfits has been the most fun he ever had and he is desperate to play in the festival. They end up talking all night and Iruma concludes Purson belongs on the stage. Iruma falls asleep and awakens to a scolding from Opera as he is sleep deprived right before the festival. Opera force-feeds Iruma one of Balam's stamina tonics to keep him awake. The judges are revealed as Dem-doll agency owner Lady Kyupa, classical musician Meimei the Many-eared, and former 13 Crown and Demon King Derkila's personal musician Lord Amduscias. Amduscias turns out to have a grudge against Sullivan, since Derkila always preferred Sullivan over him. He is therefore intrigued that Iruma, Sullivan's grandson, opened the Royal One. Opera panics that Balam's tonic was too strong as Iruma floats around the garden hallucinating he is a butterfly, with only 5 hours until showtime.
71	6	"The Music Festival: Showtime!!"; Transliteration: "Ongaku-sai, Honban!!" (Japanese: 音楽祭、本番！！)	Ayaka Tsujihashi	Nozomu Ōshima	May 9, 2026
Amduscias is unimpressed with the still woozy Iruma, dubbing him a “blobby blue thing”. He informs the Misfits only Derkila is worthy of the Royal One, so he has no intention of letting them keep it. Listening to their heartbeats he diagnoses that all the Misfits have stage fright and have no chance of impressing him. He is surprised when their heartbeats all change to confidence when Iruma drunkenly claims Purson will be there. Of the six classes performing the Misfits learn they will be last. Class A perform a dramatic historical reading, led by Orobas. The Misfit’s feel nervous again but Iruma, now recovered, rallies them with his enthusiasm. The judges award Class A 12 out of a possible 18 points. Amduscias, who only gave them 3 points out of his potential 6, points out the lyrics were mistimed and some of them have sore throats from illnesses. Class C perform a combination rock/classical song. Purson is found by his mother who wants him to come home, but promises to support him if he chooses music over anonymity. She also admits she only really agrees with his father because she is still madly in love with him, disturbing Purson greatly. Class B perform a romantic opera, which Amduscias gives 4 points. The Misfits prepare to take their places.
72	7	"Lilith's Carpet"; Transliteration: "Ririsu・Kāpetto" (Japanese: リリス・カーペット)	Makoto Moriwaki	Nozomu Ōshima	May 16, 2026
Amduscias is irritated the whole school is excitedly looking forward to the Misfit's performance. Ameri is also nervous on Iruma's behalf. Lied suddenly rushes onto stage crying that Elizabetta has gone missing, shocking the crowd. The crowd realise this is part of their performance as all the boys begin arguing over her. Elizabetta appears upon a carpet of red roses and begins singing Lilith's Carpet with Iruma on the piano. Lilith desires love, and the performance continues through all the boys offering Lilith their love; the humble Flower Seller, followed by the sensual Snake Dancers, the Kind Warrior, the Passionate Knight, the Wise Scholar, the Selfish Prince and the Greedy Noble. None of them satisfies Lilith, and she is left alone and heartbroken. At the climax of the song everyone fears Purson will not join them, but he finally reveals himself and performs the finale on his trumpet with Lilith declaring she will keep searching for love. The audience goes wild that Pixie has finally revealed himself, that the Misfit's performance was heart wrenching and they pulled off the Hell Dance not with six, but a record breaking 13 people.
73	8	"Victory Salute"; Transliteration: "Shōri no Shukuhō" (Japanese: 勝利の祝砲)	Kenichirō Watanabe	Nozomu Ōshima	May 23, 2026
Kyupa and Meimei both give the Misfits six points. Amduscius gives them a one, blaming Iruma for his terrible piano playing. He curses him for having fun despite lacking skill, which reminds him painfully of Derkila. Amduscias suddenly remembers Derkila’s favourite sound was laughter, so he grudgingly awards them a six. Having won the music festival, the Misfits keep the Royal One. Amduscius borrows Purson’s trumpet to play them a victory salute, then promotes the entire Misfit class to 4th Rank Dalet. As a shocking surprise, he promotes Iruma to He, 5th Rank. Ameri congratulates Iruma over text. Kalego warns Iruma a first year achieving He is rare, so he should prepare for possible consequences. Purson’s father phones him and admits he was impressed with his musical talent, so he will not punish him for appearing in public, but his removal from Babyls is still final as he needs Purson to join the family business. Fed up, Purson yells at his baffled father and announces he will become the next head of the family and appear in public as a musician. His mother later consoles his father, sad that Purson shouted at him. To end the festival, Purson plays his trumpet as Pixie on the roof. Having realised Purson exists, the school realises there are actually thirteen Misfits, the same number as the 13 Crown’s.
74	9	"Behind Those Eyes"; Transliteration: "Hitomi no Oku" (Japanese: 瞳の奥)	Yūdai Ishikawa	Kazuyuki Fudeyasu	May 30, 2026
Asmodeus finds Kirio in the Magical Apparatus clubroom. As Kirio’s crimes were never made public, Asmodeus simply believes Kirio was absent for his illness. Kirio asks to see Iruma, but Asmodeus attacks him, revealing Kirio has insanity behind his eyes. Amduscias captures Wetoto of the Six Fingers inside Babyls, who asks if Amduscias wants to see Derkila again. Kirio announces he will expose Iruma’s secret and revel in his despair, then vanishes before Asmodeus can stop him. Six Fingers depart from Babyls, taking a willing Amduscias with them. Asmodeus does not tell Iruma about Kirio. Iruma returns home where Sullivan and Opera are waiting to celebrate. Alicred appears for the first time in weeks and explains since Iruma reached Dalet he has been strangely sleepy, until he reached He and suddenly awoke with more power and new abilities. Iruma is just glad he is back. Alicred reminds him they are not family or friends, but in the harsh netherworld they do rely on each other to survive. Iruma notices Alicred’s tail is no longer directly connected to his ring, so Alicred tries to run off to have some fun, but only makes it a few meters before he is dragged back, showing they are still bound together.
75	10	"Triple Love Squad"; Transliteration: "Daisuki Torio" (Japanese: 大好き軍団(トリオ))	Aiko Yamaguchi & Jiyū Amano	Kazuyuki Fudeyasu	June 6, 2026
The entire school is baffled when Asmodeus becomes crazy overprotective and covers Iruma in a flame barrier, not allowing anyone to approach him. Clara becomes feral from lack of Iruma and stalks the outside of the barrier like a beast. Asmodeus takes a short break to ask Balam advice, so Clara grabs Iruma and runs off with him. Iruma worries about Asmodeus, so Clara decides as they all love each other they are now the Triple Love Squad, and when one is in trouble the other two must help them. She decides Asmodeus needs a whole day with Iruma. Asmodeus returns from Balam, certain Kirio is now a Primal Demon, entirely consumed by selfish, destructive desires with no chance of recovery. Asmodeus is amazed to spend time without Clara around, shopping and having fun. Without Clara's constant noise Asmodeus realises Iruma is far braver than when they first met. He also wonders why Kirio called him clueless, and what secret of Iruma's he plans to expose. Iruma admits he doesn't feel like he should be He Rank yet, and yet he finds he wants to be promoted even higher. Asmodeus has a sudden vision of Iruma climbing all the way to the top of demon society, and decides Kirio can not possibly pose a threat to Iruma after all.
76	11	"Best Friend Meeting"; Transliteration: "Shin'yū Kaigi" (Japanese: シンユー会議)	Takehito Nakagomi	Kazuyuki Fudeyasu	June 13, 2026
76	11	"Lead's Flirting Meeting"; Transliteration: "Rīdo no Ichakora Kaigi" (Japanese: リードのイチャコラ会議)	Takehito Nakagomi	Kazuyuki Fudeyasu	June 13, 2026
Asmodeus gives the Misfits a biased explanation of Friends and Best Friends, confusing them and causing a brawl. When they calm down Iruma gives a proper explanation, with the Misfits realising they have been friends all along. They also realise that, as most of them have other friends, then every Misfit must be Iruma's best friend, which Asmodeus and Clara reject. Picero and Goemon are invited to a mixer, as many girls wish to meet them. This causes Lead to want to finally find out if Elizabetta likes him. He enlists the Misfit boys for advice and Goemon suggests finding a way to spend time together. Walter Park is rejected as they have already been there. Iruma suggests Aqua Case where he took Ameri, but Lead insists Elizabetta would think he wants to see her bikini. Lead accuses everyone of being too close to Elizabetta, especially Iruma who is close to so many girls he practically has a harem. Hearing this, the boys vote Iruma guilty. Elizabetta suddenly interrupts, having been told by Clara that Lead wants her phone number. Lead faints from joy. Despite possessing her number, Lead has no idea what to say and calls another meeting of the boys to try and write his first message.
77	12	"One-Year Distance and One-Centimetre Distance"; Transliteration: "1-Nenkan to 1-Senchi no Kyori" (Japanese: 1年間と1センチの距離)	Natsumi Higashida	Kazuyuki Fudeyasu	June 20, 2026
Once a year, noble demons gather at the formal dance Devilum, and within the Devilum is an exclusive gathering of elite demons, the Deviculum. As a child, Ameri made it her goal to attend Deviculum and dance with Henri. In the present, Ameri receives her Deviculum invitation. Lead asks Iruma if he is friends with Ameri, but Iruma is unsure. Ameri looks forward to her next reading session with Iruma, as they have both been busy lately. Unfortunately, Deviculum is on the same day, and Henri warns her failing to attend could harm her future career. Ameri wonders if she and Iruma might have been closer were she not one year older than him. The elites are impressed Ameri is already 6th Rank Vav and Council President. Ameri is shocked when Iruma suddenly appears as Sullivan's guest and asks her to dance. Henri is furious Iruma stole Ameri's first dance from him. Iruma confesses he never learned to dance, but Ameri still deeply enjoys teaching him. Iruma admits how deeply he respects her ambition, which has inspired his own goals, so he wishes to become closer to her. Ameri hugs him and admits she feels the same, embarrassing them both. The next day Ameri is noticeably happier, but Iruma admits to Lead he remains unsure if he and Ameri are friends.
78	13	"Suzuki Iruma's Exorcibration"; Transliteration: "Suzuki Iruma "Gōma no Gi"" (Japanese: 鈴木入間"降魔の儀")	Kōsuke Fujimoto	Kanichi Katō	June 27, 2026
Balam shares a childhood memory to teach Iruma survival. Balam's naive curiosity towards living creatures once led a Horned Heron to scar his face for approaching her eggs. Rescued by his parents, Balam learned a crucial lesson about respecting living creatures, and he warns the overly fearless Iruma to remember that his life is precious and the Netherworld is a dangerous place. When Iruma mentions his birthday was October 4th, a shocked Balam alerts Opera, who informs everyone they missed Iruma's birthday a whole three weeks ago. The next morning, everyone kidnaps Iruma to the Gabrian Chapel for his Exorcibration, the demon equivalent of a birthday party. Even a reluctant Kalego is forced to attend when Opera has Iruma summon him in his owl form. Iruma is deeply moved to learn the formal event is a way of thanking him for existing, complete with a fire ceremony and gifts. He bursts into tears, explaining that no one has ever celebrated his birthday before. Determined to reciprocate, Iruma insists on learning everyone else's birthdays. The Exorcibration concludes with Iruma blowing out a massive fireball representing everyone's love and respect for him, though extinguishing it takes some time due to its size.
79	14	"Infiltrate the Teacher Dorms!"; Transliteration: "Kyōshi Ryō e Sen'nyu Seyo!" (Japanese: 教師寮へ潜入せよ！)	Katsuya Yamamoto	Kanichi Katō	July 4, 2026
79	14	"A New Member Joins the Girls?!"; Transliteration: "Onagokai ni Shin Menbā!?" (Japanese: 女子会に新メンバー!?)	Katsuya Yamamoto	Kanichi Katō	July 4, 2026
Iruma learns the Babyl's teachers live in their own dormitory, so Sullivan arranges a tour for him. Kalego takes the opportunity to fully inspect the dorm, causing teachers to panic. Professor Marbas reveals his young relative is joining Babyls soon. Kalego doles out punishments for poor cleaning, video games, unsanctioned pets and building damage. Iruma is glad he got to see the teachers outside of normal class. Iruma later sees the teachers suddenly involved in serious work. Kalego admits while they are a troublesome group, they are still teachers at Babyls. Iruma wonders if he could be a teacher and what Kalego was like as a student. Kalego forbids him from asking Opera about him. Naphula, who appears as a normal girl beneath her height-reducing robe, is asked by Ameri to join her in Girls Group, without her robe. Elizabetta and Clara are amazed Naphula is so beautiful. Elizabetta wants to talk about female fashion to impress boys, which focuses on horns, tails, clothes and shoes. Having only worn her robe before, Naphula is unused to cute clothing. Ameri insists dresses should be reserved for special occasions. After the party Naphula goes out without her usual robe and is amazed Iruma still recognises her. The next day she returns to using her robe, but Ameri notes she has added a ribbon accessory.
80	15	"The Laws of the Netherworld Dictate That One Takes After Their Master"; Transliteration: "Aruji ni Niru wa Makai no Setsuri" (Japanese: 主(あるじ)に似るは魔界の摂理)	Ayaka Tsujihashi	Kanichi Katō	July 11, 2026
80	15	"Even Among Those Who Are Close"; Transliteration: "Shitashiki Naka ni mo" (Japanese: 親しき仲にも)	Ayaka Tsujihashi	Kanichi Katō	July 11, 2026
Jazz harbors an embarrassing secret: his Split-wolf familiar, which should be an impressively savage monster, manifests as a cute, useless dog. When Iruma catches them training, Jazz explains that familiars reflect their master's true personality, so its appearance is humiliating for him. Jazz admits he previously considered breaking the familiar contract, but guilt stopped him. Iruma isn't surprised, noting that Jazz is loyal and kind, and predicts Split-wolf will prove useful. Proving Iruma right, snake scales appear on the creature's tails, signalling growth potential. Jazz is ultimately impressed when the Split-wolf picks Iruma’s pocket to steal snacks, proving Split-wolf is truly like him after all. To practice for a promised game with Iruma, Asmodeus inexplicably challenges Lied to a gaming duel. Lied wonders about Asmodeus's childhood, prompting Asmodeus to admit that being gifted meant he spent his youth training instead of making friends, making social interactions difficult even today. Lied offers to help, noting Asmodeus already acts normally around Iruma and Clara. After meticulous planning, Asmodeus invites Iruma and Clara to an arcade and for burgers. Although they completely derail his strict schedule with their usual chaotic behaviour, everyone thoroughly enjoys themselves, leaving Asmodeus overjoyed when Iruma asks to hang out again another day.
81	16	"A Misfit Casual Gathering"; Transliteration: "Abunōmaru na Bureikō" (Japanese: 問題児(アブノーマル)な無礼講)	Tsumuri Mukaiyama	Konomi Shugo	July 18, 2026
81	16	"Netherworld Devotee"; Transliteration: "Makai no Kenshin-sha" (Japanese: 魔界の献身者)	Tsumuri Mukaiyama	Konomi Shugo	July 18, 2026
As the Netherworld prepares for the New Year on the 1st of Undecember, Iruma hosts a party for the Misfits. Chaos ensues when everyone, except Lied, drinks Relaxcider, which while non-alcoholic causes drunk-like symptoms if not diluted with water. Lied tries to restore order but succumbs to drinking after a request from Elizabetta, nearly confessing his love to her. The party spirals further into chaos when Clara summons more bottles from her pockets. Iruma hopes they can share a real drink together in the future. The next morning, a strict Opera forces everyone to write apology essays for the mess. Worried about Iruma’s recent recklessness, Sullivan tasks Opera with teaching him proper behaviour. Through a demanding day of chores, Iruma realizes how much Opera does for them. Opera explains that Security Devils like himself must protect their master's life and status, adding that because demons lack natural compassion, he must constantly prove his worth to Sullivan. Opera expresses hope to serve Iruma in the future if he stays in the Netherworld, which Iruma happily accepts. Confident Iruma has learned his lesson, Opera reveals an invitation to the 13 Crowns dinner, as Iruma is one of several promising demons nominated as a Demon King candidate.
82	17	"The Great Heroes Gather"; Transliteration: "Tsudoishi Eiketsu" (Japanese: 集いし英傑)	Shinpei Nagano	Konomi Shugo	July 25, 2026
Nine of the Thirteen Crowns gather at the Tower of Babel, though Beelzebuth is concerned that four Crowns are absent or missing. To fill a vacancy, Beelzebuth, Sullivan, Belial, and Levi propose promoting Barbatos. Surprising the others, Sullivan, Belial, and Levi express no desire to become the next Demon King, instead nominating their three grandchildren. While Sullivan nominates Iruma, whose achievements are already famous, Levi and Belial nominate Levi's grandson Leidzi, Student Commander of Levialon Underwater Academy, who aims to rule the Netherworld with absolute authority, and Belial's grandson Raspberry, a prodigy from Jackapo Subtyrannic Institute, who conquered 62 of the Institutes 66 floors as a first year and became the youngest member of the elite Netherpool. Leidzi and Raspberry are confused by Iruma, who is so plain looking they mistook him for a servant. When Baal objects to nominating mid-rank teenagers as Demon King, Sullivan explains that choosing a candidate from the existing Crowns would cause massive conflict. Selecting a child would allow all the Crowns to mentor and influence the future Demon King. Excited by the possibility, the remaining Crowns are invited to submit their own nominees. Baal demands an immediate interview with the three existing candidates to assess their potential.
83	18	"Give the Youth All the Nutrients They Need"; Transliteration: "Wakaba ni wa Ōinaru Kate o" (Japanese: 若葉には大いなる糧を)	Zie Liu	Konomi Shugo	August 1, 2026
83	18	"Crossing the Sunbeams Shining Through the Trees"; Transliteration: "Komorebi Mataide" (Japanese: こもれびばたいで)	Zie Liu	Konomi Shugo	August 1, 2026
When asked what kind of Demon King they would be, Leidzi promises merciless law, Raspberry champions survival of the fittest, and Iruma chooses to make the netherworld fun like Babyls. During the actual dinner, Henri wonders why Sullivan wants a human to rule. Later, Sullivan reassures Iruma that becoming Demon King is just an option, but he can still choose his own future. He reveals the interview was a trick; as a demon's true nature shows while eating, allowing the Crowns to judge them secretly. The Crowns were amused by Leidzi's messy eating and Raspberry's odd food combinations. However, Iruma stole the spotlight by becoming the first guest in history to request seconds, eating so much that Henri believed he could rival Crown Behemolt the Glutton Lord, intriguing Baal with his sheer greed. Iruma, Asmodeus and Clara discuss becoming Second Years in a few weeks, including more subjects and practical lessons outside the classroom. Clara is most interested in meeting the new First Years, so they roleplay how to be good Senpai to their juniors. Iruma and Asmodeus struggle, but inexplicably Clara is a natural Senpai, having grown up with younger siblings. Iruma is confident second year will be as fun as first year. Soon after Kalego is furious to discover them fast asleep on the lawn, improper behaviour for future Second Years, and yells at them.
84	19	"The Dem-doll Games"; Transliteration: "Akudoru Dai Un Dō Kai" (Japanese: アクドル大武闘会)	Kenichirō Watanabe	Mio Inoue	August 23, 2026
Out of nowhere, Crocel asks Iruma and Lied to perform with her at the Dem-doll Games as "Irumi" and "Lindy." Though surprised to learn Crocel is Kuromu, and horrified by her request, Lied is convinced when he learns his idol, the rock dem-doll Gyari, is competing. Meanwhile, Crocel's manager Mal introduces their new fourth member, Melun. Crocel’s nervous younger sister also attends to show support. Gyari barges in to declare she will force Kuromu to retire, then marry her. The exasperated Crocel reveals her habit of proposing is why she and Gyari are no longer part of the same dem-doll band. Melun reveals Gyari already seduced her into switching sides, leaving Kuromu without the four members needed to compete in the games. Gyari confesses her jealousy over Irumi previously performing with Kuromu, then hands Lied an autograph that nearly convinces him to join her too. Just in time, Ameri arrives on arena security duty and freezes up seeing Iruma dressed as Irumi again. Before she can recover, Kuromu drags her into a revealing dem-doll outfit as their emergency fourth member. The games begin broadcasting live across the Netherworld, shock Clara and Asmodeus to see Iruma in a dress, on television too.
85	20	"Team Devimuse"; Transliteration: "Chīmu Debimusu" (Japanese: チームデビムス)	Ryūta Yamamoto	Mio Inoue	August 30, 2026
Unknown to Iruma, the games are being watched by almost everyone he knows in the Netherworld, who all know straight away that Irumi is Iruma in a dress. Ameri is furious at being forced to participate, believing she is neither experienced enough or pretty enough, though she agrees after Iruma calls her cute in her dem-doll outfit. Ameri is confused when she is told part of the games is to be cute, so victory is not always dependant on getting first place in the events. Rejecting this, Ameri comes in first place in numerous events, making her unexpectedly popular with the audience. Henri happens to glance at the television while doing paperwork and sees Ameri on stage. Lied volunteers to take part in the Tail Tug o' War but finds himself facing Beeber, a rare male Dem-dol much larger and more muscular than himself. Unaware Lied is also male, Beeber tries to flirt his way to an easy victory, only for Lied to furiously bury his head in the sand for denying him a chance to tail-wrestle with a cute girl. Realising every member of team Devimuse is a Babyls student, Kalego begins drinking strong alcohol, hoping to forget the horrors he is witnessing. Iruma steps in to take part in the target shooting game.
86	21	"The Tycoon and the Jewel"; Transliteration: "Fugō to Hōseki" (Japanese: 富豪と宝石)	Natsumi Higashida	Mio Inoue	September 6, 2026
Iruma wins the shooting game with his magic bow, prompting Gyari to demand a showdown. Kuromu interrupts, declaring she will marry "Irumi" instead of Gyari. Privately, a horrified Iruma learns Kuromu only said this to antagonize Gyari. Kuromu explains Gyari is like the Greedy Noble from Lilith's Carpet, she only wants what she cannot have, and winning Kuromu would make her lose her motivation as a Dem-dol. Thus, Kuromu will always reject her to force Gyari to strive for greatness. During the cavalry battle, Gyari admits that being denied Kuromu has fueled a mad obsession. Their vicious clash is disrupted when Chima overcomes her shyness to shout support and nearly gets crushed. Iruma, Lied, and Ameri save Chima, but the distraction allows Gyari to steal Kuromu's ribbon and claim her first victory over Kuromu. Upset, Kuromu reveals she promised to retire and marry Gyari if she lost. Now at a major disadvantage, her team must win the final live concert, Gyari's specialty, rock music. After Iruma points out a tearful, apologetic Chima, Kuromu comforts her and realizes that by relying on her friends, victory is still within reach.
87	22	"The Proud Songstress"; Transliteration: "Gōman no Utahime" (Japanese: 傲慢な歌姫)	Ayaka Tsujihashi	Mio Inoue	September 13, 2026
Iruma notices Chima’s eyes are an even brighter blue than Kuromu's. The rock music finalists are announced as Teams Beeber, Nenette, Devi-Muse, and Gyari. Gyari shocks the crowd by interrupting Beeber to perform her only song, which she never sings the same way twice, preferring to sing by instinct. Her powerful performance intimidates Beeber and Nenette, but Devi-Muse boldly steals the stage. Aided by Alicred's mental manipulation, they debut an aggressive "Evil Cycle" look that wows the audience with its cute-yet-cool vibe. At the awards, Kuromu and Gyari tie for Most Valuable Dem-doll, while Devi-Muse wins the overall games. Realizing her foolishness, Gyari formally confesses to Kuromu, resolving to become a woman worthy of her love. At the after-party, "Evil-Iruma" makes several Dem-dolls swoon, including Ameri, though he insists he is beyond embarrassed, he just cannot physically show it while in his "Evil Cycle". Lied is frustrated he only attracts the male Beeber. Believing Iruma is a girl and Kuromu's fiancée, Gyari decides she will marry Iruma too, sparking Kuromu's fury. Following the midnight countdown to Undecember, Iruma wakes up believing everything was just a wild dream, until his friends confirm he actually won the Dem-doll games on live television.
88	23	"The Road to the Demon King"; Transliteration: "Maō e no Michi" (Japanese: 魔王への道)	Kōsuke Fujimoto	Nozomu Ōshima	September 20, 2026
As a Demon King candidate, Iruma asks Sabnock for guidance. Sabnock shares Derkila's biography and his favorite tale, the "Pincushion War," where Derkila stopped a battle using his own body to prevent casualties. Inspired, Iruma realizes he must face an issue he has been avoiding. This prompts Sabnock to confront his own past. He returns home to retrieve a book for Iruma, discovering his sister Sylvia passed her exams to attend Babyls. His father, Sabzan, briefly appears only to declare Sabnock will never become Demon King, reopening old wounds from when their misunderstandings drove Sabnock to leave home. Meanwhile, Sabzan’s friend Baal secretly offers to nominate Sabnock as a fourth Demon King candidate alongside Raspberry, Leidzi, and Iruma. Sabnock refuses, insisting he will earn the title through his own efforts rather than family influence, especially while competing against his rival Iruma. Baal instead convinces him to meet with members of the 13 Crowns. After acquiring a powerful spear from Sabzan, Baal is warned by the master weaponsmith to stay away from Sabnock. Baal departs to reunite with the Six Fingers.
89	24	"The Most Extravagant Farewell Party"; Transliteration: "Ichiban Gōkana Hanamuke o" (Japanese: 一番豪華な餞を)	Ayaka Tsujihashi & Aiko Yamaguchi	Kazuyuki Fudeyasu	September 27, 2026
Barbatos is shocked when her family head wants the archer dem-doll Irumi to become part of their archer family by marrying Professor Robin. Knowing "Irumi" is actually Iruma, Barbatos beats him up for using his bow on television, but also gifts him a feather earring for reaching Rank He and making her proud. Meanwhile, other tutors bestow jewellery upon their students: Vepar to Picero and Goemon, Mr. Hat to Kuromu and Kamui, Furfur to Jazz and Schneider, and Raim to Clara and Elizabetta. The next day, Iruma learns Asmodeus received jewelry from his mother, Sabnock from Baal, Lied from Robin, and Purson from Amduscias. Unknown to the Misfits, the adults secretly plot to push the Misfits toward greater power. As second year begins, Sullivan gives Iruma detection-warding glasses. At school, new student Eita (Eiko's younger brother) panics from the excitement of seeing the Misfits. A disguised Iruma kindly comforts him, sharing how nervous he was on his own first day. Eita is stunned when the Misfits gather around, realizing his savior is Young King Iruma, leader of the Misfits. Eiko fumes that Eita spoke to Iruma first. Elsewhere, Baal schemes with Six Fingers as the Misfits face their new school year.
