= Galeophobia =

Fear of sharks

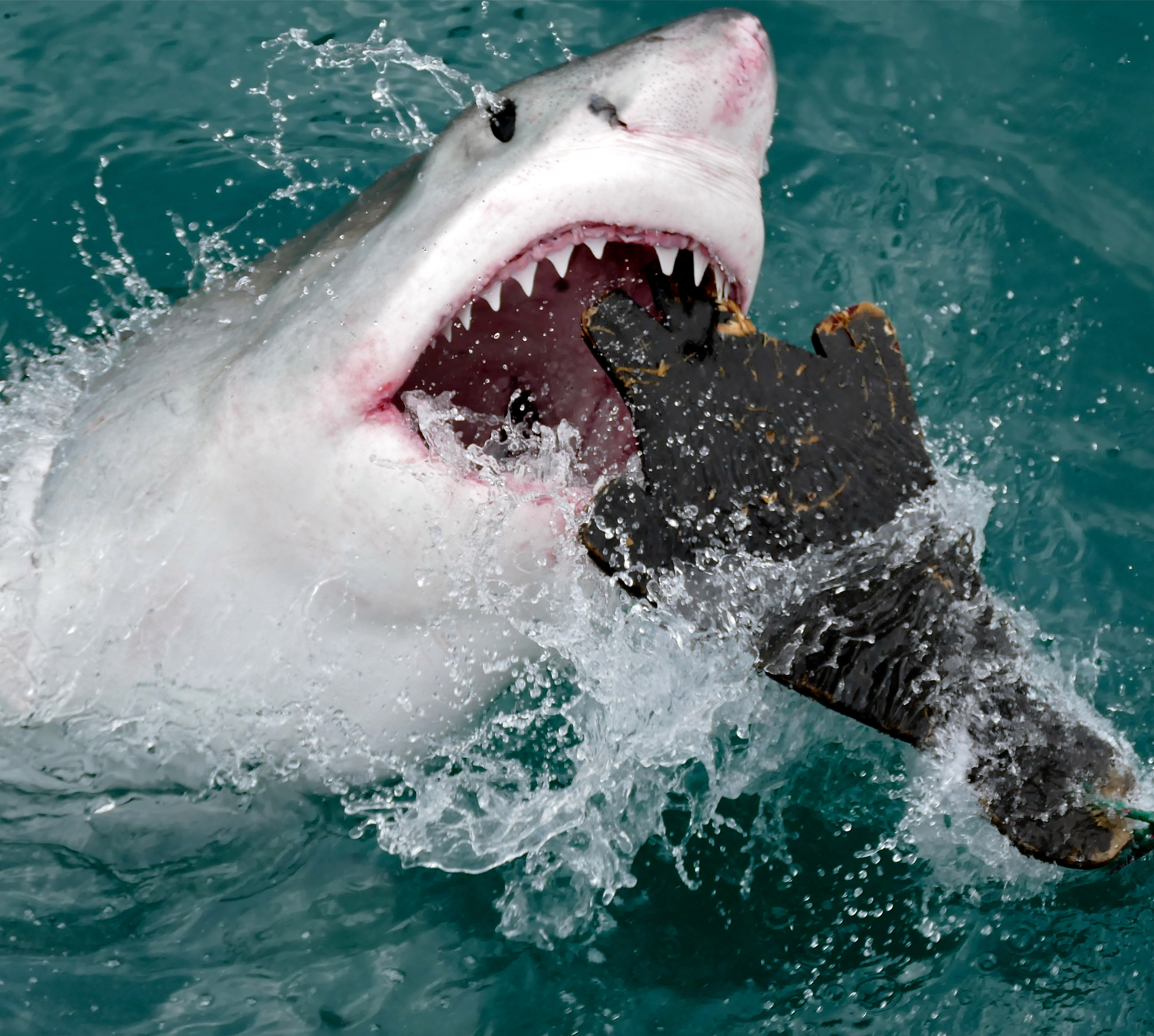
A great white shark feeding on a seal decoy

Galeophobia or selachophobia is the medical term for a fear of sharks. The name galeophobia derives from the Greek language with galeos meaning shark and phobia meaning fear. This phobia is diagnosed using DSM-5 criteria and is characterized by a patient showing marked fear or anxiety about sharks that leads to severe impairment of their quality of life. Although it is not known exactly how many people have been diagnosed with galeophobia, a study conducted in 2015 revealed that just over half (51%) of Americans are absolutely terrified of sharks.

== Causes ==
The fear of sharks, while perpetrated by the media in recent decades, has been around for all of humanity. Galeophobia is a primal instinct. The fear of sharks stems from humans' attempt to avoid sharks, which was essential to our survival as a species over hundreds of thousands of years. The physical aspects of sharks, particularly the great white shark, have been noted as strong reasons why people fear these animals. Individuals with galeophobia typically see sharks as a threat to their life. The rows of sharp teeth and huge jaws have been reported as "diabolical", "gruesome", and "terrifying" by those who suffer from the phobia. Another aspect of the fear stems from territorial "violations" by sharks. Sharks are said to encroach and intrude on areas where humans visit, including beaches and fishing waters.

Despite the statistically low risk of shark attacks, the possibility of human-shark interactions contributes to galeophobia. In 2018, PETA released a study that revealed humans killed approximately 100 million sharks worldwide during 2018, whereas sharks killed a total of just five humans in that same period. While the phobia may not be statistically rational, humans are wired to fear any animal that poses a threat, setting off a fight or flight reaction.

== Symptoms and treatment ==
Galeophobia is characterized by an overwhelming and persistent fear of sharks. Those experiencing this condition may lack the ability to rationally perceive the danger sharks pose to them, leading them to participate in behaviors to avoid these animals. This phobia typically results in symptoms including a rapid heart rate, shortness of breath, shaking, hyperventilation, nausea, and dizziness. Feelings of intense anxiety and a loss of control, insomnia, and nightmares may also occur. The thought of a shark, viewing a photo or video of a shark, or seeing a shark in real life may trigger these symptoms. The symptoms of this phobia can become extreme, leading to fear and panic at the sight of a body of water. These symptoms must exist for at least six months to achieve a clinical diagnosis.

There are many methods available for treating galeophobia, several of which involve the help of a mental health professional. These treatment options include exposure and response therapy, cognitive behavioral therapy (CBT), hypnotherapy, and medication in conjunction with other therapies. Of these options, exposure and response therapy and cognitive behavioral therapy are recommended. Exposure and response therapy will slowly expose patients to fear stimulus in order to extinguish avoidant behaviors and fear toward sharks. Cognitive behavioral therapy will focus on reducing the reaction to one's phobia by altering one's thoughts toward sharks.

== Human-shark interactions ==
Popular media has historically portrayed sharks as a significant threat to humans, but many marine biologists and animal rights activists argue that sharks are misunderstood as a species.

Occasionally referred to as "living fossils", there is fossil evidence for the existence of sharks that dates back to 450 million years ago, during the Late Ordovician Period. Throughout their evolution, sharks have undergone periods of diversification and there are now more than 500 species of sharks in the ocean. Sharks' diets vary depending on the size and habitat of the particular species. The most common prey across shark species are fish, but larger sharks are known to also prey on semi-aquatic marine animals, such as seals and sea lions. Despite their reputation as a "man-eating" species, scientific literature suggests that humans are not typical prey for sharks.

Research on the behavior of sharks during interactions with humans suggests that most shark attacks, even those that are fatal, stem from the shark's curiosity or confusion. Sharks may bite surfers or swimmers in an attempt to identify a foreign object in their environment.

Humans pose a comparatively greater risk to sharks than sharks do to humans. One attempt to mitigate the risk of shark attacks is shark culling: the government-enforced hunting and killing of sharks. The negative reputation of sharks may contribute to the appeal of shark culling. Marine conservationists argue that shark culling is a misinformed and ineffective mitigation technique. Presently, there is no evidence to suggest that the practice of shark culling reduces the rates of shark attacks.

== Galeophobia in popular culture ==
Popular culture also advances galeophobia and influences people's attitudes by exaggerating the dangers sharks pose. Sharks are a frequent subject of popular press coverage, but are rarely covered in a positive light. A 2012 Conservation Biology article looked at hundreds of examples of sharks being written about in major U.S. or Australian newspapers. The authors found that more than half of all articles about sharks in major papers from 2000 to 2010 were about a shark bite; only 11% even mentioned shark conservation.

According to psychologist Gabriella Hancock, who is working with the Shark Lab at Cal State Long Beach, people aren't born being afraid of sharks. "We're not innately afraid of sharks ... Five-month-old babies were not afraid of sharks. So it appears as though our fear of them is learned and socially reinforced." Moreover, for most of history, sharks were generally considered harmless and the "average bather knew or cared little about sharks". However, this started to change starting in the 1960s and 1970s.

=== Jaws ===
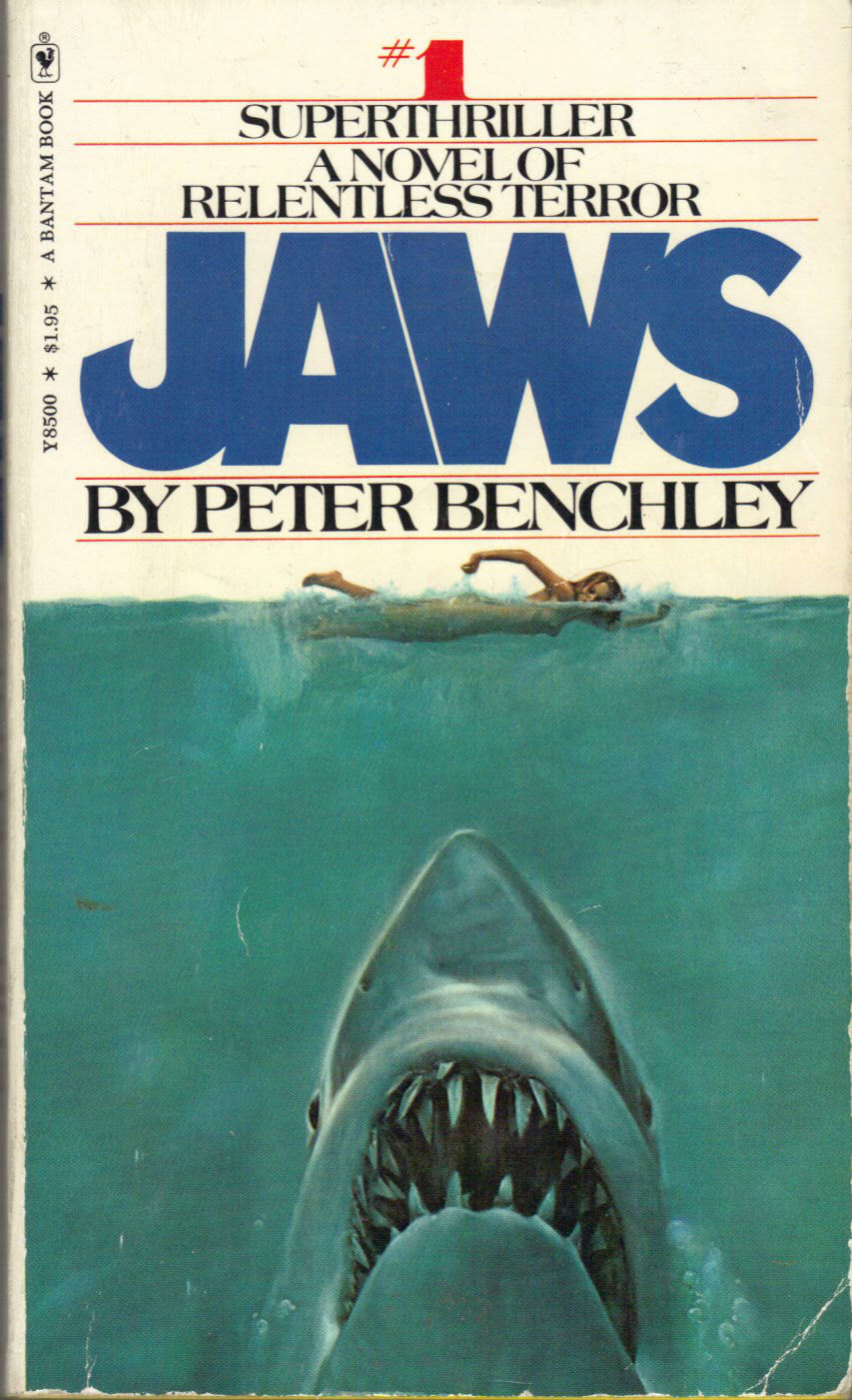
Jaws 1st edition 1974 by Peter Benchley

Movies like Jaws, which was released in 1975, popularized the idea of sharks as man-eating predators and fueled the fear of sharks. The movie was a box office success and became a cultural phenomenon, spawning three sequels and helping cement the image of the killer shark in popular culture. Upon its release, the "movie "generated an unprecedented audience response of excitement and terror."

Scientists have referred to the irrational fear that sharks intentionally attack humans as the "Jaws effect". The film's portrayal of sharks as relentless, predatory creatures that attack humans without provocation is one of the main reasons why Jaws is often cited as a key factor in advancing galeophobia. According to phobia specialist Christopher Paul Jones, individuals he has encountered with galeophobia, often cite films like Jaws as the basis of their fear, since most people have not seen a shark in the wild.

Peter Benchley, the author of the 1974 book publicly apologized for the impact his book and movie have had on the shark population—due in part by increasing the fear of sharks. In addition, Steven Spielberg, the director of the 1975 film Jaws said he "truly regrets" how the bloodthirsty portrayal of great white sharks in his 1975 film Jaws contributed to a sharp decline in the animals' population.

=== Shark Week ===
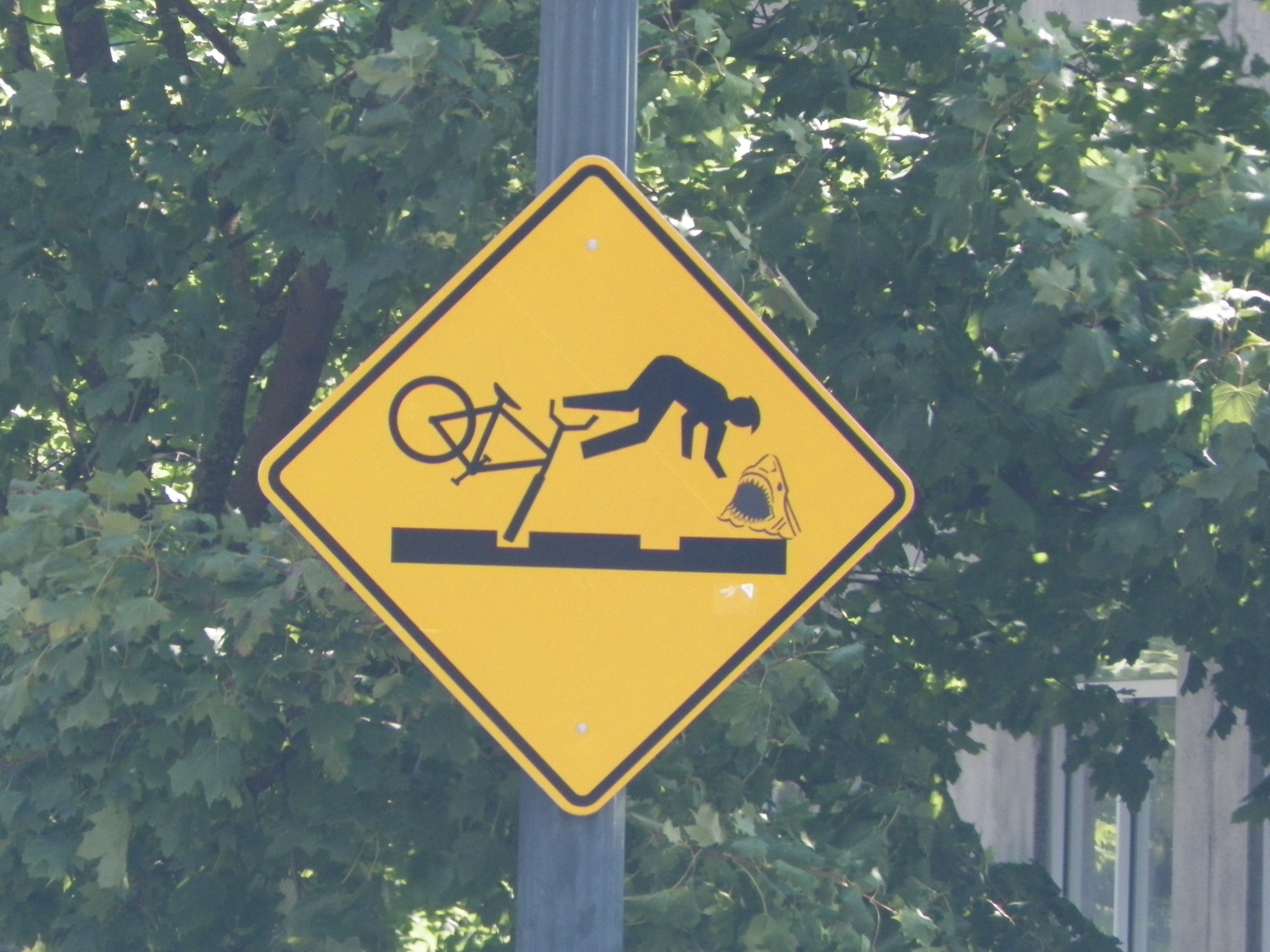
Promotional Shark Week ad highlighting irrational fear of sharks

TV shows have also contributed to the fear of sharks. Reality shows such as Shark Week, which airs on the Discovery Channel, have been popular since its inception in 1988, and have played a role in advancing galeophobia. The show features segments on shark attacks, shark behavior, and conservation efforts, often with sensationalist titles and imagery. Harry Baker of Marine Madness says, dozens of questionable documentaries and long-running TV campaigns, like Shark Week, "have prioritized maximum entertainment value and stoking fear at the expense of including scientific data and highlighting important conservation issues".

News coverage of shark attacks also contributes to galeophobia. Whenever a shark attack occurs, it is often covered by local and national news outlets, leading to increased fear and anxiety among swimmers and beachgoers. While shark attacks are statistically rare, the media coverage of these events amplifies their impact, making them seem more frequent than they actually are and enhancing perceived risk from sharks and increase anxiety about sharks among the public.

== See also ==
- Fear of fish
