= Fear of fish =

Fear of traditional and non traditional fish

Ichthyophobia
- Other names: Galeophobia
- Pronunciation: /ˌɪkθioʊˈfoʊbiə/
- Specialty: Psychology

Fear of fish or ichthyophobia ranges from cultural phenomena such as fear of eating fish, fear of touching raw fish, or fear of dead fish, up to irrational fear (specific phobia). Selachophobia, or galeophobia, is the specific fear of sharks.

== Etymology ==
The term ichthyophobia comes from the Greek ἰχθῦς - ichthus, meaning "fish" and φόβος - phobos, "fear". Galeophobia comes from the Greek γαλεός - galeos, "small shark".

== Phobia ==
Ichthyophobia is described in Psychology: An International Perspective as an "unusual" specific phobia. Both symptoms and remedies of ichthyophobia are common to most specific phobias.

American psychologist John B. Watson, a renowned name in behaviorism, describes an example, quoted in many books in psychology, of conditioned fear of a goldfish in an infant and a way of unconditioning of the fear by what is now called graduated exposure therapy:

Try another method. Let his brother, aged four, who has no fear of fish, come up to the bowl and put his hands in the bowl and catch the fish. No amount of watching a fearless child play with these harmless animals will remove the fear from the toddler. Try shaming him, making a scapegoat of him. Your attempts are equally futile. Let us try, however, this simple method. Place the child at meal time at one end of a table ten or twelve feet long, and move the fish bowl to the extreme other end of the table and cover it. Just as soon as the meal is placed before him remove the cover from the bowl. If disturbance occurs, extend your table and place the bowl still farther off, so far away that no disturbance occurs. Eating takes place normally, nor is digestion interfered with. Repeat the procedure on the next day, but move the bowl a little nearer. In four or five days the bowl can be brought right up to the food tray without causing the slightest disturbance. Then take a small glass dish, fill it with water and move the dish back, and at subsequent meal times bring it nearer and nearer to him. Again in three or four days the small glass dish can be put on the tray alongside of his milk. The old fear has been driven out by training, unconditioning has taken place, and this unconditioning is permanent.

In contrast, radical exposure therapy was used successfully to cure a man with a "life affecting" fish phobia on the 2007 documentary series, The Panic Room.

== Cultural phenomenon ==
Historically, the Navajo people were described as being ichthyophobic, due to their aversion to fish. However, this was later recognised as a cultural or mythic aversion to aquatic animals, and not a psychological condition.

== Fear of eating fish ==
The Journal of the American Medical Association have published a research paper addressing the fears of eating fish among those who are concerned about contaminants, such as mercury, becoming accumulated in their food.

== See also ==
- List of phobias
