= Fear of trains =

Phobia of trains and railway travel

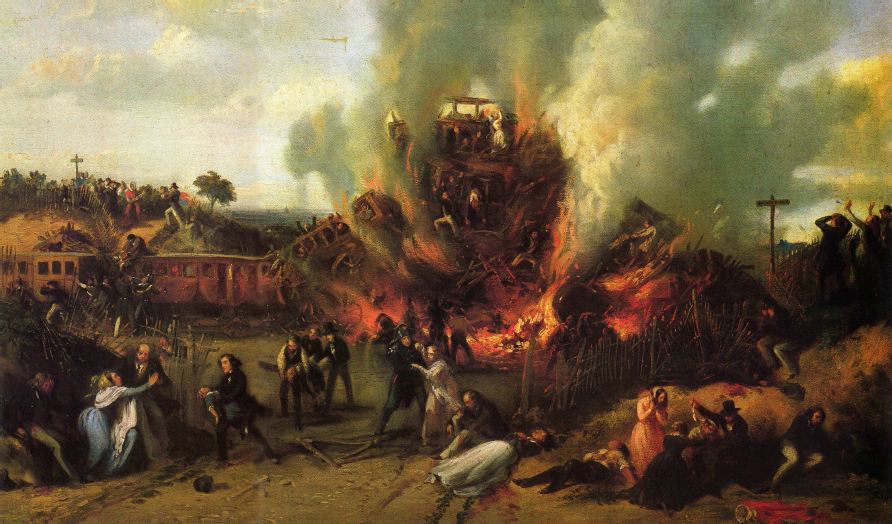
The 1842 Versailles—Bellevue line disaster. News about events like this one contributed to train anxiety

The fear of trains is anxiety and fear associated with trains, railways, and railway travel.

== Psychoanalysis ==
Psychoanalysts, starting from Sigmund Freud, associated sensations towards travel by train with sexuality. In 1906, Freud wrote that the link between railway travel and sexuality derives from the pleasurable sensation of shaking during the travel. Therefore, in the event of repression of sexuality the person will experience anxiety when confronted with railway travel. Karl Abraham interpreted the fear of the uncontrollable motion of a train as a projection of the fear of uncontrolled sexuality. Wilhelm Stekel (1908) also associated train phobia with rocking sensation, but in addition to libido repression, he associated it with the embarrassment with the reminiscences of the rocking sensation of the early childhood.

== Other considerations ==
Freud himself was suffering a kind of train anxiety, as he confessed in a number of letters. He used the term "Reiseangst" for it, which literally means "fear of travel" but it was recognized it was primarily associated with the travel by train, and some translators translated Freud's "Reiseangst" as "railroad phobia" However Freud's anxiety was not classified as a "true" phobia, since once the travel started, the anxiety disappeared, and in fact, Freud traveled much and liked it.

Regardless of sexuality, since early days various authors associated the uncontrollable movement of the train with the fear of derailment, or a catastrophe.

Another source of fear in the early days of railway travel was travelers' isolation from the outside world, as well as the confinement in a small compartment, rendering a person who became sick or subject to crime, helpless. "...The loudest screams are swallowed up by the roar of the rapidly revolving wheels...". This kind of fear, as well as actual crimes committed in trains, were often a matter of newspaper publications of the times. After a number of prominent cases this fear was elevated to the level of collective psychosis. Public fear about rail travel was heightened after British surgeon John Eric Erichsen described a post-traumatic diagnosis known as railway spine or "Erichsen's disease". People diagnosed with this had no obvious injury and were rejected as fake. Nowadays it is known that traffic accidents may cause post-traumatic stress disorder.

== Alternative names and etymology ==
It has been variously called "train phobia", "railroad phobia", "dread of railway travel", etc. The German term "Eisenbahnangst" used, e.g., by Sigmund Freud was literally converted into Greek as "siderodromophobia" (Eisen = sideron = iron, Bahn = dromos = way, Angst = phobos = fear). In cases when this anxiety exceeds the social norms of a realistic fear, this anxiety may be classified as a specific phobia about trains. Campbell's Psychiatric Dictionary puts the fear of trains under the "vehicle phobia", together with fears of boats, airplanes, automobiles, and other forms of transportation.

== See also ==
Other travel-related anxieties include:

- Hodophobia - The phobia of travel
- Fear of air travel
- Fear of sea travel
- Driving phobia

Other transport-related disorders include:

- Transport tetany in animals, also known as "railroad disease" or "railroad sickness"
- Travel sickness in humans; in the late 1800s a "railroad sickness" (de:Eisenbahnkrankheit) was frequently diagnosed
