= Fear of trains (disambiguation) =

The fear of trains is an anxiety disorder, sometimes aggravated to the specific phobia level, associated with trains, railways, and railway travel.

Fear of Trains may also refer to:

- "Fear of Trains", a song from The Charm of the Highway Strip album by The Magnetic Fields
- "Strah od vozova" (literally "fear of trains"), a song from the Jahači magle album by Bajaga i Instruktori, also covered by other singers
