= Driving phobia =

- Specialty: Psychology

Driving phobia, driving anxiety, vehophobia, amaxophobia or driving-related fear (DRF) is a pathological fear of driving. It is an intense, persistent fear of participating in car traffic (or in other vehicular transportation) that affects a person's lifestyle, including aspects such as an inability to participate in certain jobs due to the pathological avoidance of driving. The fear of driving may be triggered by specific driving situations, such as expressway driving or dense traffic. Driving anxiety can range from a mild cautious concern to a phobia.

== Symptoms ==
The fear of driving is associated with various physical and subjective emotional symptoms that somewhat vary from individual to individual. Driving alone can intensify fears due to breakdowns, isolation, or no help, worsening at night. For example, the physical symptoms might involve increased perspiration or tachycardia (pathologically accelerated heart rate), or hyperventilation. On the cognitive level, the patient may experience a loss of sense of reality, or thoughts of losing control while driving, even in situations that are reasonably safe. On a behavioral level, the avoidance of driving tends to perpetuate the phobia. Patients who developed their amaxophobia after a serious traffic collision frequently develop the post-traumatic stress disorder (PTSD) that may involve experiencing intrusive thoughts or anxious dreams of the original collision and/or other typical PTSD symptoms. One part of post-collision symptomatology is the phantom brake syndrome. It is the passenger's partly involuntary or unintended pressing the foot on the floor of the car in a reflexive attempt "to brake." This unintended behavior usually occurs in skilled drivers when they are seated as a passenger next to a less competent person who drives the vehicle as a reflexive response to potentially dangerous traffic situations. The phantom brake syndrome is particularly common in survivors of serious car collisions.

=== Associated conditions ===
Some patients who present with phobia of driving also describe features consistent with various other anxiety disorders, including panic disorder, agoraphobia, specific phobia, and social phobia. The majority of survivors of serious car collisions tend to experience only the phobia of driving, but they often report generalized anxiety as a part of their post-traumatic adjustment disorder. The amaxophobia tends to be perpetuated by persistent pain caused by the car crash, and by pain related insomnia, and also by persistent post-concussion and whiplash symptoms caused by the crash. The PTSD symptoms, e.g., in the forms of flashbacks such as intrusive images of a bleeding person injured in the same car crash, may also contribute to amaxophobia. Correlations of PTSD scores to scores on measures of driving anxiety are significant and range from .31 to .79.

== Causes ==
There are three major categories of driving phobia, distinguished by their onset.

The most common cause of a fear of driving is traffic collisions. Thus, the amaxophobia often develops as a reaction to a particularly traumatic vehicular collision. Beck and Coffey reported that 25–33% of people involved in a car collision associated with injuries and related evaluation in a hospital experience subsequent fear of driving. Hickling and Blanchard and Kuch, Swinson, and Kirby found higher rates of driving phobia, ranging from 42% to 77%. The majority of experienced drivers with fear of driving in the aftermath of their serious collisions rate themselves as safer drivers than average, though they feel physically and emotionally too uncomfortable. For some patients, the fear escalates in very specific situations such as when near large vehicles (transport trucks, buses), but in others, the fear may be triggered already just by getting seated in the car or even just by thinking about having to again travel in a car in the near future. Several psychological questionnaires have been developed for clinicians to assess the situational intensity and facets of driving anxiety in novice drivers or also in experienced drivers traumatized by a recent car collision. Some novice drivers and passengers who were never involved in a serious car collision also report symptoms of amaxophobia. The driving fear may be, in some patients, an extension of agoraphobia.

== Treatment ==
The most common treatment for both driving phobia and milder forms of driving anxiety is behavior therapy in the form of systematic desensitization. An emerging treatment approach to treating amaxophobia is through the use of virtual reality therapy. With repeated exposure such as via devices similar to video games, the subjective distress is gradually reduced: the patient may subsequently be more willing to proceed to engaging in driving in real life situations, as the next stage of exposure therapy.

== Psychological assessment ==
A variety of inventories have been developed to assess driving anxiety.

- The Driving Behavior Survey (DBS) consists of 20 items, each of which is rated on a 1–7 scale; for example, "I have trouble staying in the correct lane".
- The Driving Cognition Questionnaire (DCQ) also consists of 20 items. These are rated on a 0–4 scale. Some items of this questionnaire assess related social anxieties and self-image issues, e.g., "People will think I am a bad driver". Such self-image issues are relatively uncommon in patients with a post-crash amaxophobia some of whom drove without collisions and without emotional discomfort for decades.
- The Driving and Riding Avoidance Scale (DRAS) also consists of 20 items. These are scored from 0 to 4. Its 20 items describe various situations in which driving is avoided. As discussed by Taylor and Sullman, the wording of DRAS items allows for responses that are not necessarily based on fear of driving, but could also involve economic or practical issues. For instance, the travel via subway trains or streetcars within the center of some major North American or European cities is far more rapid than in cars and/or it saves both gasoline and parking fees.

== Epidemiology ==
Little is known about the prevalence of driving anxiety. One study found that 16% of New Zealand adults have "moderate to severe driving anxiety".

== See also ==
- List of phobias
- Hodophobia - The phobia of travel
