= Hodophobia =

Fear of travel

- Other names: Fear of travel
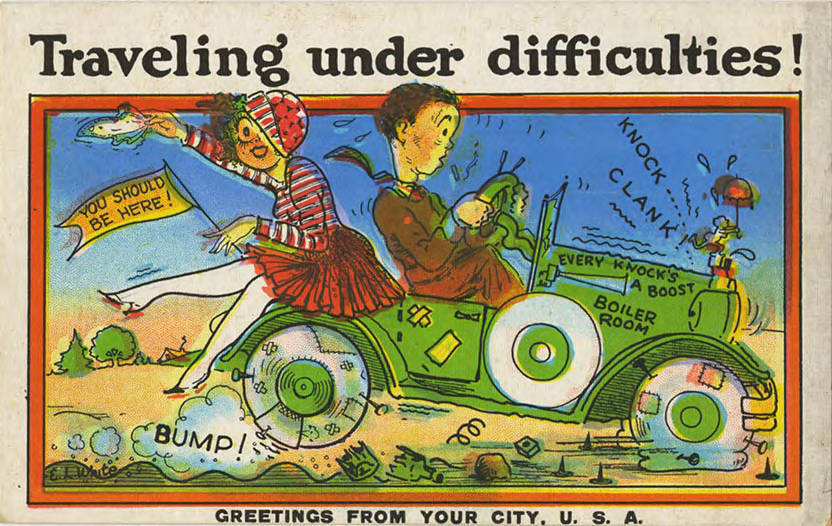
- Pronunciation: /hoʊdəˈfoʊbiə/
- Specialty: Psychiatry, clinical psychology
- Symptoms: intense, persistent anxiety with thoughts of travel and/or during travels
- Duration: > 6 months
- Causes: Genetic and environmental factors
- Differential diagnosis: Separation anxiety, Posttraumatic stress disorder, Major depressive disorder
- Treatment: Exposure therapy, cognitive behavioral therapy

Hodophobia is defined as an intense, persistent, and irrational fear of travel or a specific mode of travel. The term is derived from the Greek words hodós (ὁδός), meaning "road" or "journey," and phóbos (φόβος), meaning "fear." It is distinct from generalized travel anxiety, as the fear is disproportionate to the actual danger involved and leads to significant avoidance or distress.

Hodophobia should not be confused with travel aversion.

Acute anxiety provoked by travel can be treated with anti-anxiety medication. The condition can be treated with exposure therapy, which works better when combined with cognitive behavioral therapy.

== Signs and symptoms ==
People with fear of traveling experience intense, persistent fear or anxiety when they think about traveling and/or during travel. They will avoid travel if they can, and the fear, anxiety, and avoidance cause significant distress and impair their ability to function. As classified under Specific Phobia, Situational Type in the Diagnostic and Statistical Manual of Mental Disorders, Fifth Edition (DSM-5), the fear is typically persistent, lasting for six months or more.

=== Clinical Presentation ===
The phobia manifests through a combination of cognitive, emotional, and physical symptoms.

Cognitive and Emotional:

- Intense, anticipatory anxiety, which can begin days or weeks before a planned trip. The mind often generates catastrophic scenarios related to the journey.
- Overestimation of risk and an overwhelming feeling of a loss of control, particularly in modes of transport where escape may not be possible (e.g., airplanes, trains, buses).
- Compulsive behaviors such as excessive over-planning and research to eliminate uncertainty.

Physical:

- Rapid heart rate and palpitations
- Chest tightness or shortness of breath
- Gastrointestinal distress (nausea, vomiting, diarrhea, stomach aches)
- Sweating, trembling, or dizziness

=== Related phobias ===
- Fear of flying
- Driving phobia
- Fear of trains
- Thalassophobia - phobia of sea travel
- Agoraphobia - fear of leaving safe places

== Cause ==
The cause, or etiology, of hodophobia is intricate and typically stems from a combination of factors, including classical conditioning, genetic predisposition, and environmental influences. A primary cause is traumatic conditioning, where a direct negative experience creates a strong association between the act of travel and danger, subsequently leading to an avoidance response. Alternatively, the phobia can arise through vicarious learning after an individual hears about or witnesses highly publicized negative travel events, like major accidents, disasters, or acts of terrorism, which elevates their perceived health and safety risks. Furthermore, genetic and temperamental factors play a significant predisposing role, as individuals with a family history of anxiety disorders or those exhibiting personality traits like high neuroticism, a profound need for control, or a strong preference for routine are often more susceptible to developing hodophobia.

== Diagnosis ==
The diagnosis is clinical. It is often difficult to determine if the specific phobia of hodophobia should be the primary diagnosis, or if it is a symptom of a generalized anxiety disorder or another anxiety disorder.

=== Classification ===
Hodophobia is a specific phobia as classified in the DSM-5.

== Management ==
Acute anxiety caused by travel can be treated with anti-anxiety medication. The condition can also be treated with exposure therapy which works better when combined with cognitive behavioral therapy. Relaxation techniques and education can also be helpful in combination with other approaches.

== Society and culture ==
Sigmund Freud, the famous neurologist and the founder of psychoanalysis, confessed in a number of letters that he suffered from fear of travel. He used the term "Reiseangst" for it, which means "travel anxiety" or "fear of travel" in the German language. However Freud's anxiety was not a "true" phobia.

== See also ==
- List of phobias
- Specific phobia

Other travel-related disorders include:

- Travel sickness in humans
- Transport tetany in animals
