= Dillon William Hill =

American entrepreneur, philanthropist, and marketing executive

- Born: c. 1998; United States
- Education: University of California, Davis; University of Arizona
- Occupations: Entrepreneur, philanthropist, marketing executive
- Known for: Gamers Gift; One List One Life; Lemons for Leukemia campaign
- Website: www.gamersgift.org

Dillon William Hill (born c. 1998) is an American entrepreneur, philanthropist, and marketing executive. He is the founder of Gamers Gift, a nonprofit organization that provides virtual reality and video game experiences to individuals in hospitals and care facilities.

Hill is also known for co-creating One List One Life, a campaign to support his terminally ill friend Chris Betancourt and raise awareness for bone marrow donation. As part of this initiative, he co-launched the Lemons for Leukemia challenge in 2018, a social media campaign that contributed to a record-setting bone marrow donor registration drive.

== Early life and education ==
Hill earned a bachelor's degree in Information Science from the University of Arizona. He later enrolled in the Master of Business Administration program at the University of California, Davis.

== Career ==
=== Gamers Gift ===
In 2015, while still in high school, Hill co-founded Gamers Gift, a nonprofit focused on using virtual reality and gaming technology to improve the well-being of people with medical or mobility challenges. The organization officially launched in 2016 and began working with hospitals and assisted-living facilities to provide recurring virtual reality sessions. Gamers Gift enabled bedridden or disabled individuals to virtually explore places and activities they otherwise couldn’t, such as scuba diving or touring distant locations. By the end of its first year, it had raised over $50,000 and established programs in the Sacramento, California area.

=== One List One Life bucket list campaign ===
In late 2017, Hill temporarily withdrew from college to support his friend Chris Betancourt, who had received a terminal leukemia diagnosis. Together, they created One List One Life, a campaign centered around completing a bucket list of life experiences. The project aimed to raise awareness about leukemia and promote bone marrow donor registration. It gained attention through a viral video and media coverage, allowing the pair to complete several items on the list while encouraging public participation in donor registries.

Hill and Betancourt’s story gained attention first at the local level and then nationally. A YouTube video introducing One List One Life attracted significant viewership in November 2017, receiving nearly 300,000 views within its first week. The video prompted widespread engagement, with viewers submitting bucket list suggestions and providing various forms of support.

=== Lemons for Leukemia campaign ===
As part of the bucket list campaign, Hill and Betancourt launched Lemons for Leukemia in early 2018. The initiative invited participants to film themselves eating a lemon and nominate others to do the same, with the goal of increasing bone marrow donor sign-ups. The campaign received support from nonprofit organizations and public figures, helping to set a record for the most new donor registrations in a 24-hour period, with over 3,700 people joining the registry.

In May 2018, a matching donor was found for Betancourt, allowing him to undergo a potentially life-saving bone marrow transplant. Following this development, Hill continued the One List One Life initiative to assist other individuals with terminal diagnoses, although later campaigns did not achieve the same level of public engagement.

=== Marketing and later work ===
After completing his undergraduate degree, Hill managed digital advertising accounts at Omnilocal.ai, a conversational AI platform, and worked on early-stage product development at Grazb, a peer networking app. He later established Cosmoforge, a digital marketing and consulting firm, where he serves as an outsourced chief marketing officer for clients. His work includes overseeing paid advertising, search engine optimization (SEO), customer relationship management (CRM), and marketing automation.

He remains active in nonprofit work, and Gamers Gift continues its programming.
