= Railroad sickness =

Railroad sickness may refer to:

- Transport tetany in livestock
- Motion sickness in humans

== See also ==
- de:Eisenbahnkrankheit, an obsolete 19th century diagnosis of "railroad sickness", mostly superseded by that of motion sickness
