= Submechanophobia =

Fear of submerged man-made objects

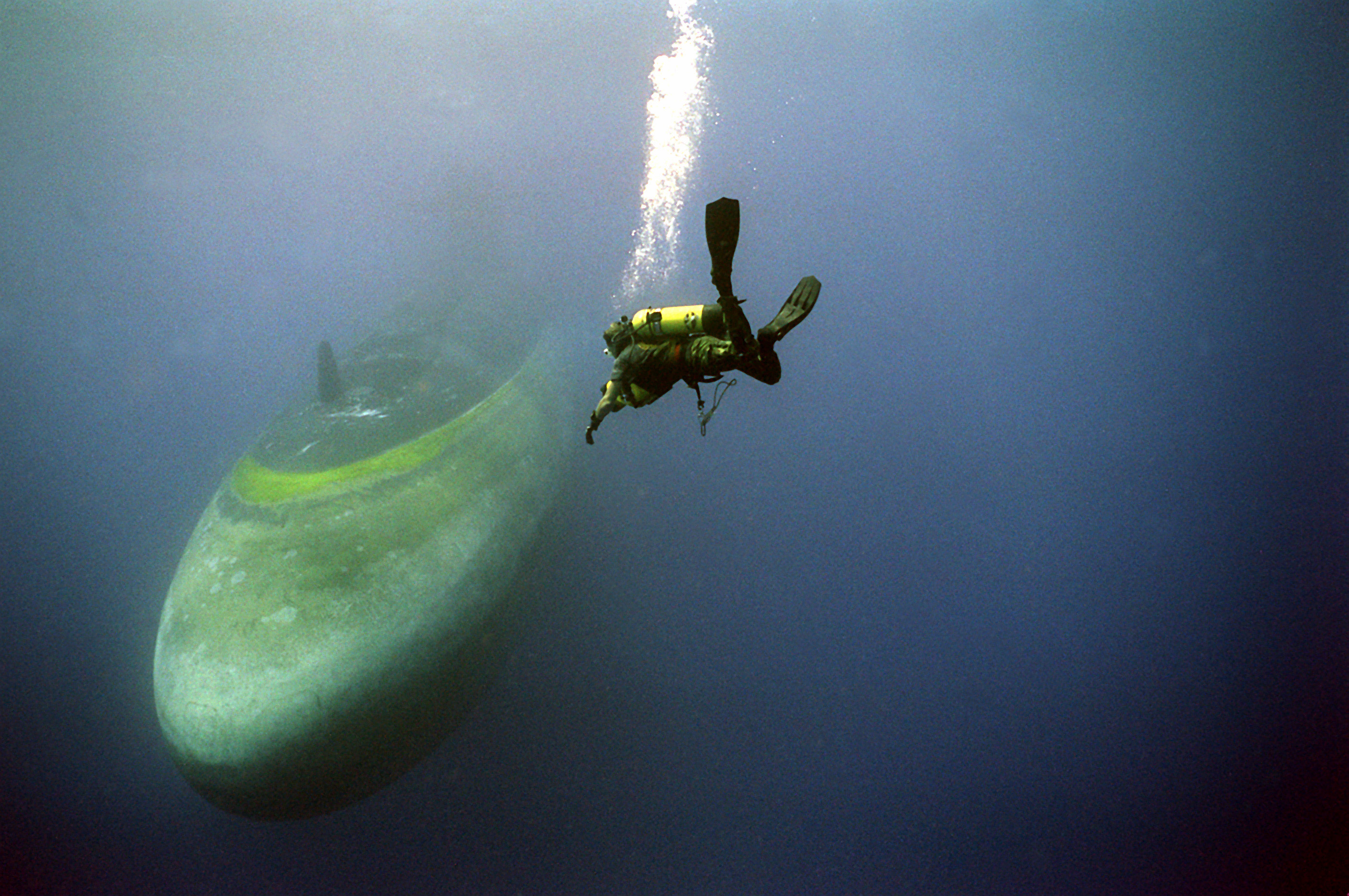
- Specialty: Psychology
- Treatment: Exposure therapy with Cognitive behavioral therapy and Virtual reality therapy

Submechanophobia (from Latin sub 'under'; and from Ancient Greek μηχανή (mechané) 'machine' and φόβος (phóbos) 'fear') is a fear of submerged man-made objects, either partially or entirely underwater. These objects could be shipwrecks, statues, sea mines, animatronics as seen in theme parks, or old buildings, but also more mundane items such as buoys, chains, and miscellaneous debris.

== Causes ==
There are several proposed causes of submechanophobia, though none are proven. Submechanophobia could be caused by a fear of the unknown, and the common terror of not knowing what lies beneath the waterline. Objects could be visually distorted by water and its movement, which could make them seem alive, and thus, possibly harmful. However, submechanophobia, by definition, only concerns artificial, man-made creations—not living creatures. A suggested explanation is that the human mind instinctively detects a foreign object in an otherwise natural environment, and this triggers a fight-or-flight response, as humans respond negatively to that which is outside of the norm. Many submechanophobics do not attribute the development of their phobia to any specific experience or traumatic memory—in fact, most claim that their symptoms arose after a lifetime of contact with their triggers.

== Criteria ==
To qualify for a diagnosis of a specific phobia such as submechanophobia, subjects must display several symptoms and fulfill a list of requirements.

- Unreasonable and excessive fear
- Immediate anxiety response
- Avoidance/extreme distress
- Life-limiting
- 6+ month duration of fear
- Not attributable to another disorder

== Symptoms ==
Many individuals afflicted with submechanophobia exhibit some symptoms in common.

- Severe anxiety associated with the thought of submerged man-made objects
- Muscle tension, body aches
- Breathlessness, sensations of choking
- Increased blood pressure
- Sweating, nausea
- Dizziness, feeling faint
- Inability to concentrate
- Avoidance of locations where contact is likely to be made with triggers

== Treatment ==
Treatment of a fear of artificial submerged objects generally involves identifying and eliminating the underlying fears. A patient can undergo therapy should they believe that their condition is out of control, and interfering with their everyday life. Treatment plans may include cognitive behavioral therapy, virtual reality therapy, exposure therapy, or a combination of these. A sufferer's needs will be unique to themselves, as well as to the nature of their affliction.

== See also ==
- List of phobias
- Thalassophobia – fear of the sea
- Aquaphobia – fear of water
