= Video game rehabilitation =

Process of using video games for therapy

- Other names: Gaming rehabilitation

Video game rehabilitation is a process of using common video game consoles and methodology to target and improve physical and mental weaknesses through therapeutic processes. Video games are becoming an integral part of occupational therapy practice in acute, rehabilitation, and community settings.

The design of video games in rehabilitation is focused on a number of fundamental principles, such as reward, goals, challenge, and meaningful play. 'Meaningful play' emerges from the relationship between player action and system outcome, apparent to the player through, visual, physical and aural feedback. Platforms that feature motion control, notably the Nintendo Wii, Microsoft's Xbox Kinect, Sony's Eye Toy, and virtual reality have all been effective in this field of research. Methodologies have been applied to all age groups, from toddlers to the elderly. It has been used in a variety of cases ranging from stroke rehabilitation, cerebral palsy and other neurological impairments, to tendinitis and multiple sclerosis. Researchers have promoted such technology based on the personalization of gaming systems to patients, allowing for further engagement and interaction. Gaming consoles have the ability to capture real-time data and provide instant feedback to the patients using the systems. Several researchers have performed case studies to demonstrate the benefits of this technology. Repeat trials and experiments have shown that outcomes are easily replicated among various groups worldwide. The outcomes have increased interest in the field, growing experiments beyond simple case studies to experiments with a larger participant base.

== History ==
Since the early 1980s, there has been evidence in the literature of commercially available video games used for therapeutic purpose for different patients. The use of virtual feedback has been seen scattered throughout history for quite some time. However, though the feedback was virtual, the performances were not widely virtual until the 1990s. With the early-stage experimentation, not many positive results were found causing some doubt of the systems. Some even found that too much virtual feedback increased poor performance outside of the controlled environment. As virtual reality systems and virtual environments became more accessible and affordable, though, so too did the implementations of and research on them. The use of these systems in positive motor skill development began somewhere in the late 1990s as more researchers realized the benefit of internal, corrective feedback in such environments. At the same time, researchers across the world began experimenting with the effect of virtual reality in therapeutic measures for anxiety disorder and phobias. With positive results, such as better motor control and lower anxiety in relation to phobias, coming from these experiments, researchers began looking into virtual reality systems as a form of rehabilitation in the early 2000s, and the research has expanded since. Now, common gaming consoles such as the Wii and Kinect allow researchers to use cheaper, more readily available systems in their labs, as well, opening up new possibilities for games and rehabilitation options. Case studies and use of systems in actual therapy offices have suggested that this field has the potential to impact therapy outside the lab setting, as well, making it a rapidly growing field of interest. Currently, several reviews of the findings have also suggested positive effects of this form of rehabilitation, garnering support for this field as well.

Several studies have been conducted regarding the potential of applying virtual reality to different therapies. A systematic literature review published in 2012 analyzed 963 publications regarding virtual reality and rehabilitation from 1996 and 2010. Investigators found an increasing number of research done in the field yearly, from less than 10 articles per year in 1997 to more than 40 in 2010. More than the number of articles analyzed, this literature review found important issues to be addressed in future studies: i) the need to consider a greater number of participants in each study to best represent the target populations; ii) to improve the use of control groups; iii) to enhance the uniformity of the tests applied and iv) to execute more follow-up studies in the field. These aspects would allow the comparison among different studies and the conceptualization of the results from different studies. Lastly, this investigation cites the importance of research in the field of virtual reality and rehabilitation, once the potential of this technology is recognized to support the neural and cognitive rehabilitation of different patients.

== Rehabilitation through gaming vs. regular methods ==
Throughout its development, gaming in rehabilitation has gained a large amount of support for its differences in comparison to regular therapeutic methods. The biggest of these differences is the user engagement and enjoyment. It has been extensively shown that people feel more engaged in a gaming environment and less contained in a doctors office when interacting in a virtual reality, gaming environment. Those who are able to participate in gaming rehabilitation have also been shown to use less energy than those participating in normal therapeutic methods. While this may not be positive for all patients, this is beneficial for those patients who may be elderly or have minimal energy to expend in therapy-type settings. Saving energy while still participating in therapy has proven effective for these groups of people, since they are still able to progress in their goals towards rehabilitation, but not over-work themselves in the process. On the other hand, normal physical rehabilitation routine requires commitment to lengthy periods of difficult exercise, which causes the patient to drop out of the therapy routines. Rehabilitation through gaming provides the opportunity to address two important areas: accessibility of rehabilitation and patient motivation.

The ability for gaming consoles to exist anywhere and be purchased by anyone also allows this sort of therapy to be quite personalized to the patient. Patients who use gaming rehabilitation have been shown to be more engaged in the therapy efforts and more likely to continue their therapy outside of the doctor's office than those engaging in regular therapeutic efforts. Being able to bring their therapy into the comfort of their own home and at a relatively low cost contributes to these outcomes. As a result of their increased adherence to therapy and motivation to engage in therapy, patients who engage in gaming rehabilitation have also shown improved outcomes of their efforts.

Another benefit to using games for rehabilitation purposes is that they have the ability to be customized to real-life scenarios more so than typical therapy methods do. When asked about their therapy, patients have reported that they don't see the relation to their every-day life when performing the activities. Instead, they see it as an activity they do simply in their doctor's office, away from their regular life. Virtual reality-based rehabilitation has the ability to be designed to introduce real-life challenges and every-day hurdles that can be seen in the real world. They're tailored to the needs of the individuals and to the environment that they are expected to encounter on a regular basis. This consideration contributes to the "ecological validity" of the rehabilitation method. With gaming through rehabilitation, medical doctors have witnessed cancer patients who utilize video games during procedures have a lower pain tolerance when using an active distraction vs, a passive distraction.

Typical rehabilitation methods have also been seen to present difficulties to those participating in them. At times these difficulties keep anywhere from 30%–66% of people from reaching their goals for their therapy. When the goals are not achieved people are generally made to participate in longer therapy sessions, more therapy sessions, or more in-depth and difficult sessions than before, such as constraint-induced movement therapy. In each of these cases, patients are generally forced to pay more than before and are also put through more work than they initially planned. It has been found through research, however, that virtual reality situations can likely increase a person's desire to participate in therapy and therefore increase their chances of reaching their therapy goals, unlike those left underachieved with regular methods.

== Physical rehabilitation ==
The University of Essex conducted a study to evaluate the efficacy of including the Wii in an established falls prevention training program to improve balance, mobility, and educate recovery from the instance of a fall. After a 7-week falls prevention training, the results indicated that Wii can positively support a standard rehabilitation, although the use of the game alone would not be encouraged. On the other hand, participants found the experience of Wii game as enjoyable, which can support patients engagement to training. A follow-up longitudinal study would be needed to conclude if the incidence of falls can be reduced along time. Extending this study, another research conducted by the same University of Essex found that training with Wii can improve mood and self-esteem. This behavior was observed in women who participated in this last mentioned research for fall prevention. As said by investigators, it would not be appropriate to generalize, however one participant who had the biggest improvement on the functional measures had the largest positive changes in well-being, which may indicate that the use of the Wii as an adjunct to standard falls prevention training can improve not only functional but also psychological outcomes. There are many advances in the physical rehabilitation community, advances such as technology has created a more effective and easier way for patients to approach their rehabilitation journey.

== Neurological rehabilitation ==
Several games have been created to support stroke rehabilitation and to alleviate boredom and frustration patients can face with frequent visits to the therapeutic centers.

The gaming therapy can be prescribed by physicians, physical or speech therapists to support the recovery of the damaged muscles and the brain to re-learn to control the damaged movements.

Circus Challenge, created by Newcastle University scientists, is a Wii game developed specifically to support hands and arms' muscles recovery. The Wii Balance Board was another device that helped with the improvement of balance, gait and activities of daily living, which may benefit not only those that suffer from a stroke but other neurological disorders such as Parkinson's disease. The difficulty of the game is increased as the patient recovers, and their progress can be tracked by therapists.

To support the recovery of upper extremity muscles, ARMStrokes was introduced as a mobile app to help stroke survivors to complete their rehabilitation exercises. The game is a real-time application that provides a communication platform to facilitate interaction of patients with their therapists or physicians. Research to evaluate if this technology can positively impact the stroke recovery process is currently underway.

Cerebral palsy has also been target of using games to support both children and adults affected by this disorder. Research has indicated that children with cerebral palsy can benefit from Wii games such as jogging, bicycling, snowboarding, and skiing to increase their physical activity levels. This physical activity can be challenging and limited for these children, due to accessibility problems that financial and societal barriers impose, such as a lack of equipment or availability of exercise instructors, and even transportation issues. While there is great interest in using video game rehabilitation with children with cerebral palsy, it is difficult to compare outcomes between studies, and therefore to reach evidence-based conclusions on its effectiveness. Because video gaming is popular, it may help children's motivation to continue with the therapy. There is moderate evidence for improvements with balance and motor skills in children and teens, but it is not recommended as an effective therapy. One invention aimed towards Cerebral Palsy patients is THE ORBIT Gaming System which improves Cerebral Palsy patients with hand impairments. The orbit Gaming System contains the results of utilizing both hands to physically trains the patients strength in their hands while creating a fun environment for recovery.

== Mobile phone applications ==
Expanding outside of virtual reality and gaming systems, a newer segment of video game rehabilitation focuses on games that can be played on mobile phones or tablet computers - mobile apps. While these are not necessarily the standard video gaming console, these are being seen more frequently as alternatives with the introduction of more and more smart phones in the market. As such, researchers have recently begun to experiment with how mobile phone applications can also contribute to rehabilitation measures. While still relatively new, this concept has shown to be effective in wrist and hand rehabilitation on multiple different occasions. Wrist rehabilitation through a droid-based game, for example, revealed that patients can have more flexibility in their therapy sessions by keeping track of their progress on their phone and taking exercises home with them. It was also found that they could create a more customized therapy session through use of a patient's mobile device. Increasing finger use after a stroke is another area this methodology has proven effective for. In this case, the common mobile app, Fruit Ninja, was used to track patient use of their fingers and control of their hand when making fine movements such as cutting a fruit in the game. Positive results suggested that a patient's interaction with the game could determine and complement other therapy methods being used. Evidence in studies show that these types of game systems (apps and haptic devices are effective in the rehabilitation process.

== Results ==
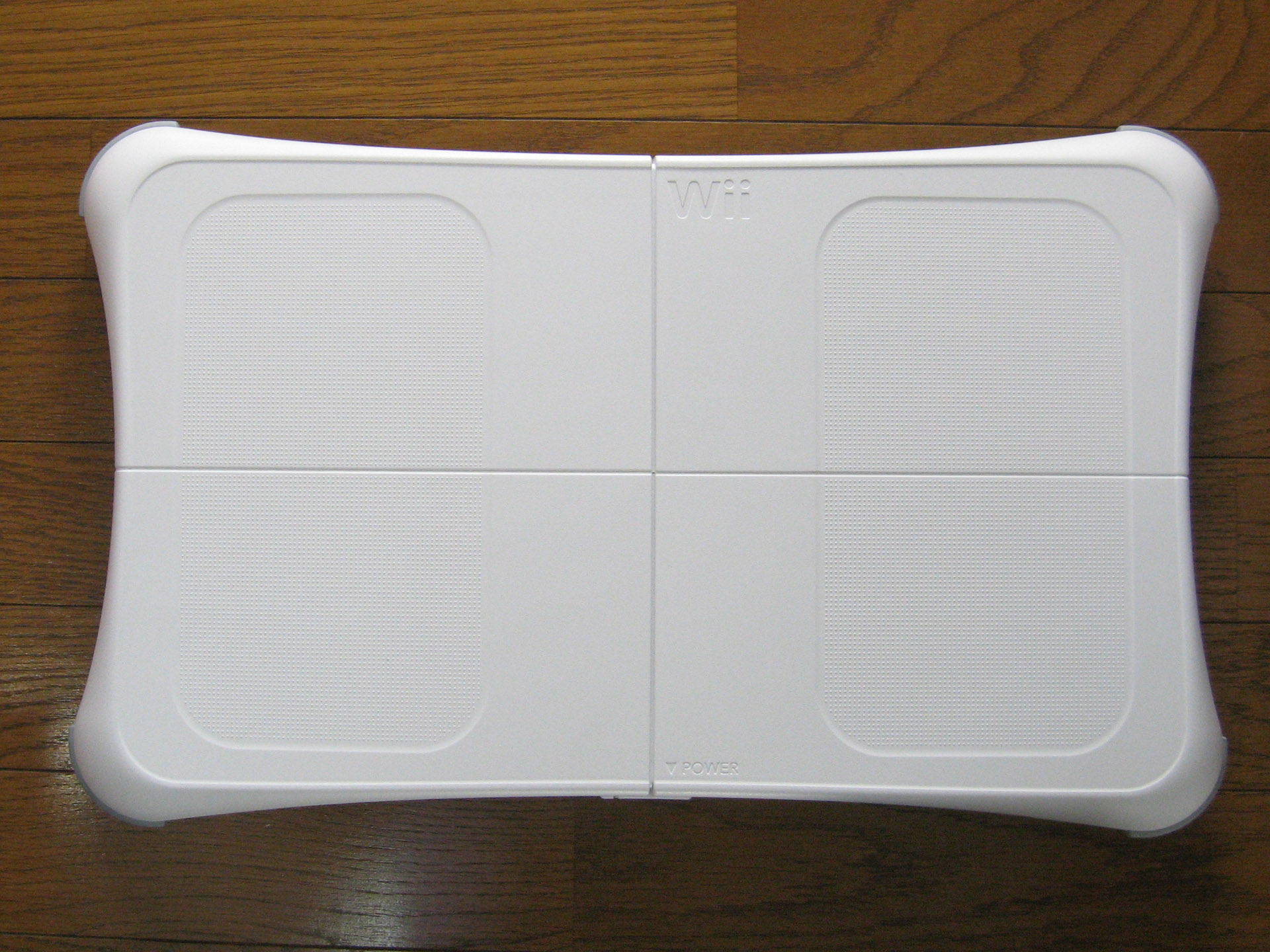
The Wii Balance Board, which is bundled with Wii Fit, measures a person's weight and center of balance.

Timed Up and Go test (TUG) scores have been seen to improve after having engaged in gaming rehabilitation. Several studies have produced output that suggests that Wii games are able to effectively increase patients' scores after a certain period of rehabilitation through them. Stroke recovery patients and patients with an Acquired brain injury are two such examples of this output. Both patient classes have been shown to display slightly better improvements when using the Wii game or Wii balance board than when engaging in regular therapeutic methodologies. Continuing past these classes, studies are continually proving that these scores can be increased in a variety of patients with a variety of physical disabilities and from a variety of backgrounds.

In recent studies, professionals have proven that the therapist and patient create a positive relationship during physical rehabilitation with video games. A meta-analysis by Taylor et al. (2018), published in the Journal of Geriatric Physical Therapy, explored how active video games (AVG) can impact the mobility and balance in older patients. The outcomes indicate that that AVGs showed significant improvements in balance and lower limb strength, supported by an increased Berg Balance Scale (BBS) and 30-second Sit to Stand (STS) scores. Also, the patients exhibited better gait speed and Timed Up and Go (TUG) scores which implies a reduced fall risk, which is an important aspect in geriatric rehabilitation. The results suggest that incorporating AVGs in clinical settings as a viable intervention for enriching functional mobility and stability especially in older populations.

Balance and energy expenditure are other great improvements seen amongst patients of gaming rehabilitation methods. Methods such as using the Wii Fit board and Wii Sports games have proven effective at increasing these numbers amongst a variety of patients. Elderly and cerebral palsy patients have been the focus of these outputs, as both have the ability to improve these categories of their lives. Specifically, elderly have been shown to display poor balance and mobility due to aging conditions, resulting in a need for rehabilitation intervention and cerebral palsy patients display a combination of poor posture and poor balance which result in a need for therapy, as well. Both, after a period of engaging in a variety of Wii-based games, have shown improvement comparable to, or better than, what they display during regular methodologies, gaining support for these systems. Specifically, for the elderly community, interactive video-game based system exercise on the balance can improve balance after 6 weeks of implementation Elderly patients with Parkinson's disease showed improved performance in activities of daily living after 14 sessions of balance training, with no additional advantages associated with the Wii-based motor and cognitive training.

Finally, motor-skill rehabilitation has been proposed as another possible way in which games can be used for rehabilitation purposes. Stroke patients with upper extremity motor difficulties have been the primary focus of this subject and, in this case, a variety of gaming environments have been experimented with. Output has shown that their Fugl-Meyer UE scores and their Functional Independence Measure scale score increase after a period of engaging in virtual rehabilitation, suggesting that their mobility dysfunction decreased and their degree of independence increased due to the intervention. Output has suggested improved motor skills on a higher level, having several researchers suggesting positive improvements in their stroke patients as a result of virtual rehabilitation methods. At this higher level, researchers have suggested improved ability to walk, or ambulation, and improved use of larger motor skills after intervention. One other class of patients that has been studied less frequently in this category of rehabilitation is cerebral palsy patients. Ability to walk certain distances without the use of an assistive device was the method of measurement for this category. After a period of working with a Wii-based system, it was shown that a patient who struggled with walking large distances before, was able to walk a noticeably longer distance. This suggests an improvement in larger motor skills, whereas the stroke patients demonstrated an improvement in finer motor skills, focused strictly on their use of upper extremities during the gaming rehabilitation.

=== Negative results ===
If by one hand rehabilitation through gaming may be beneficial since it can improve motivation to the rehabilitation and reduce distraction from the routine of a tedious medical treatment, injuries arisen from excessive gameplay have been occasionally reported, such as tendonitis, dislocation of patella or hand laceration. A recent study proves that when incorporating video games into a patient's therapy routine can increase their chance of developing musculoskeletal. Although these injuries might be occasional or rare, a large scale study would be needed to investigate the occurrence of these damages facing the millions of users of games worldwide.

It has also been suggested that the use of gaming systems for home-based rehabilitation may promote a lack of communication between the therapist and the patient. In these cases, it is difficult to track the progress of the patient appropriately, and the effects of the therapy are unknown. It's also possible in these scenarios that a lack of tracking also increases time spent on task, since the therapist does not properly see what level the patient is performing at. Another challenge in video game rehabilitation, can result to lack of computer skills on the part of therapists, lack of support infrastructure, expensive equipment, inadequate communication infrastructure, and patient safety concerns.

Common effects of virtual reality environments, such as dizziness, nausea, and disorientation, have also been found to result in the case of rehabilitation through these methodologies. As these scenarios work the same as other virtual reality scenarios, they are not exempt from the negative results that can be seen across the board from these sorts of systems, and patients have shown this to be evident. Virtual reality systems have also proven difficult to maintain and sanitize after use, which has caused some to stray away from their use and stick to regular methodologies instead.

Gaming technology is believed to promote physical activity on clinical populations with multiple sclerosis, although there is no consensus about training duration, intensity or outcomes used to assess the clinical effectiveness, which suggests that randomized controlled trial should be carried out comparing gaming technology to traditional exercise for this population. Similarly, the same can be said with results in the field of video game rehabilitation with elderly patients. While there are consensus's being built, there are still some results that seem insignificant in their findings and remain inconclusive either way. There is not much data available about adverse results such as falls when using video games as part of rehabilitation.

== Theories ==
Some researchers believe that within the next 100 years, video games could find wide use in occupational therapy as rehabilitation tools as technology develops and further research is conducted.

== See also ==
- Exergaming
- mHealth
- Serious game
- Virtual rehabilitation
- Virtual reality therapy
