= Aquaphobia =

Persistent and abnormal fear of water

- Specialty: Psychology
- Symptoms: Aversion to water

Aquaphobia (from Latin aqua 'water' and Ancient Greek φόβος (phóbos) 'fear') is an irrational fear of water. Someone with aquaphobia may have an anxious reaction to water in everyday encounters such as drinking water, washing dishes, or showering, or it may be related to bodies of water like ponds and swimming pools and a more natural, instinctive fear of drowning in them.

Aquaphobia is considered a specific phobia of natural environment type in the Diagnostic and Statistical Manual of Mental Disorders. A specific phobia is an intense fear of something that poses little or no actual danger.

== Etymology ==
The correct Greek-derived term for "water-fear" is hydrophobia, from ὕδωρ (hudōr), "water" and φόβος (phobos), "fear". However, this word has long been used in many languages, including English, to refer specifically to a symptom of later-stage rabies, which manifests itself in humans as difficulty in swallowing, fear when presented with liquids to drink, and an inability to quench one's thirst. Therefore, fear or aversion to water in general is referred to as aquaphobia.

== Prevalence ==
A study of epidemiological data from 22 low, lower-middle, upper-middle and high-income countries revealed "fear of still water or weather events" had a prevalence of 2.3%, across all countries; in the US the prevalence was 4.3%. In an article on anxiety disorders, Lindal and Stefansson suggest that aquaphobia may affect as many as 1.8% of the general Icelandic population, or almost one in fifty people. In America, 46% of American adults are afraid of deep water in pools and 64% are afraid of deep open waters.

== Manifestation for aquaphobia ==
Specific phobias are a type of anxiety disorder in which a person may feel extremely anxious or have a panic attack when exposed to the object of fear. Specific phobias are a common mental disorder.

Psychologists indicate that aquaphobia manifests itself in people through a combination of experiential and genetic factors. Five common causes of aquaphobia are:

- Instinctive fear of drowning
- Past experience of an incident of personal horror
- Overprotective parent, or parent with aquaphobia
- Psychological difficulty adjusting to water
- Lack of trust in water

In the case of a 37-year-old media professor, he noted that his fear initially presented itself as a "severe pain, accompanied by a tightness of his forehead", and a choking sensation, discrete panic attacks and a reduction in his intake of fluids.

== Signs and symptoms ==
Physical responses include nausea, dizziness, numbness, shortness of breath, increased heart rate, sweating, and shivering.

In addition to the signs and symptoms above, some general signs and symptoms one may display in reaction to a specific phobia are:

- Physical symptoms: trembling, hot flushes or chills, pain or tightness in chest, uncomfortable stomach, feeling faint, dry mouth, ringing in ears, and confusion
- Psychological symptoms: feeling fear of losing control, fainting, dread and dying

== Treatment and case studies ==
Treatment options include:

- Hypnosis and systematic desensitization. 28-year-old female, aquaphobic from childhood, hypnosis and systematic desensitization in an 8-week 5-session program, 2-month and 1-year follow-up. 37-year-old male, 10 years of extreme aquaphobia (could not even drink water), 6 sessions of hypnotherapy, therapy was successful, no relapse and 6-month follow-up.
- Cognitive behavioral therapy
- Exposure therapy
- Medication

== See also ==
- List of phobias
- Thalassophobia – fear of the sea
- Submechanophobia – fear of submerged man-made objects
