= Larry F. Hodges =

American computer scientist

Larry Franklin Hodges (born 1958), is an American computer scientist and theologian, best known for his work in computer graphics and virtual reality therapy.

== Education and personal life ==
Larry Franklin Hodges was born in 1958 in North Carolina. Hodges attended North Stanly High School, where he played the trumpet, and graduated with the class of 1976. Initially, Hodges was interested in becoming a musician, but he later found a passion for computer science. After graduating, Hodges enrolled in Elon University, and subsequently earned his Bachelor of Arts in Physics and Mathematics. After earning his Bachelor's, Hodges enrolled in Lancaster Theological Seminary, earning his Master of Arts in Religious Studies. Hodges then enrolled in North Carolina State University and earned his Master's Degree in Computer Science in 1982, then his doctorate in 1988.

== Career ==
In 1993, Hodges organized team a of clinicians and computer scientists to investigate the effectiveness of virtual reality as a treatment for various phobias. In 1995, this team published the seminal paper Effectiveness of computer-generated (virtual reality) graded exposure in the treatment of acrophobia in the American Journal of Psychiatry. The paper was the first published report of a controlled study on the use of virtual reality (VR) for psychotherapy in the psychiatric literature and received widespread media attention, including an announcement of the paper’s results on CBS Evening News the day the journal article was released and follow-up stories in a number of venues, including Scientific American Frontiers, CNN, Dateline NBC, Good Morning America, US News & World Report, MIT Technology Review, Discover, and the New York Times. Following that paper, Hodges continued to publish papers regarding VR therapy.

In 1996, Hodges founded Virtually Better, Inc., with his research colleague Barbara Rothbaum of Emory University. Virtually Better is a company that creates virtual reality software designed to treat patients with mental issues such as phobias or traumas.

Later, in 2006, Hodges was awarded the IEEE Virtual Reality Career Award for his contributions to the field. In 2007, Hodges was also awarded the Georgia Tech GVU Impact Award for his contributions. Since 2021, Hodges has worked at the North Carolina School of Science and Mathematics as an instructor of Computer Science, a department he chaired until January 2025.
