= Agoraphobia =

Anxiety disorder

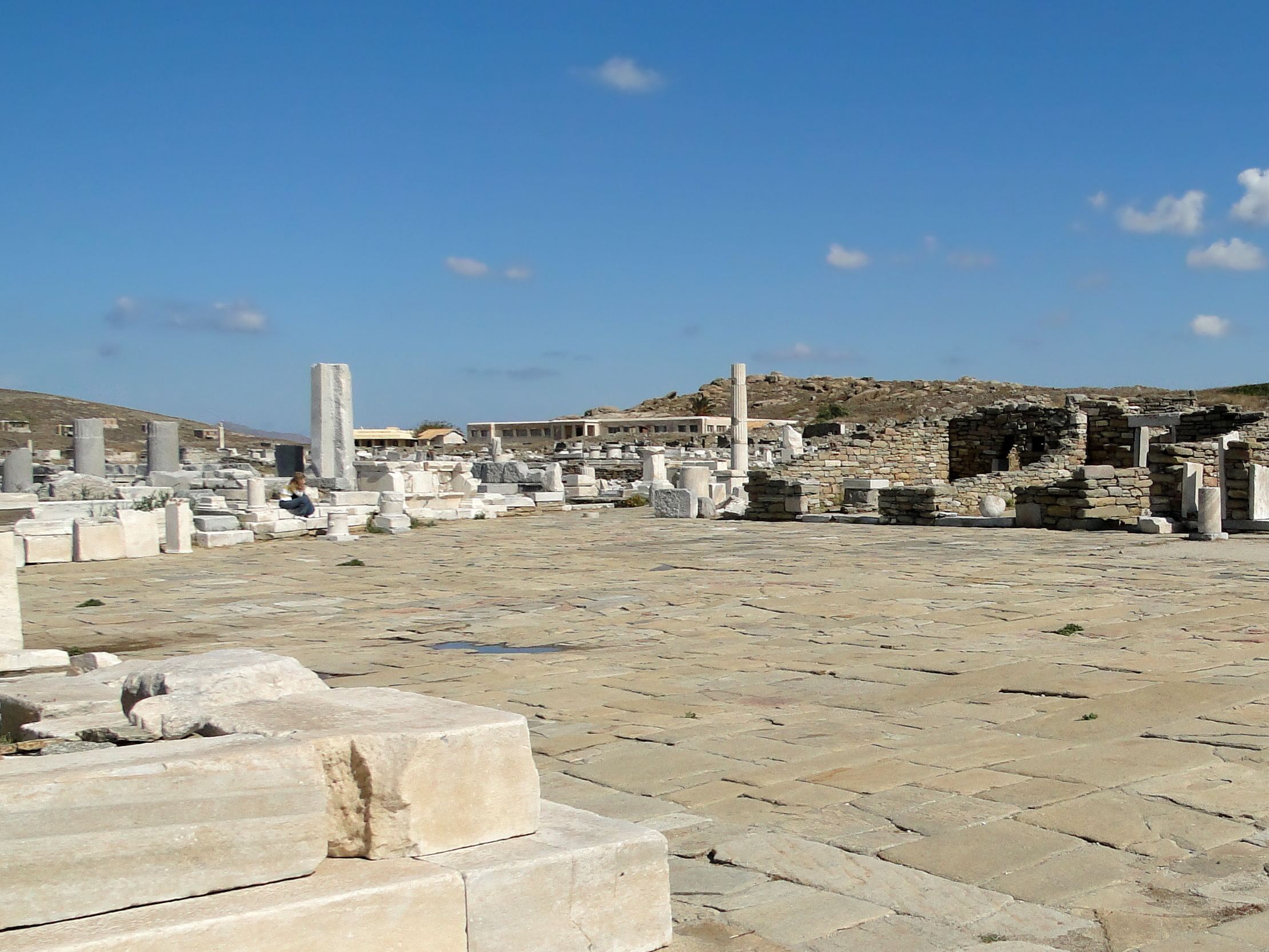
- An ancient agora in Delos, Greece—one of the public spaces after which the condition is named
- Pronunciation: /ˌæɡərəˈfoʊbiəˌ əˌɡɔːrə-/
- Specialty: Psychiatry, clinical psychology
- Symptoms: Anxiety in situations perceived to be unsafe, panic attacks
- Complications: Depression, substance use disorder
- Duration: > 6 months
- Causes: Genetic and environmental factors
- Risk factors: Family history, stressful event
- Differential diagnosis: Separation anxiety, post-traumatic stress disorder, major depressive disorder
- Treatment: Cognitive behavioral therapy
- Prognosis: Resolution in half with treatment
- Frequency: 1.9% of adults

Agoraphobia is an anxiety disorder characterized by symptoms of anxiety in situations where people perceive their environment to be unsafe with no way to escape. These situations can include public transit, shopping centers, crowds and queues, or simply being outside their home on their own. Being in these situations may result in a panic attack. Those affected will go to great lengths to avoid these situations. In severe cases, people may become completely unable to leave their homes.

Agoraphobia is believed to be due to a combination of genetic and environmental factors. The condition often runs in families, and stressful or traumatic events such as the death of a parent or being attacked may be a trigger. In the DSM-5, agoraphobia is classified as a phobia along with specific phobias and social phobia. Other conditions that can produce similar symptoms include separation anxiety, post-traumatic stress disorder, and major depressive disorder. The diagnosis of agoraphobia has been shown to be comorbid with depression, substance abuse, and suicidal ideation.

Without treatment, it is uncommon for agoraphobia to resolve. Treatment is typically with a type of counselling called cognitive behavioral therapy (CBT). CBT results in resolution for about half of people. In some instances, those with a diagnosis of agoraphobia have reported taking benzodiazepines and antipsychotics. Agoraphobia affects about 1.7% of adults. Women are affected about twice as often as men. The condition is rare in children, often begins in adolescence or early adulthood, and becomes more common at age 65 or above.

== Etymology ==
The term agoraphobia was coined in German in 1871 by pioneering German psychologist Karl Friedrich Otto Westphal (1833–1890) in his article "Die Agoraphobie, eine neuropathische Erscheinung" ('Agoraphobia: A Neuropathological Phenomenon') in the journal Archiv für Psychiatrie und Nervenkrankheiten, Berlin, 1871–72; 3: 138–161. It is derived from Greek ἀγορά (agorā́), meaning 'place of assembly' or 'market-place' and -φοβία (-phobía), meaning 'fear'.

== Signs and symptoms ==
Agoraphobia is a condition where individuals become anxious in unfamiliar environments or where they perceive that they have little control. Triggers for this anxiety may include wide-open spaces, crowds (social anxiety), or traveling (even short distances). Agoraphobia is often, but not always, compounded by a fear of social embarrassment, as a person experiencing agoraphobia fears the onset of a panic attack and appearing distraught in public. Most of the time they avoid these areas and stay in the comfort of a known, controllable space, usually their home.

Agoraphobia is also defined as "a fear, sometimes terrifying, by those who have experienced one or more panic attacks". In these cases, the patients are fearful of a particular place because they have previously experienced a panic attack at the same location. Fearing the onset of another panic attack, the patient is fearful or avoids a location. Some refuse to leave their homes in medical emergencies because the fear of being outside of their comfort areas is too great.

The person with this condition can sometimes go to great lengths to avoid the locations where they have experienced the onset of a panic attack. Agoraphobia, as described in this manner, is a symptom professionals check when making a diagnosis of panic disorder. Other syndromes like obsessive–compulsive disorder or post-traumatic stress disorder can also cause agoraphobia. Any irrational fear that keeps one from going outside can cause the syndrome.

People with agoraphobia may experience temporary separation anxiety disorder when certain individuals of the household depart from the residence temporarily, such as a parent or spouse, or when they are left home alone. These situations can result in an increase in anxiety or a panic attack or feeling the need to separate themselves from family or friends.

People with agoraphobia sometimes fear waiting outside for long periods of time; that symptom can be called "macrophobia".

=== Panic attacks ===
Agoraphobia patients can experience sudden panic attacks when traveling to places where they fear they are out of control, help would be difficult to obtain, or they could be embarrassed. During a panic attack, epinephrine is released in large amounts, triggering the body's natural fight-or-flight response. A panic attack typically has an abrupt onset, building to maximum intensity within 10 to 15 minutes, and rarely lasts longer than 30 minutes. Symptoms of a panic attack include palpitations, rapid heartbeat, sweating, trembling, nausea, vomiting, dizziness, tightness in the throat, and shortness of breath. Many patients report a fear of dying, fear of losing control of emotions, or fear of losing control of behaviors.

== Causes ==
Agoraphobia is believed to be due to a combination of genetics and environmental factors. The condition often runs in families, and stressful or traumatic events such as the death of a parent or being attacked may be a trigger.

Research has uncovered a link between agoraphobia and difficulties with spatial orientation. Individuals without agoraphobia are able to maintain balance by combining information from their vestibular system, their visual system, and their proprioceptive sense. A disproportionate number of agoraphobes have weak vestibular function and consequently rely more on visual or tactile signals. They may become disoriented when visual cues are sparse (as in wide-open spaces) or overwhelming (as in crowds). Likewise, they may be confused by sloping or irregular surfaces.

In a virtual reality study, agoraphobes showed more difficulty integrating sensory changes than non-agoraphobics and are "more sensitive to sensory conflicts" than the general population.

=== Substance-induced ===
Chronic use of tranquilizers and sleeping pills such as benzodiazepines has been linked to the onset of agoraphobia. In ten patients who had developed agoraphobia during benzodiazepine dependence, symptoms abated within the first year of assisted withdrawal. Similarly, alcohol use disorders are associated with panic with or without agoraphobia; this association may be due to the long-term effects of alcohol consumption distorting brain chemistry.

Tobacco smoking has also been associated with the development and emergence of agoraphobia, often with panic disorder; it is uncertain how tobacco smoking results in anxiety-panic with or without agoraphobia symptoms, but the direct effects of nicotine dependence or the effects of tobacco smoke on breathing have been suggested as possible causes. Self-medication or a combination of factors may also explain the association between tobacco smoking and agoraphobia and panic.

=== Attachment theory ===
Some scholars have explained agoraphobia as an attachment deficit, i.e., the temporary loss of the ability to tolerate spatial separations from a secure base. Recent empirical research has also linked attachment and spatial theories of agoraphobia.

=== Spatial theory ===
In the social sciences, a perceived clinical bias exists in agoraphobia research. Branches of the social sciences, especially geography, have increasingly become interested in what may be thought of as a spatial phenomenon. One such approach links the development of agoraphobia with modernity. Factors considered contributing to agoraphobia within modernity are the ubiquity of cars and urbanization. These have helped develop the expansion of public space and the contraction of private space, thus creating a conflict in the minds of agoraphobic individuals.

=== Evolutionary perspectives ===
Some evolutionary models propose that agoraphobia—like other specific phobias—may be rooted in adaptive mechanisms that helped early humans avoid threats in open or unfamiliar environments. From this viewpoint, fear and avoidance behaviors could have been selectively favored if they aided survival—for instance, by prompting individuals to steer clear of potentially dangerous surroundings or minimize exposure to predators and pathogens. According to preparedness models, human defensive systems are especially sensitive to cues linked to ancestral threats and can rapidly form strong, lasting fear associations with them. In modern life, such defenses might become mismatched to relatively low-risk environments, producing disproportionate anxiety responses.

An additional evolutionary psychology view is that the more unusual primary agoraphobia without panic attacks may be due to a different mechanism from agoraphobia with panic attacks. Primary agoraphobia without panic attacks may be a specific phobia explained by it once having been evolutionarily advantageous to avoid exposed, large, open spaces without cover or concealment. Agoraphobia with panic attacks may be an avoidance response secondary to the panic attacks, due to fear of the situations in which the panic attacks occurred.

== Diagnosis ==
Most people who present to mental health specialists develop agoraphobia after the onset of panic disorder. Agoraphobia is best understood as an adverse behavioral outcome of repeated panic attacks and subsequent anxiety and preoccupation with these attacks that leads to an avoidance of situations where a panic attack could occur. Early treatment of panic disorder can often prevent agoraphobia. Agoraphobia is typically determined when symptoms are worse than panic disorder, but also do not meet the criteria for other mental disorders such as depression.

=== Agoraphobia without history of panic disorder ===
Agoraphobia without a history of panic disorder (also called primary agoraphobia) is an anxiety disorder where the individual with the diagnosis does not meet the DSM-5 criteria for panic disorder. Agoraphobia typically develops as a result of having panic disorder. In a small minority of cases, however, agoraphobia can develop by itself without being triggered by the onset of panic attacks. Agoraphobia can be caused by traumatic experiences, such as bullying or abuse. Historically, there has been debate over whether agoraphobia without panic genuinely existed, or whether it was simply a manifestation of other disorders such as panic disorder, generalized anxiety disorder, avoidant personality disorder and social phobia. One researcher said: "out of 41 agoraphobics seen (at a clinic) during a period of 1 year, only 1 fit the diagnosis of agoraphobia without panic attacks, and even this particular classification was questionable...Do not expect to see too many agoraphobics without panic". In spite of this earlier skepticism, agoraphobia is defined in the DSM-5 as a diagnostic entity independent of panic disorder, and in the World Mental Health Surveys most respondents with DSM-IV agoraphobia had no history of panic disorder. Such cases are not typically seen in clinical studies, which may partly reflect that people with agoraphobia are less likely to seek help.

According to the DSM-IV-TR, a widely used manual for diagnosing mental disorders, the condition is diagnosed when agoraphobia is present without panic disorder where symptoms are not caused by or are unreasonable to an underlying medical problem or pharmacological influence. The DSM-5 decoupled agoraphobia and panic disorder, making them separate disorders that can be diagnosed together.

== Treatment ==
=== Therapy ===
Systematic desensitization can provide lasting relief to the majority of patients with panic disorder and agoraphobia. The disappearance of residual and sub-clinical agoraphobic avoidance, and not simply of panic attacks, should be the aim of exposure therapy. Many patients can deal with exposure more easily if they are in the company of a friend on whom they can rely. In this approach, it is suggested that people being treated remain in the situation that provokes anxiety until the symptoms anxiety have subsided because if they leave the situation, the phobic response will not decrease and it may even rise.

A related exposure treatment is in vivo exposure, a cognitive behavioral therapy method, that gradually exposes patients to the feared situations or objects. This treatment was largely effective with an effect size from d = 0.78 to d = 1.34, and these effects were shown to increase over time, proving that the treatment had long-term efficacy (up to 12 months after treatment).

Psychological interventions in combination with pharmaceutical treatments were overall more effective than treatments simply involving either CBT or pharmaceuticals. Further research showed there was no significant effect between using group CBT versus individual CBT.

Cognitive restructuring has also proved useful in treating agoraphobia. This treatment involves coaching a participant through a dianoetic discussion, with the intent of replacing irrational, counterproductive beliefs with more factual and beneficial ones.

Relaxation techniques are often useful skills for the agoraphobic to develop, as they can be used to stop or prevent symptoms of anxiety and panic.

Videoconferencing psychotherapy (VCP) is an emerging modality used to treat various disorders in a remote method. Similar to traditional face-to-face interventions, VCP can be used to administer CBT.

Virtual reality computer stimulated therapy has been suggested to help people with psychosis and agoraphobia manage their avoidance of outside environments. In the therapy, the user wears a headset and a virtual character provides psychological advice and guides them as they explore simulated environments (such as a cafe or a busy street).

=== Medications ===
Antidepressant medications most commonly used to treat anxiety disorders are mainly selective serotonin reuptake inhibitors. Benzodiazepines, monoamine oxidase inhibitors, and tricyclic antidepressants are also sometimes prescribed for treatment of agoraphobia. Antidepressants are important because some have anxiolytic effects. Antidepressants should be used in conjunction with exposure as a form of self-help or with cognitive behavioral therapy. A combination of medication and cognitive behavioral therapy is sometimes the most effective treatment for agoraphobia.

=== Alternative medicine ===
Eye movement desensitization and reprocessing (EMDR) has been studied as a possible treatment for agoraphobia, with poor results. As such, EMDR is only recommended in cases where cognitive-behavioral approaches have proven ineffective or in cases where agoraphobia has developed following trauma.

Many people with anxiety disorders benefit from joining a self-help or support group (telephone conference-call support groups or online support groups being of particular help for completely housebound individuals). Sharing problems and achievements with others, as well as sharing various self-help tools, are common activities in these groups. In particular, stress management techniques and various kinds of meditation practices and visualization techniques can help people with anxiety disorders calm themselves and may enhance the effects of therapy, as can service to others, which can distract from the self-absorption that tends to go with anxiety problems. Also, preliminary evidence suggests aerobic exercise may have a calming effect. Since caffeine, certain illicit drugs, and even some over-the-counter cold medications can aggravate the symptoms of anxiety disorders, they should be avoided.

== Epidemiology ==
Agoraphobia occurs about twice as often in women as it does in men. Age of onset is typically mid to late twenties, though it can occur at any age.

Panic disorder with or without agoraphobia affects roughly 5.1% of Americans, and about a third of this population with panic disorder have co-morbid agoraphobia. It is uncommon to have agoraphobia without panic attacks, with only 0.17% of people with agoraphobia not presenting with panic disorders as well.

== See also ==
- Hikikomori – Reclusive adolescents or adults
- Hodophobia – Fear of travel
- List of phobias – List of fears of different things or objects

== Sources ==
- This article incorporates public domain material from websites or documents of the National Institute of Mental Health.
- Balaram K, Marwaha R. Agoraphobia. [Updated 2023 Feb 13]. In: StatPearls [Internet]. Treasure Island (FL): StatPearls Publishing; 2024 January ()
