= Thalassophobia =

Fear of the sea or large open water

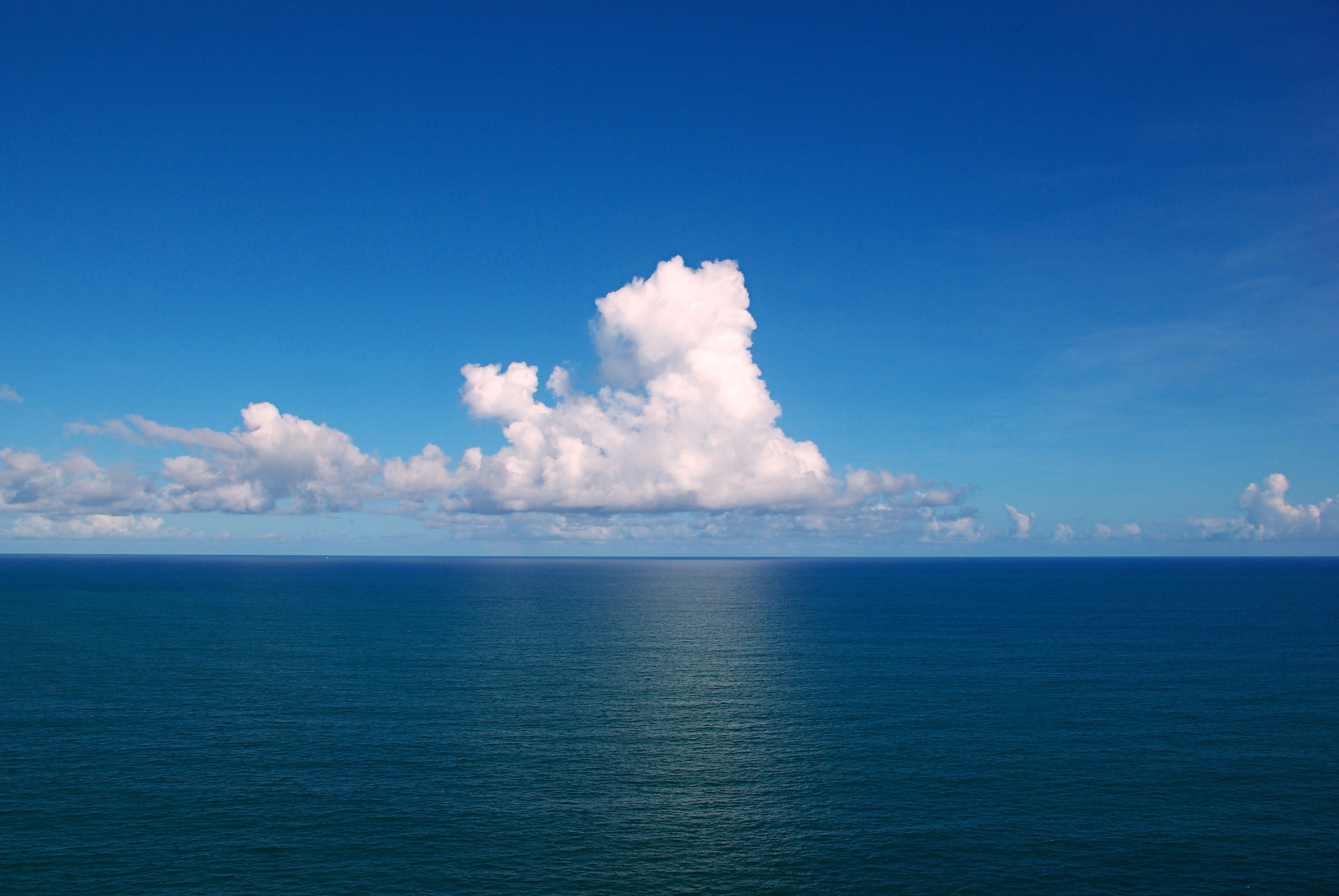
- The Atlantic Ocean, an example of a deep body of water
- Specialty: Psychiatry, clinical psychology
- Duration: More than six months
- Treatment: Systematic desensitisation, exposure therapy, counselling, cognitive behavioural therapy, medication

Thalassophobia (from Ancient Greek θάλασσα (thálassa) 'sea' and φόβος (phóbos) 'fear') is the persistent and intense fear of deep bodies of water, such as the ocean, seas, or lakes. Though related, thalassophobia should not be confused with aquaphobia, which is classified as the fear of water itself. Thalassophobia can include fears of being in deep bodies of water, the vastness of the sea, sea waves, aquatic animals, and great distance from land.

The causes of thalassophobia are not clear and are a subject of research by medical professionals as they can vary greatly between individuals. Researchers have proposed that the fear of large bodies of water is partly a human evolutionary response, and may also be related to popular culture influences which induce fright and distress. It is also theorized that the underlying psychology of the phobia stems from the symbolic nature of water. Specifically, the vastness of the sea is often connected to one's deep unconscious.

The severity of thalassophobia and the signs and symptoms associated with it are fluid and complex. People with thalassophobia experience numerous episodes of emotional and physical anguish caused by a variety of triggers. Treatment may comprise a combination of therapy and anxiolytics and is most effective when administered to patients during childhood, when thalassophobia is generally at its peak.

== Causes ==
=== Evolution ===
The fear of large bodies of water is thought to be an evolutionary and ancestral trait passed on from generation to generation. Humans prefer certainty to risk and adapt based on learning history and situational variables. A 2016 study by Nicholas Carleton establishes that the 'Fear of Unknown' is an evolutionary mechanism that has driven the survival of the human species since the beginning. Showing fear toward deep bodies of water is in effect justified since in ancient times humans understood that their survival was reliant on remaining in terrestrial land and not aquatic environments. This in return developed into a fundamental fear passing down from generation to generation to ensure the survival of human kind.

Martin Antony, Professor of Psychology at Toronto Metropolitan University and co-author of The Anti-Anxiety Workbook, states that: "[f]rom an evolutionary perspective, it makes sense that humans would develop a tendency to fear and avoid deep water because of all the associated risks". He continues by commenting on the genetic aspect of fears, saying: "[w]e are essentially 'programmed' through evolution to fear some situations (e.g., heights, deep water, snakes) more easily than others (e.g., flowers, teddy bears)"

=== Mythology and popular culture ===
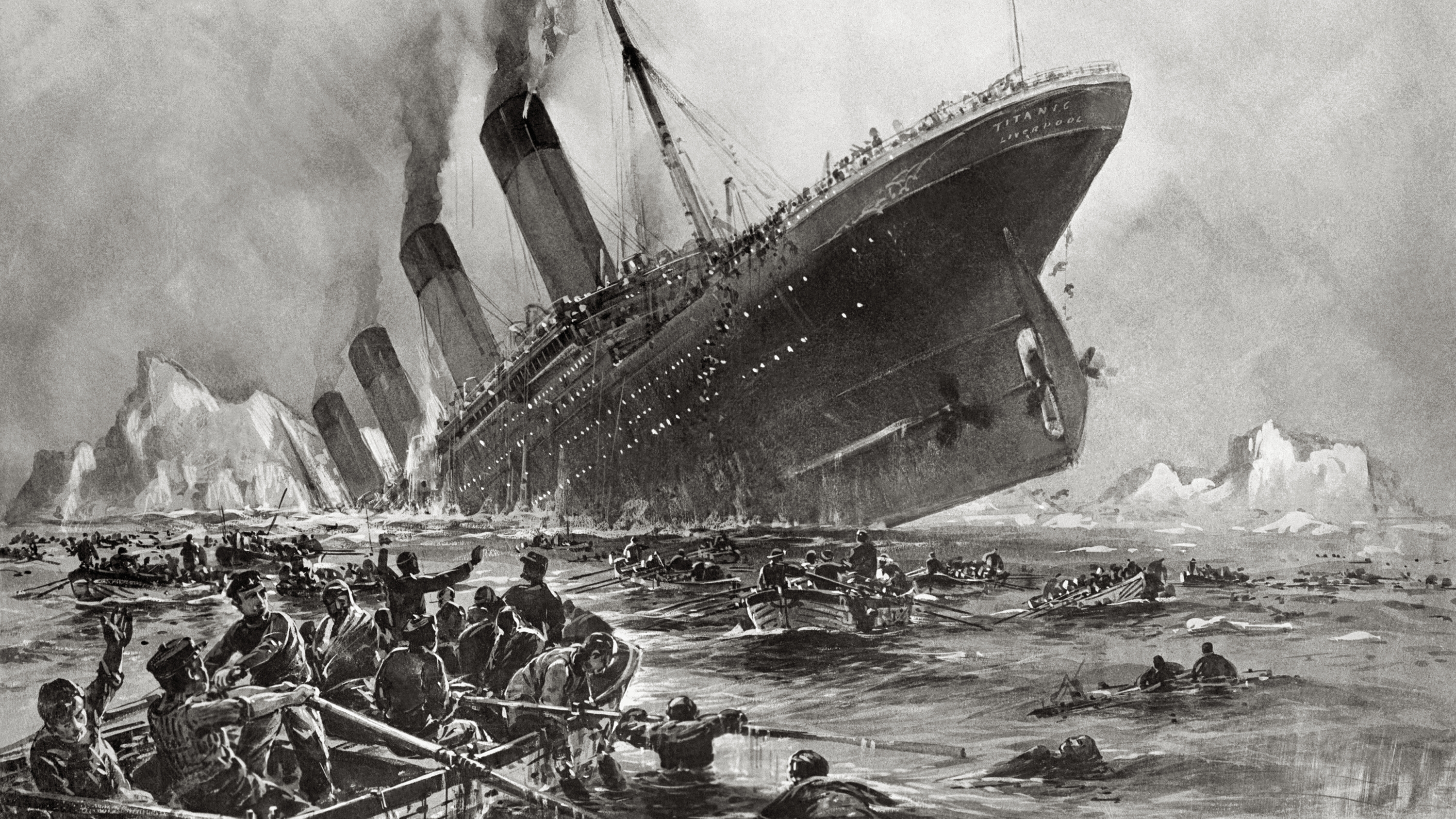
Stories of disasters at sea can contribute to a fear of deep water or exacerbate pre-existing fears

In Jewish and Christian belief systems, the sea is often depicted as a space of disaster and punishment. This is evident in the first book of the Bible (Genesis), through stories such as those of Noah's Ark. Texts like William Shakespeare's The Tempest featured a shipwreck as the driving force behind its narrative and gave the sea an "otherworldly" and "evil" personification. Authors of Beasts of the Deep: Sea Creatures and Popular Culture Sean Harrington and Jon Hackett believe that these narratives are a driving force for the widespread fear of oceans. Literature of the gothic and supernatural have gravitated toward the sea as a fertile environment, and as a result create an unpleasant and fearful image in the minds of audiences. This is thought to be true for both ancient and contemporary societies. The 1975 blockbuster film Jaws is often cited, by pop-culture commentators and moviegoers alike, as the source of a "social contagion" of thalassophobia. The mainstream media also affects the collective emotions of the public. News reports of great white sharks, eels, or other dangerous sea predators attacking swimmers in the ocean induce fear in viewers and are thought to have great influence. Similarly, real cases of ships like the Titanic sinking with their passengers drowning have been made terrifyingly realistic through their movie versions. People who are very afraid of violent death or particularly of drowning are also more likely to develop thalassophobia. These cultural influences (both ancient and modern) are thought to have added to the prevalence of the fear of deep bodies of water throughout time.

=== Past experiences and genetics ===
A negative or past traumatic event can also trigger a deep fear of oceans. Traumatic experiences of being frightened while swimming, or almost drowning are also leading causes of thalassophobia. In addition to this, observing others, particularly parental figures and other influential adults, who also had a fear of deep water are considered contributing factors for developing thalassophobia later in life. Scientists also believe that genetics and biological heredity play a major role in attaining a fear of seas, oceans, and lakes. Such genetic factors include having a family member with thalassophobia, personal mental state such as being negative, sensitive, or anxious, and even hearing terrifying stories on water accidents. Personal experiences and one's upbringing are all factors that could potentially be the cause of thalassophobia.

=== Psychological theories ===
Thalassophobia is often explained as a primal fear. Considering that humans are land mammals and rely on eyesight to collect food, it is evolutionarily coded into humans' lives that the deep sea opposes that environment. Marc Carlin explains the phobia as, "We all have this fear of darkness because we can't see and we rely on our vision to protect us. If you shut your eyes and you can't see, now you have to rely on senses that you don't normally rely upon." He goes on to explain that without using the senses that they normally use, it places humans at a deficit, causing a fear of the dark and deepness.

Carl Jung, a Swiss psychiatrist, studied the archetypes in the collective unconscious. Archetypes are hidden meanings in symbols and messages in society. The collective unconscious are a society's unconscious thinking that is universal for everyone. Jung mentions in his study that water is a popular archetype in the collective unconscious as a reflection of one's darkest thoughts and desires.

Harrington argues that in Freudian terms, one's ego, or one's true identity is not completely aligned with their complete reality. It is theorized that all of one's darkest and repressed thoughts and desires are reflected in the water causing a feeling of dread and fear. Harrington hypothesizes that in the same way, how the ocean is perceived, or what we have been able to discover, may not completely align with the uncharted possibilities that the ocean could hold, resulting in a fear of what the ocean could hold, such as sea monsters. The reflection and comparison of one's mind to the ocean can be a signal of the unfamiliarity of one's mind and identity, resulting in thalassophobia.

=== Triggers ===
Many things can trigger thalassophobia, such as coming in contact with or thinking about the ocean, lakes, boats, swimming, scuba diving, submarines, sea creatures, or photographs and movies about anything stated. Others may not be afraid of what is inside but may be afraid of the emptiness of the ocean. Discussing the ocean could trigger many people's thalassophobia without having to see an image or be around the large bodies of water. Everyone's triggers to this phobia are different depending on how intense thalassophobia is to the individual.

== Diagnosis and symptoms ==
Thalassophobia is characterized by certain physical and emotional traits exhibited by an individual. The reaction that those with thalassophobia show toward large bodies of water (beaches, oceans, lakes) does not match the level of danger that the water poses to them. Hence, they illustrate abnormal behavior under situations or environments which trigger their fear. Anxiety-induced phobia such as thalassophobia presents itself through specific signs and symptoms. Individuals with a moderate fear of deep bodies of water may experience agitation and restlessness on a day-to-day basis.

Common emotional symptoms of thalassophobia include:

- Constant worrying
- Trouble falling or staying asleep (possibly insomnia)
- Panic and anxiety-attacks
- Having a sense of imminent doom
- Needing to escape
- Feeling detached from the situation
- Being overwhelmed

Common physical symptoms of thalassophobia include:

- Shortness of breath
- Sweating
- Shaking or trembling at the sight of the sea
- Weeping or running away when near deep bodies of water
- Nausea
- Dizziness
- Rapid breathing
- Screaming and/or shouting at the sight of the sea

According to the 'Diagnostic and Statistical Manual of Mental Disorders (fifth edition)' (DSM-5) which is a manual for assessment and diagnosis of mental disorders developed by the American Psychiatric Association; to be diagnosed with a phobia of deep bodies of water:

- The individual's fear of deep water must be persistent, excessive, and unreasonable
- The individual must feel this fear every time they are exposed to deep or open water
- The individual either avoids the ocean or other open bodies of water or endures them with intense fear
- The individual's fear of large bodies of water limits and interferes with their normal functioning
- The individual's fear has been present for six months or longer

The prevalence and frequency of thalassophobia or any phobia is unknown for the most part. Researchers have concluded that the severity and prevalence of thalassophobia is in a constant state of change amongst different demographics and many may not be aware that they have mild thalassophobia.

=== Difference between thalassophobia and aquaphobia ===
Thalassophobia differs from aquaphobia, or the fear of water. Aquaphobia is characterized by a general feeling of panic due to water, while thalassophobia deals more with the vastness of that water as well as what that depth could hold. While both phobias deal with the water, aquaphobia can be triggered by a single event while thalassophobia draws from an element of one's own subconscious as to what is in the water.

== Treatment ==
Individuals with thalassophobia often improve their symptoms from specific strategies and procedures employed by therapists and medical professionals. It is extremely important to note that if left untreated, thalassophobia could lead to other mental disorders such as post-traumatic stress-disorder, anxiety, depression, and/or panic-attacks.

=== Cognitive behavioral therapy ===
Thalassophobia can be managed through a psychological tool known as cognitive behavioral therapy (CBT). CBT is a type of psychotherapeutic treatment that helps patients learn how to identify and manipulate disturbing thought patterns into positive and realistic behaviors. Psychologists and therapists employ CBT to inflict a negative influence on certain behavior and emotions so that they will be replaced by more appropriate and realistic reactions. A meta-analysis study in 2013 found that CBT has a positive effect in changing the neural pathways and activation of the brain on patients with phobias, resulting in more controlled behavior when exposed to the fear.

=== Systematic desensitization ===
Systematic desensitization is a treatment in which patients with certain phobias are exposed to increasingly more anxiety-provoking stimuli and taught relaxation techniques simultaneously. Majority of individuals who have thalassophobia actively avoid the situation they are afraid of, which in return creates a false and even more frightening fake reality. Systematic desensitization techniques allow patients to confront their fear with controlled emotions and realistic views. It involves three steps, the first involves learning muscle relaxation techniques followed by patients being asked to create a list of fearful scenarios, ranking them in terms of their intensity. Finally, the patients are instructed to face their fear on a gradual spectrum. The focus of this technique is to focus on relaxation as they put themselves through stressful situations until the environment/event no longer causes discomfort. The underlying theory behind systemic desensitization is classical conditioning which aims to replace feelings of fear and anxiety with a state of calm. Relaxation techniques taught for dealing with thalassophobia through systemic desensitization include diaphragmatic breathing, progressive muscle relaxation, meditation, and mindfulness.

=== Exposure therapy ===
Exposure therapy is the act of an individual coming into close contact with the situation or environment that triggers their phobia in a safe way. The overall goal of exposure therapy is to prove to the patient that a situation, object, or environment is not as dangerous or worrisome as they might believe. This treatment also allows patients to feel more confident in their ability to cope with the situation that frightens them; should they face the situation they are afraid of. In the case of thalassophobia, exposure therapy is employed to lessen the fear and anxiety associated with large bodies of water. There are several variations of exposure therapy and psychologists may use different techniques to achieve optimal results. These variations include:

In vivo exposure: This is a technique whereby patients are instructed to directly face a feared object, situation, or activity in real life. Those with thalassophobia are often instructed to enter the water at beaches, lakes, or ponds. The downside of in vivo exposure is that participants have high dropout rates and poor treatment acceptance compared to other therapy options.

Interoceptive exposure: Deliberately inducing harmless physical sensations, yet feared. For instance, individuals with thalassophobia are often shown images of the sea, oceans, lakes, or video footage of people in water. This induces a reaction which can then be changed or manipulated by the therapist.

Virtual reality exposure: In certain circumstances, virtual reality technology can be employed when in vivo exposure is not practical. This could include when an individual doesn't reside near beaches, oceans, or lakes. It can also include when some other factor inhibits the patient from entering such environments (including health, personal, or religious factors).

Imaginal exposure: Vividly imagining the feared situation, object, or environment. This technique is commonly used for those who have had a past traumatic experience or witnessed an event leading to their diagnosis of thalassophobia. It allows individuals to reduce their feelings of fear regarding certain triggers.

=== Medication ===
Most improve or eliminate all their symptoms of thalassophobia through therapy. Others might require a combination of therapy and medication to treat their symptoms accurately. Medication alone cannot cure phobias such as thalassophobia. It can, however, help reduce symptoms of anxiety and fear. Selective serotonin reuptake inhibitors (commonly known as SSRIs) are a type of antidepressant which can be prescribed by a qualified physician. Other common medication used for treating thalassophobia include beta blockers (which assist by blocking the flow of adrenaline that occurs when one is anxious) and benzodiazepines (fast-acting anti-anxiety medication). Benzodiazepines should be prescribed only when other therapeutic or medicinal options have not worked as they are sedative and addicting.

== See also ==
- Aquaphobia
- List of phobias
- Hodophobia - The phobia of travel
- Phobia
- Sinking of the Titanic
- Specific phobia
- Submechanophobia - The fear of man-made submerged objects
