= Virtual reality therapy =

Alternative form of exposure therapy

- Other names: Computerized CBT

Virtual reality therapy (VRT), also known as virtual reality immersion therapy (VRIT), simulation for therapy (SFT), virtual reality exposure therapy (VRET), and computerized CBT (CCBT), is the use of virtual reality technology for psychological or occupational therapy and in affecting virtual rehabilitation. Patients receiving virtual reality therapy navigate through digitally created environments and complete specially designed tasks often tailored to treat a specific ailment; it is designed to isolate the user from their surrounding sensory inputs and give the illusion of immersion inside a computer-generated, interactive virtual environment. This technology has a demonstrated clinical benefit as an adjunctive analgesic during burn wound dressing and other painful medical procedures. Technology can range from a simple PC and keyboard setup, to a modern virtual reality headset. It is widely used as an alternative form of exposure therapy, in which patients interact with harmless virtual representations of traumatic stimuli in order to reduce fear responses. It has proven to be especially effective at treating PTSD, and shows considerable promise in treating a variety of neurological and physical conditions. Virtual reality therapy has also been used to help stroke patients regain muscle control, to treat other disorders such as body dysmorphia, and to improve social skills in those diagnosed with autism.

== Description ==
Virtual reality therapy (VRT) uses specially programmed computers, visual immersion devices and artificially created environments to give the patient a simulated experience that can be used to diagnose and treat psychological conditions that cause difficulties for patients. In many environmental phobias, reaction to the perceived hazards, such as heights, speaking in public, flying, close spaces, are usually triggered by visual and auditory stimuli. In VR-based therapies, the virtual world is a means of providing artificial, controlled stimuli in the context of treatment, and with a therapist able to monitor the patient's reaction. Unlike traditional cognitive behavioral therapy, VR-based treatment may involve adjusting the virtual environment, such as for example adding controlled intensity smells or adding and adjusting vibrations, and allow the clinician to determine the triggers and triggering levels for each patient's reaction. VR-based therapy systems may allow replaying virtual scenes, with or without adjustment, to habituate the patient to such environments. Therapists who apply virtual reality exposure therapy, just as those who apply in-vivo exposure therapy, can take one of two approaches concerning the intensity of exposure. The first approach is called flooding, which refers to the most intense approach where stimuli that produce the most anxiety are presented first. For soldiers who have developed PTSD from combat, this could mean first exposing them to a virtual reality scene of their fellow troops being shot or injured followed by less stressful stimuli such as only the sounds of war. On the other hand, what is referred to as graded-exposure takes a more relaxed approach in which the least distressing stimuli are introduced first. VR-exposure, as compared to in-vivo exposure has the advantage of providing the patient a vivid experience, without the associated risks or costs. VRT has great promise since it historically produces a "cure" about 90% of the time at about half the cost of traditional cognitive behavior therapy authority, and is especially promising as a treatment for PTSD where there are simply not enough psychologists and psychiatrists to treat all the veterans with anxiety disorders diagnosed as related to their military service.

VRT is also a promising adjunctive therapy for the treatment of other clinical populations, such as individuals with psychosis. A recent systematic review of psychosocial interventions using virtual reality shows these interventions are safe and well accepted in this population. The studies identified in the review show that psychosocial VRT can improve cognitive, social, and vocational skills as well as symptoms of auditory verbal hallucinations and paranoia in individuals with psychosis.

Recently there have been some advances in the field of virtual reality medicine. Virtual reality is a complete immersion of the patient into a virtual world by putting on a headset with an LED screen in the lenses of the headset. This is different from the recent advancements in augmented reality. Augmented reality is different in the sense that it enhances the non-synthetic environment by introducing synthetic elements to the user's perception of the world. This in turn "augments" the current reality and uses virtual elements to build upon the existing environment. Augmented reality poses additional benefits and has proven itself to be a medium through which individuals with a specific phobia can be exposed "safely" to the object(s) of their fear, without the costs associated with programming complete virtual environments. Thus, augmented reality can offer an efficacious alternative to some less advantageous exposure-based therapies.

== History ==
Virtual reality therapy (VRT) was pioneered and originally termed by Max North documented by the first known publication (Virtual Environment and Psychological Disorders, Max M. North, and Sarah M. North, Electronic Journal of Virtual Culture, 2,4, July 1994), his doctoral VRT dissertation completion in 1995 (began in 1992), and followed with the first known published VRT book in 1996 (Virtual Reality Therapy, an Innovative Paradigm, Max M. North, Sarah M. North, and Joseph R. Coble, 1996. IPI Press. ISBN 1-880930-08-0). His pioneered virtual reality technology work began as early as 1992 as a research faculty at Clark Atlanta University and supported by funding from U.S. Army Research Laboratory.

An early exploration in 1993–1994 of VRT was done by Ralph Lamson a USC graduate then at Kaiser Permanente Psychiatry Group. Lamson began publishing his work in 1993. As a psychologist, he was most concerned with the medical and therapeutic aspects, that is, how to treat people using the technology, rather than the apparatus, which was obtained from Division, Inc. Psychology Today reported in 1994 that these 1993–1994 treatments were successful in about 90% of Lamson's virtual psychotherapy patients. Lamson wrote in 1993 a book entitled Virtual Therapy which was published in 1997 directed primarily to the detailed explanation of the anatomical, medical and therapeutic basis for the success of VRT. In 1994–1995, he had solved his own acrophobia in a test use of a third party VR simulation and then set up a 40 patient test funded by Kaiser Permanente. Shortly thereafter, in 1994–1995, Larry Hodges, then a computer scientist at Georgia Tech active in VR, began studying VRT in cooperation with Max North who had reported anomalous behavior in flying carpet simulation VR studies and attributed such to phobic response of unknown nature. Hodges tried to hire Lamson without success in 1994 and instead began working with Barbara Rothbaum, a psychologist at Emory University to test VRT in controlled group tests, experiencing about 70% success among 50% of subjects completing the testing program.

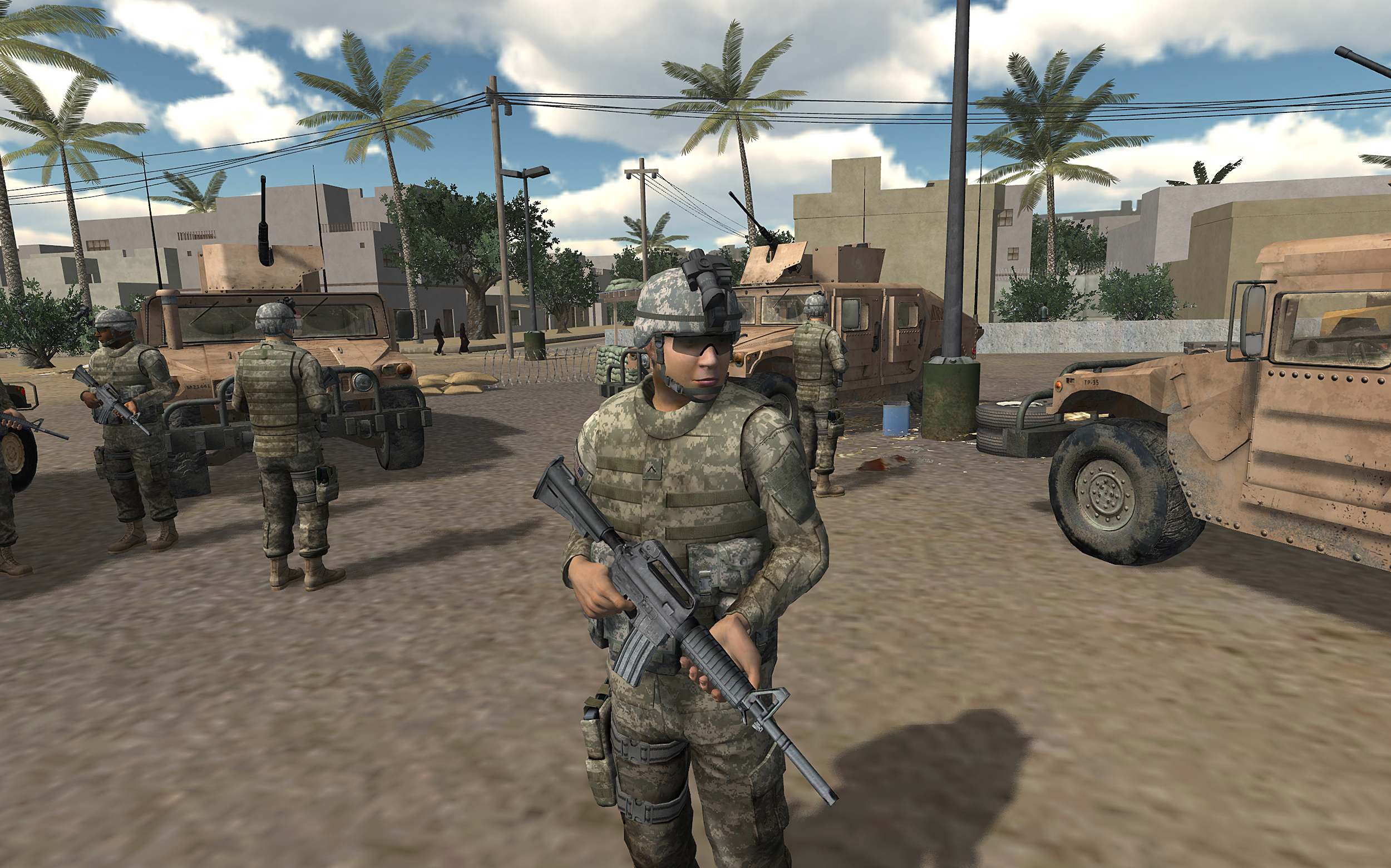
A screen capture of Virtual Iraq

In 2005, Skip Rizzo of USC's Institute for Creative Technologies, with research funding from the Office of Naval Research (ONR), started validating a tool he created using assets from the game Full Spectrum Warrior for the treatment of posttraumatic stress disorder. Virtual Iraq was subsequently evaluated and improved under ONR funding and is supported by Virtually Better, Inc. They also support applications of VR-based therapy for aerophobia, acrophobia, glossophobia, and substance abuse. Virtual Iraq proved successful in normalization of over 70% of people with PTSD, and that has now become a standard accepted treatment by the Anxiety and Depression Association of America. However, the VA has continued to emphasize traditional prolonged exposure therapy as the treatment of choice, and VR-based therapies have gained only limited adoption, despite active promotion by DOD, and despite VRT having much lower cost and apparently higher success rates. A $12-million ONR funded study is currently underway to definitively compare the efficacy of the two methods, PET and VRT. Military labs have subsequently set up dozens of VRT labs and treatment centers for treating both PTSD and a variety of other medical conditions. The use of VRT has thus become a mainstream psychiatric treatment for anxiety disorders and is finding increasing use in the treatment of other cognitive disorders associated with various medical conditions such as addiction, PTSD and schizophrenia.

== Applications ==
=== Psychological therapy ===
==== Exposure therapy ====
Virtual reality technology is especially useful for exposure therapy – a treatment method in which patients are introduced and then slowly exposed to a traumatic stimulus. Inside virtual environments, patients can safely interact with a representation of their phobia, and researchers don't need to have access to a real version of the phobia itself. One of the primary challenges to the efficacy of Exposure therapy is recreating the level of trauma existing in real environments inside a virtual environment. Virtual reality aids in overcoming this by engaging with different sensory stimuli of the patient while heightening the realism and maintaining the safety of the environment.

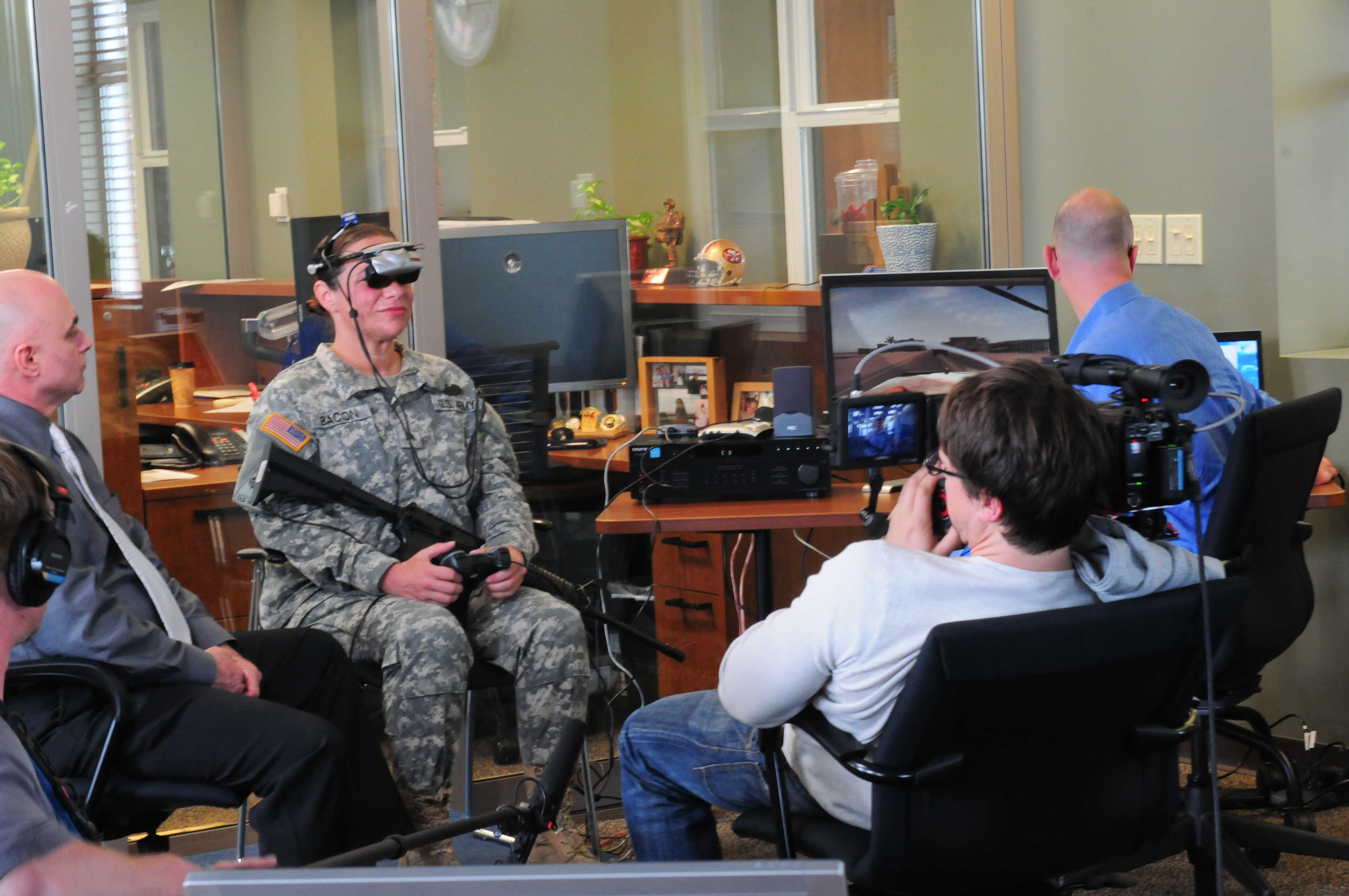
Virtual reality being used in exposure therapy for treating PTSD in documentary crew at Joint Base Lewis-McChord in Washington, United States.

One very successful example of virtual reality therapy exposure therapy is the PTSD treatment system, Virtual Iraq. Using a head mounted display and a game pad, patients navigate a Humvee around virtual recreations of Iraq, Afghanistan, and the United States. By being safely exposed to the traumatic environments, patients learned to reduce their anxiety. According to a review of the history of Virtual Iraq, one study found that it reduced PTSD symptoms by an average of fifty percent, and disqualified over seventy-five percent of participants for PTSD after treatment. Virtual Reality Exposure Therapy (VRET) is also commonly used for treating specific phobias, especially small animal phobia. Commonly feared animals such as spiders can be easily produced in a virtual environment, instead of finding the real animal. For those with low social confidence, Virtual Reality Exposure Therapy can also be used to simulate social situations. VRET has also been used experimentally to treat other fears such as public speaking and claustrophobia.

Another successful study attempted treating 10 individuals who experienced trauma as a result of events during 9/11. Through repeated exposure to increasingly traumatic sequences of World Trade Center events, immediate positive results were self reported by test subjects. In a 6-month follow-up, 9 of the test subjects available for follow up maintained their results from exposure.

Virtual Reality Exposure Therapy (VRET) offers a wide range of advantages compared to traditional exposure therapy techniques. Recent years have suggested an increase in familiarly and trust in virtual reality technology as an acceptable mirror of reality. A higher trust in the technology could lead to more effective treatment results as more phobics seek out help. Another consideration for VRET is the cost effectiveness. While the actual cost of VRET may vary based on the hardware and software implementation, it is supposedly more effective than the traditional in vivo treatment used for exposure therapy while maintaining a positive return on investment. Future research might pave an alternative to extensive automated lab or hospital environments. For instance, in 2011, researchers at York University proposed an affordable virtual reality exposure therapy (VRET) system for the treatment of phobias that could be set up at home. Such developments in VRET may pave a new way of customised treatment that also tackles the stigma attached to clinical treatment. While there is still a lot unknown about the long-term effectiveness of the relatively new VRET, the future seems promising with growing studies reflecting the benefits of VRET to combat phobias.

=== Virtual rehabilitation ===
The term virtual rehabilitation was coined in 2002 by Professor Daniel Thalmann of EPFL (Switzerland) and Professor Grigore Burdea of Rutgers University (USA). In their view the term applies to both physical therapy and cognitive interventions (such as for patients with Post Traumatic Stress Disorder, phobias, anxieties, attention deficits or amnesia). Since 2008, the virtual rehabilitation "community" has been supported by the International Society on Virtual Rehabilitation.

Virtual rehabilitation is a concept in psychology in which a therapeutic patient's training is based entirely on, or is augmented by, virtual reality simulation exercises. If there is no conventional therapy provided, the rehabilitation is said to be "virtual reality-based". Otherwise, if virtual rehabilitation is in addition to conventional therapy, the intervention is "virtual reality-augmented." Today, a majority of the population uses the virtual environment to navigate their daily lives and almost one fourth of the world population uses the internet. As a result, virtual rehabilitation and gaming rehabilitation, or rehabilitation through gaming consoles, have become quite common. In fact, virtual therapy has been used over regular therapeutic methods in order to treat a number of disorders.

Some factors to consider when virtual rehabilitation include cultural sensitivity, accessibility, and ability to finance the virtual therapy.

==== Advantages ====
Virtual rehabilitation offers a number of advantages compared to conventional therapeutic methods:

- It is entertaining, thus motivating the patient;
- Potential for involvement of the patients' stimulus modalities for more realistic environments for treatment.
- It provides objective outcome measures of therapy efficacy (limb velocity, range of movement, error rates, game scores, etc.);
- These data are transparently stored by the computer running the simulation and can be made available on the Internet.
- Virtual rehabilitation can be performed in the patient's home and monitored at a distance (becoming telerehabilitation)
- The patient feels more actively involved in the desensitization
- The patient may "forget" they are in treatment or undergoing observation resulting in more authentic expressions.
- Effective for hospitals to reduce their costs because of lowered cost of medicine and equipment.
- Great impact of virtual reality on pain relief

=== Disadvantages ===
Despite all the merits of VR therapy as listed in the sections above, there are pitfalls and obstacles in the development of widespread VR solutions.

- Cost effectiveness: VRET may show promising returns on investment but the fact remains that the true development cost of VRET environments depends heavily on the choice of hardware and software chosen.
- Treatment effectiveness: For the treatment to take effect, a patient should be able to successfully project and experience their anxiety in a virtual environment. Unfortunately, this projection is highly subjective and personalised per patient; and outside the control of the therapists. This limitation might adversely impact the therapy.
- Migrating back to reality from virtual reality: Another skepticism is the correlation between virtual reality and actual reality. If a patient successfully combats their phobia in a virtual environment, does that guarantee success in real life too? Further, when treating more complicated ailments such as schizophrenia, there is inadequate projection on how delusions and hallucinations may translate from the real world to the virtual one.
- VR sickness: Movement in a virtual environment is said to cause visual discomfort. Prolonged periods of exposure to VR may lead to side effects like dry eyes, headaches, nausea and sweating; symptoms similar to motion sickness.
- Ethical and legal considerations: Since VR is a relatively new technology, its ethical implications are not as comprehensive as other forms of treatment. There is a need to formalize the limits, side effects, disclaimers, privacy regulations as we increase the breadth of impact of VR therapy; especially in matters related to forensic cases.
- Acceptance by the medical community: As VR-based therapy increases, it might pose a challenge to licensed therapists and medical professionals who may perceive VR as a threat. After all, VR deviates from the pre-established norm of "talking cure" .

== Therapeutical targets ==
=== Depression ===
In February 2006 the UK's National Institute of Health and Clinical Excellence (NICE) recommended that VRT be made available for use within the NHS across England and Wales, for patients presenting with mild/moderate depression, rather than immediately opting for antidepressant medication. Some areas have developed, or are trialing.

At Auckland University in New Zealand, a team led by Dr. Sally Merry have been developing a computerized CBT fantasy "serious" game to help tackle depression amongst adolescents. The game, Sparx, has a number of features to help combat depression, where the user takes on a role of a character who travels through a fantasy world, combating "literal" negative thoughts and learning techniques to manage their depression.

=== Schizophrenia ===
Avatar Therapy is a form of therapy that can be delivered through virtuality reality designed for people with schizophrenia who experience distressing auditory hallucinations, particularly hearing hostile voices. In this therapy, patients engage in real-time, face-to-face dialogue with a digital avatar that represents the voice they hear. The therapist operates the avatar, allowing it to verbally communicate with the patient in a controlled and safe environment. Over time, the patient learns to confront and reduce the power of the hallucination, often finding relief from its intensity and frequency. Avatar therapy aims to help patients gain control over their symptoms, reduce distress, and improve overall mental health.

This therapy is grounded in the idea that giving a "face" and voice to auditory hallucinations can help individuals reframe their relationship with these experiences. Avatar therapy has shown promising results in clinical trials, demonstrating improvements in reducing the impact of auditory hallucinations compared to standard treatment options. It is part of a broader effort to utilize VR and other innovative technologies in mental health care for conditions like schizophrenia.

=== Eating disorders and body dysmorphia ===
Virtual reality therapy has also been used to attempt to treat eating disorders and body dysmorphia. One study in 2013 had participants complete various tasks in virtual reality environments which could not have been easily replicated without the technology. Tasks included showing patients the implications of reaching their desired weight, comparing their actual body shape to an avatar created using their perceived body size, and altering a virtual reflection to match their actual body size.

=== Gender dysphoria ===
Early research suggests that virtual reality experiences may offer therapeutic benefits to transgender individuals experiencing gender dysphoria. More experimentation and professional examination is needed before virtual reality could be prescribed as a treatment in practice. However, some transgender individuals have engaged in what can be characterized as an anecdotally alleviating form of self-administered, virtual sex reassignment therapy. Digital spaces offer a form of anonymous self-expression that trans individuals, due to exposure of discrimination and violence, are not fully granted to them in real life or IRL. The sophistication of virtual reality expands on these newfound liberties by providing an avenue for those with gender dysphoria to embody their gender identity, if it not accessible for them to do so in their real life. Through use of available VR videogames and chat rooms, those with gender dysphoria can create avatars of themselves, interact anonymously, and work towards therapeutic goals.

=== Acrophobia ===
A study published in The Lancet Psychiatry proved that virtual reality therapy can help treat acrophobia. Over the course of the study, participants were introduced to intimidating heights in a virtual reality environment then asked to complete various activities at those heights while under the supervision and support of a coach. This study, although insufficient in terms of scope and scrutiny for direct adoption into remedial practices, surrounds future research and treatment modeling with promise, as a majority of the participants considered themselves no longer afraid of heights.

=== Glossophobia ===
As an alternative to in vivo and in vitro exposure therapy, VRET has emerged as an effective intervention for individuals experiencing glossophobia and it overcomes some of the limitations of traditional CBT. VRET simulates public speaking scenarios and evokes anxiety responses comparable to real-world experiences, enabling gradual desensitization within a safe setting.

Innovations in VRET design have focused on user engagement. Dr. Chris Macdonald from the University of Cambridge developed an open-access VR platform compatible with smartphones, headsets and laptops. The system immerses users in simulated speaking environments with gradual exposure to anxiety-inducing stimuli, ranging from small classrooms to large stadium with 10,000 highly-distracting virtual spectators. A single 30 minute session experiment with 29 adolescents reported a substantial reduction in public speaking anxiety using the VR platform, as reported in leading academic journal Frontiers

=== Physical therapy ===
==== Stroke ====
Research suggests that patients who had a stroke found virtual reality (VR) rehab techniques in their Physical Therapy treatment plans very beneficial. Throughout a rehabilitation program aimed to restore and/or retain balance and walking skills, patients who have had a stroke often must relearn how to control certain muscles. In most physical therapy settings, this is done through high intensity, repetitive, and task-specific practice. Programs of this type can prove to be physically demanding, are expensive, and require several days of training per week. Additionally, regimens may seem redundant, and produce only modest and/or delayed effects in patient recovery. A physical therapy regimen using VR provides an opportunity to individualize training to fit the specific needs of the patient. While the exercises and movements required for proper motor learning can seem repetitive, using VR adds a level of intrigue and engagement for the patient. Training with VR enhances motor learning by giving the patient opportunities to practice their movements/exercise protocol in different VR environments. This ensures that patients are always challenged and may be better prepared to perform in their environments. Feedback is an important element of physical therapy for patients recovering from stroke and/or other neuromuscular disorders. Within the scope of motor learning, receiving feedback during performance of a task improves the learning rate. According to a Cochrane Review, visual feedback, specifically, has been shown to aid in balance recovery for patients who have had a stroke. VR can provide continuous visual feedback that a physical therapist may not be able to during their sessions. Results have also suggested that in addition to improvements in balance, positive effects are also seen in walking ability. In one study, patients with VR training coupled with their physical therapy program had better improvements in walking speed than others not using VR training. The most recent review about the effect of VR training on balance and gait ability showed significant benefits of VR training on gait speed, Berg Balance Scale (BBS) scores, and Timed "Up & Go" Test scores when VR was time dose matched to conventional therapy.

==== Parkinson's disease ====
Many studies (Cochrane Review) have shown that using VR technology during physical therapy treatments for patients with Parkinson's disease had positive outcomes. For patients with PD the VR therapy:

- Increased gait and balance.
- Improved functions of activities of daily living (ADL's).
- Improved quality of life.
- Improved cognitive function.

It is speculated that these improvements occurred because the VR gave increased feedback to the patient regarding their performance during the VR sessions. VR stimulates a patient's motor and cognitive processes, both of which may be impaired as a result of the disease. Another benefit of VR is that it replicates real life scenarios, allowing patients to practice functional activities.

==== Wound care ====
Additionally, VR provides beneficial outcomes when it is implemented for patients who are receiving wound care rehabilitation. Studies have speculated that the more immersive the VR, the greater the experience and concentration the patient will have on the virtual environment. Equally important, VR has shown to reduce pain, anxiety and depressive symptoms, as well as an increasing their treatment adherence.

In other studies, the results point to the benefits of VR in relation to increased distraction, and patients reported less time thinking about pain, less intense pain and immersion, which facilitates care such as dressing changes and physiotherapy.

Wound dressing often generates a pain-provoking experience. Therefore, use of VR was related to more efficient dressings, increased distraction from the pain during procedures (e.g. dressing and physical rehabilitation) which reduced the patients' stress and anxiety.

==== Cardiovascular ====
The use of VR and video games could be considered as complementary tools for physical training in patients with Cardiovascular diseases. Certain games designed for exercise have been shown to promote increases in heart rate, fatigue perception, and physical activity. In addition, it has been shown to reduce pain and increase adherence to physical therapy programs in patients with cardiovascular diseases. Finally, virtual reality and video games enhance motivation and adherence in cardiac rehabilitation programs.

=== Occupational therapy ===
==== Autism ====
Virtual reality has been shown to improve the social skills of young adults with autism. In one study, participants controlled a virtual avatar in different virtual environments and maneuvered through various social tasks such as interviewing, meeting new people, and dealing with arguments. Researchers found that participants improved in the areas of emotional recognition in voices and faces and in considering the thoughts of other people. Participants were also surveyed months after the study for how effective they thought the treatments were, and the responses were overwhelmingly positive. Many other studies have also explored this occupational therapy option.

==== Attention deficit hyperactivity disorder ====
A clinical trial published in the Journal of Attention Disorders found that school age children with ADHD who underwent a virtual classroom cognitive treatment series were able to achieve the same management of symptoms of impulsivity and distractibility as children who were medicated with a stimulant.

==== Post-traumatic stress disorder ====
It may also be possible to use virtual reality to assist those with PTSD. The virtual reality allows the patients to relive their combat situations at different extremes as a therapist can be there with them guiding them through the process. Some scholars believe that this is an effective way to treat PTSD patients as it allows for the recreation of exactly what they experienced. "It allows for greater engagement by the patient and, consequently, greater activation of the traumatic memory, which is necessary for the extinction of the conditioned fear."

==== Stroke ====
Virtual reality also has applications in the physical side of occupational therapy. For stroke patients, various virtual reality technologies can help bring fine control back to different muscle groups. Therapy often includes games controlled with haptic-feedback controllers that require fine movements, such as playing piano with a virtual hand. The Wii gaming system has also been used in conjunction with virtual reality as a treatment method.

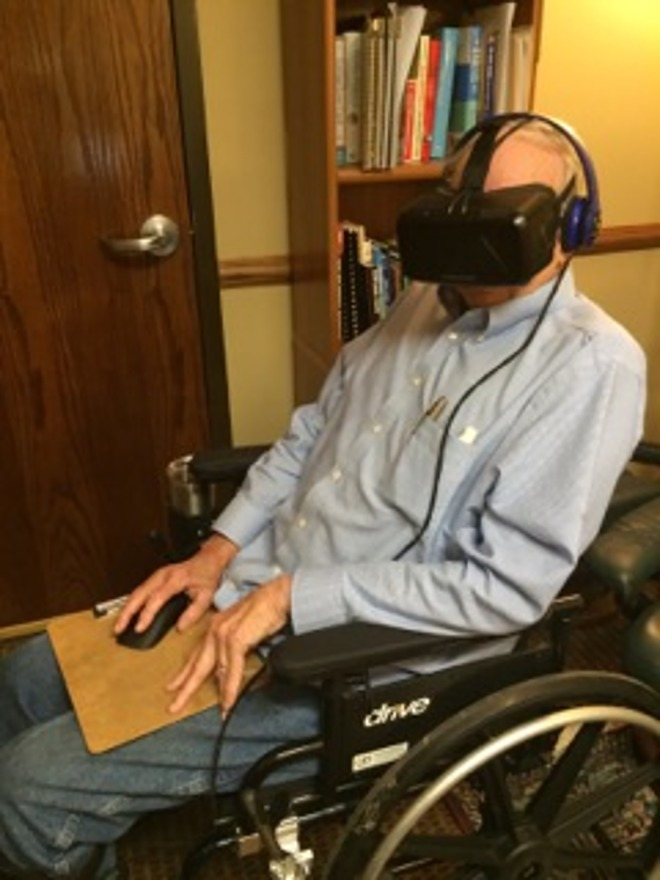
The impact of virtual reality on chronic pain.

=== Chronic and acute pain ===
Virtual reality (VR) has been shown to be effective in immediately decreasing procedural or acute pain. To date there have been few studies on its efficacy in chronic pain. Such chronic pain patients can tolerate the VR session without the side effects that sometimes come with VR such as headaches, dizziness or nausea.

=== Neurological Rehabilitation ===
Virtual reality is also helping patients overcome balance and mobility problems resulting from stroke or head injury. In the study of VR, the modest advantage of VR over conventional training supports further investigation of the effect of video-capture VR or VR combined with conventional therapy in larger-scale randomized, more intense controlled studies. It shows the VR-assisted patients had better mobility when the doctors checked in two months later. Other research has shown similarly successful outcomes for patients with cerebral palsy undergoing rehab for balance problems.

Therapeutic goals of VR in children with cerebral palsy target balance, walking, and enhancing function of real-world activities. Several randomized controlled trials found that VR therapy significantly improved balance and walking in children with cerebral palsy. Studies also found significant improvements in upper extremity function and postural control after VR therapy. VR interventions were more effective in younger patients, likely as there is greater neuroplasticity during development.

Advantages of VR include increased patient motivation through gamification and the creation of virtual spaces that are safe and therapeutically supportive. Children may repeat therapeutic tasks more often than with conventional modalities alone, more easily meeting the repetitions required for structural, neurological change. Functional MRI studies of cerebral palsy patients with upper limb involvement suggest that VR therapy can lead to neuroplastic changes in the sensory motor cortex, and subsequent improvements in motor function.

Provider peer training and VR therapies collaboratively developed by engineers, providers, and patients, lead to improved outcomes in provider competency and patient motor function. While commercially available VR gaming systems can be therapeutically effective, VR systems engineered to meet specific therapeutic needs additionally account for engagement in tasks, relevance of the virtual environment, appropriate feedback sensors and monitors. VR that mimics the complexity of real-world tasks improves skills transfer from virtual to real environments. Complex tasks permit infinite path variability for each movement necessary to complete the task. Multiple possible solutions allow the patient to critically think through a task and to develop adaptive solutions for their body, further improving outcomes.

=== Surgery ===
VR smoothly blurs the demarcation between the physical world and the computer simulation as surgeons can use latest versions of virtual reality glasses to interact in a three-dimensional space with the organ that requires surgical treatment, view it from any desired angle and able to switch between 3D view and the real CT images.

== Efficiency ==
Randomized, tightly controlled, acrophobia treatment trials at Kaiser Permanente provided >90% effectiveness, conducted in 1993–94. (Ext. Ref. 2, pg. 71) Of 40 patients treated, 38 showed marked reduction in phobic reaction to heights and self-reported reaching their goals. Research found that VRT allows patients to achieve victory over virtual height situations they could not confront in real life, and that gradually increasing the height and danger in a virtual environment produced increasing victories and greater self-confidence in the patient that they could actually confront the situation in real life. "Virtual therapy interventions empower people. The simulation technology of virtual reality lends itself to mastery oriented treatment ... Rather than coping with threats, phobics manage progressively more threatening aspects in a computer-generated environment ... The range of applications can be extended by enhancing the realness and interactivity so that actions elicit reactions from the environments in which individuals immerse themselves" (Ext. Ref. 3, pg. 331–332).

Another study examined the effectiveness of virtual reality therapy in treating military combat personnel recently returning from the current conflicts in Iraq and Afghanistan. Rauch, Eftekhari and Ruzek conducted a study with a sample of 42 combat servicemen who were already diagnosed with chronic PTSD (post-traumatic stress disorder). These combat servicemen were pre-screened using several different diagnostic self-reports including the PTSD military checklist, a screening tool used by the military in the determination of the intensity of the diagnosis of PTSD by measuring the presence of PTSD symptoms. Although 22 of the servicemen dropped out of the study, the results of the study concerning the 20 remaining servicemen still has merit. The servicemen were given the same diagnostic tests after the study which consisted of multiple sessions of virtual reality exposure and virtual reality exposure therapy. The servicemen showed much improvement in the diagnostic scores, signaling a decrease of symptoms of PTSD. Likewise, a three-month follow-up diagnostic screening was also administered after the initial sessions that were undergone by the servicemen. The results of this study showed that 15 of the 20 participants no longer met diagnostic criteria for PTSD and improved their PTSD military checklist score by 50% for the assessment following the study. Even though only 17 of the 20 participants participated in the 3-month follow-up screening, 13 of the 17 still did not meet the criteria for PTSD and maintained their 50% improvement in the PTSD military checklist score. These results show promising effects and help to validate virtual reality therapy as an efficacious mode of therapy for the treatment of PTSD (McLay, et al., 2012).

VR combined real instrument training was effective at promoting recovery of patients' upper-extremity and cognitive function, and thus may be an innovative translational neurorehabilitation strategy after stroke. In the study, the experimental group showed greater therapeutic effects in a time-dependent manner than the control group, especially on the motor power of wrist extension, spasticity of elbow flexion and wrist extension, and Box and Block Tests. Patients in the experimental group, but not the control group, also showed significant improvements on the lateral, palmar, and tip pinch power, Box and Block, and 9-HPTs from before to immediately after training.

== Continued development ==
Larry Hodges, formerly of Georgia Tech and now Clemson University and Barbara Rothbaum of Emory University, have done extensive work in VRT, and also have several patents and founded a company, Virtually Better, Inc.

In the United States, the United States Department of Defense (DOD) continues funding of VRT research and is actively using VR in treatment of PTSD.

Millions of funding is being put towards developments and early trials in the realm of virtual reality as companies race for FDA approval for their medical applications.

=== Academic and government research projects ===
==== BRAVEMIND software ====
In 2014, a virtual reality application used as a prolonged exposure (PE) therapy tool for military related trauma called BRAVEMIND was reported BRAVEMIND is as an acronym for Battlefield Research Accelerating Virtual Environments for Military Individual Neuro Disorders. Virtual reality exposure therapy (VRET) applications have been used to assist civilian populations with anxieties about flying, public speaking, and heights. BRAVEMIND has been studied in populations of military medics as well as survivors of military sexual assault and combat. This technology was developed by researchers at the University of the Southern California in collaboration with the U.S. Army Research Laboratory.

In 2004, reports stated that 40% of military members experience PTSD but only 23% seek medical help. Emory physicians described one of the strongest indicators of PTSD to be avoidance, saying this inhibits those affected from seeking treatment. PE requires that the patient close their eyes and relate the pertinent episode in as much detail as possible. The methodology was based on the concept that in facing the event, the charge of the triggers may be attenuated over time. The VRET application BRAVEMIND differs from PE in that the patient does not reimagine the episode but instead wears a headset that places them in the familiar environment. This headset is equipped with two screens (one for each eye), headphones, and a position monitor that shifts the visual scene to match the patient's head movements. Depending on the patient's experience they may be standing or sitting on top of a raised platform with a bass shaker. This allows for vibrations that simulate the experience of riding a military vehicle. Other accessories such as joysticks or mock machine guns are given to the patients, if appropriate, to enhance realism.

The clinician introduces triggers, such as gunfire, explosions, etc. into the virtual environment as they see fit. The clinician can also adapt sound and lighting conditions to match the patient's description. The researchers who developed the BRAVEMIND system reported that in a 20-patient trial, the patients' scores on the diagnostic PTSD checklist–military version (PCL-M) dropped from 54.4 pre-treatment to 35.6 post-treatment after eleven sessions. In another clinical trial, consisting of 24 active-duty soldiers, it was reported that after 7 sessions 45% no longer were identified as positive for PTSD while 62% demonstrated symptomatic improvement. These experimental results were compared with those of alternative PE treatments.

The BRAVEMIND software has 14 different environments available including military barracks, Iraqi markets, and desert roads. Included in these are environments specific to military sexual trauma (MST). Designed environments such as U.S. base settings, shower areas, latrines, remote shelters, and others were developed after consulting subject matter experts from Emory University.

Proponents of this research have said that with military based videogames being so prevalent, this technology may be more appealing to patients and reduce the stigma surrounding treatment. They also have argued that as research on PTSD unfolds, possible subtypes may respond to treatments differently, and therefore diversifying treatment options is best. Others have expressed reservations about the capacity to properly personalize VRET for individualized treatment and the use of ethnic stereotyping while developing Arab populated environments.

=== Commercial development and providers ===
A number of clinical and commercial groups have developed virtual reality systems for therapeutic use.

==== AppliedVR (United States) ====
AppliedVR develops skills-based VR programs for pain management. In November 2021, the U.S. Food and Drug Administration granted a De Novo classification establishing a Class II category (virtual reality behavioral therapy device for pain relief) for the company's at-home program for chronic lower back pain. In April 2023, the U.S. Centers for Medicare & Medicaid Services created HCPCS code E1905 for a virtual reality cognitive behavioral therapy device, describing RelieVRx as durable medical equipment. Randomized, sham-controlled trials have reported clinically meaningful reductions in pain intensity and interference that were maintained at 12 months post-treatment. Earlier double-blind randomized work during the COVID-19 period also found benefits over an active control.

==== BehaVR and Oxford VR (United States / United Kingdom) ====
In December 2022, BehaVR announced a merger with the University of Oxford spin-out Oxford VR and a concurrent funding round to advance VR-based digital therapeutics for mental health. Prior to the merger, Oxford VR published randomized controlled trials of automated, coach-guided VR cognitive therapy, including a Lancet Psychiatry trial for acrophobia showing large reductions in fear compared with usual care, and the multi-site gameChange trial in people with psychosis, which reduced agoraphobic avoidance and distress and reported favorable health-economic modeling for the UK NHS.

==== Floreo (United States) ====
Floreo develops VR lessons for autistic individuals to practice joint attention and social communication skills. It has been profiled by the U.S. National Institute of Mental Health's SBIR/STTR program, which notes academic research partnerships. A pilot study reported feasibility and good tolerability of Floreo's joint-attention module in school-aged children with autism, with preliminary improvement on joint-attention measures; further controlled trials were planned.

==== PsyTechVR (United States / Luxembourg) ====
PsyTechVR develops virtual-reality software used for clinician-guided exposure therapy. In addition to a library of prebuilt environments for specific phobias, the platform includes a tool that uses generative AI to create custom exposure scenarios for therapists to use in sessions. In university settings, the software has been demonstrated and used for student testing of VR exposure modules, with accompanying questionnaires and supportive environments such as meditation and art-therapy rooms. A seminar report also notes clinician-facing tools for creating custom environments and monitoring sessions during VR-based exposure and desensitisation work.

==== Rehametrics (Spain) ====
Rehametrics, founded in 2017, develops digital rehabilitation platforms using both immersive virtual reality and non-immersive motion-tracking systems. Designed for clinical settings and telerehabilitation, the software is a CE-marked medical device focused on the physical and cognitive recovery of patients with acquired brain injury, neurodegenerative diseases, spinal cord injuries, and other physical impairments. The platform gamifies clinical tasks and automatically collects objective performance data—such as reaction times and range of motion—allowing healthcare professionals to adjust difficulty and track patient progress over time. Its efficacy in improving motor function, balance, and cognitive outcomes in neurorehabilitation has been validated across multiple clinical trials and systematic reviews.

==== Smileyscope (Australia) ====
Smileyscope is a medical technology company that develops virtual reality (VR) systems intended to reduce pain and anxiety during medical procedures. It was founded in 2019 by Melbourne doctors Evelyn Chan and Paul Leong. The platform uses a medical-grade VR headset alongside procedures such as venipuncture, intravenous cannulation, burns care, medical imaging and emergency care. The company also makes Lume for women's health procedures. In two 2019 randomized trials, children aged 4 to 11 reported up to 60% less pain and up to 40% less anxiety during needle procedures than with standard care. The clinical reference UpToDate describes VR as a nonpharmacological option that may avoid the need for procedural sedation in children, citing the 2019 trials. In 2023 the U.S. Food and Drug Administration cleared it to reduce pain and anxiety in children during needle procedures. It is used in hospitals and clinics in Australia, the United States, the United Kingdom, Ireland, New Zealand and the United Arab Emirates.

==== Virtually Better (United States) ====
Founded in 1996, Virtually Better, Inc. collaborated with academic groups in early virtual-reality exposure therapy (VRET) research for specific phobias and related anxiety disorders. Controlled trials by Rothbaum and colleagues in the late 1990s and early 2000s found VRET comparable to in-vivo exposure for fear of flying, with maintenance at follow-up; these studies helped establish VRET as a clinically investigated modality.

==== XRHealth and Amelia Virtual Care (formerly Psious) (Israel / United States / Spain) ====
XRHealth operates virtual clinics using VR/AR for physical, occupational and mental health care. In 2023, XRHealth announced a merger with Amelia Virtual Care (formerly Psious), consolidating mental-health VR content and clinical delivery; in 2024 it raised funding to support the combined platform and expand at-home treatment models. Psious/Amelia is described as a platform emphasizing mental health exposure-based modules used by clinicians. XRHealth has recently acquired InnerWorld which is a mental health VR platform which also is available on smart phones and computers as an app.

== Treatment for lesions ==
Virtual reality therapy has two promising potential benefits for treatment of hemispatial neglect patients. These include improvement of diagnostic techniques and as a supplement to rehabilitation techniques.

Current diagnostic techniques usually involve pen and paper tests like the line bisection test. Though these tests have provided relatively accurate diagnostic results, advances in virtual reality therapy (VRT) have proven these tests to not be completely thorough. Dvorkin et al. used a camera system that immersed the patient into a virtual reality world and required the patient to grasp or move object in the world, through tracking of arm and hand movements. These techniques revealed that pen and paper tests provide relatively accurate qualitative diagnoses of hemispatial neglect patients, but VRT provided accurate mapping into a 3-dimensional space, revealing areas of space that were thought to be neglected but which patients had at least some awareness. Patients were also retested 10 months from initial measurements, during which each went through regular rehabilitation therapy, and most showed measurably less neglect on virtual reality testing whereas no measurable improvements were shown in the line bisection test.

Virtual reality therapy has also proven to be effective in rehabilitation of lesion patients with neglect. A study was conducted with 24 individuals with hemispatial neglect. A control group of 12 individuals underwent conventional rehabilitation therapy including visual scanning training, while the virtual reality group (VR) were immersed in 3 virtual worlds, each with a specific task. The programs consisted of

1. "Bird and Ball" in which a patient touches a flying ball with his or her hand and turns it into a bird
2. "Coconut", in which a patient catches a coconut falling from a tree while moving around
3. "Container" in which a patient moves a box carried in a container to the opposite side.

Each of the patients of VR went through 3 weeks of 5-day-a-week 30-minute intervals emerged in these programs. The controls went through the equivalent time in traditional rehabilitation therapies. Each patient took the star cancellation test, line bisection test, and Catherine Bergego Scale (CBS) 24 hours before and after the three-week treatment to assess the severity of unilateral spatial neglect. The VR group showed a higher increase in the star cancellation test and CBS scores after treatment than the control group (p<0.05), but both groups did not show any difference in the line bisection test and K-MBI before and after treatment. These results suggest that virtual reality programs can be more effective than conventional rehabilitation and thus should be further researched.

== VR advantages over IVE ==
The preference of virtual reality exposure therapy over in-vivo exposure therapy is often debated, but there are many obvious advantages of virtual reality exposure therapy that make it more desirable. For example, the proximity between the client and therapist can cause problems when in-vivo therapy is used and transportation is not reliable for the client or it is impractical for them to travel as far as needed. However, virtual reality exposure therapy can be done from anywhere in the world if given the necessary tools. Going along with the idea of unavailable transportation and proximity, there are many individuals who require therapy but due to various forms of immobilizations (paralysis, extreme obesity, etc.) they can not physically be moved to where the therapy is conducted. Again, because virtual reality exposure therapy can be conducted anywhere in the world, those with mobility issues will no longer be discriminated against. Another major advantage is fewer ethical concerns than in-vivo exposure therapy.

Another advantage to virtual reality rehab over the traditional method is patient motivation. When presented with difficult tasks during a prolonged period, patients tend to lose interest in these tasks. This causes a decrease in compliance due to decreased motivation of completing a given task. Virtual reality rehab is advantageous in such a way that it challenges and motivates the patient to do more. With simple things like high scores, in-game awards, and ranks, not only are patients motivated to do their daily therapies, they are having fun doing it. Not only is this advantageous to the patients, it is advantageous to the physical therapist. With these high scores, and data the game or application collects, therapists can analyze the data to see progression. This progression can be charted and visually shown to the patient for increased motivation on their performance and the progression they have made thus far in their therapies. This data can then be charted with other participants doing similar tasks and can show how they compare to people with similar therapy regimens. This charted data in the program or game can then be used by researchers and scientists alike for further evaluation of optimal therapy regimens. A recent study done in 2016 where a VR based virtual simulation of a city named Reh@City was made. This city in virtual reality evoked memory, attention, visuo-spatial abilities and executive functions tasks are integrated in the performance of several daily routines. This study looked at Activities of Daily Living in post stroke patients and found it to have more of an impact than conventional methods in the recovery process.

== Concerns ==
There are a few ethical concerns concerning the use and development of using virtual reality simulation for helping clients/patients with mental health issues. One example of these concerns is the potential side effects and aftereffects of virtual reality exposure. Some of these side effects and aftereffects could include cybersickness (a type of motion sickness caused by the virtual reality experience), perceptual-motor disturbances, flashbacks, and generally lowered arousal (Rizzo, Schultheis, & Rothbaum, 2003). If severe and widespread enough, these effects should be mitigated via various methods by those therapists using virtual reality.

Another ethical concern is how clinicians should receive VRT certification. Due to the relative newness of virtual reality as a whole, there may not be many clinicians who have experience with the nuances of virtual reality exposure or VR programs' intended roles in therapy. According to Rizzo et al. (2003), virtual reality technology should only be used as a tool for qualified clinicians instead of being used to further one's practice or garner an attraction for new clients/patients.

Some traditional concerns with virtual reality therapy is the cost. Since virtual reality in the field of science and medicine is so primitive and new, the costs of virtual reality equipment would be a lot higher than some of the traditional methods. With medical costs growing at an exponential level this would be another cost that is added to the growing list of medical bills for a patient's recovery process. Regardless of the benefits with virtual reality rehab, the costs of the equipment and the resources for a virtual reality setup would make it difficult for it to be mainstream and available to all patients including the indigent population. However, a new market of lower cost virtual reality hardware is emerging, specifically with improved head-mounted displays.

In addition there are some issues which are related to virtual reality that can arise from its use such as social isolation where the users can become detached from real-world social connections and the overestimation of a person's abilities where users – especially the young – often fail to distinguish between their feats in real life and virtual reality.
