= Transport tetany =

Medical condition in cattle

Transport tetany is a disease that occurs in cows and ewes after the stress of prolonged transport in crowded, hot and poorly ventilated vehicles. It is commonly seen in animals in late pregnancy and those transported to slaughter. The disease is generally fatal, even with treatment, unless detected early. It is also known as transit tetany, railroad disease, railroad sickness, or staggers.

Early clinical signs include restlessness, excitement, trismus, grinding of teeth, staggering gait and later paddling of hind legs. Rumen hypomotility, gastrointestinal stasis and anorexia develop. Also may develop tachycardia and rapid, labored respiration. If not recovered, the animal dies, often after a coma.

It may also happen in horses.
