= Phobia =

Anxiety disorder classified by a persistent and excessive fear of an object or situation

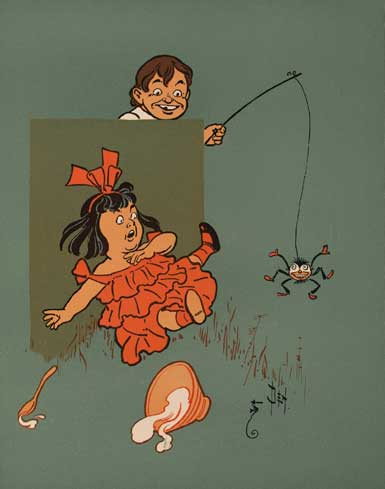
- The fear of spiders is one of the most common phobias.
- Specialty: Psychiatry, clinical psychology
- Symptoms: Fear of an object or situation
- Complications: Suicide, high risk of comorbidities
- Usual onset: Rapid
- Duration: More than six months
- Types: Specific phobias, social anxiety disorder, agoraphobia
- Causes: Genetic and environmental factors
- Treatment: Exposure therapy, counselling, medication
- Medication: Antidepressants, benzodiazepines, beta-blockers
- Frequency: Specific phobias: ~5% Social phobia: ~5% Agoraphobia: ~2%

A phobia is an anxiety disorder, defined by an irrational, unrealistic, persistent and excessive fear of an object or situation. Phobias typically result in a rapid onset of fear and are usually present for more than six months. Those affected go to great lengths to avoid the situation or object, to a degree greater than the actual danger posed. If the object or situation cannot be avoided, they experience significant distress. Other symptoms can include fainting, which may occur in blood or injury phobia, and panic attacks, often found in agoraphobia and emetophobia. Around 75% of those with phobias have multiple phobias.

Phobias can be divided into specific phobias, social anxiety disorder, and agoraphobia. Specific phobias are further divided to include certain animals, natural environment, blood or injury, and particular situations. The most common are fear of spiders, fear of cockroaches, fear of snakes, and fear of heights. Specific phobias may be caused by a negative experience with the object or situation in early childhood to early adulthood. Social phobia is when a person fears a situation due to worries about others judging them. Agoraphobia is a fear of a situation due to perceived difficulty or inability to escape.

It is recommended that specific phobias be treated with exposure therapy, in which the person is introduced to the situation or object in question until the fear resolves. Medications are not helpful for specific phobias. Social phobia and agoraphobia may be treated with counseling, medications, or a combination of both. Medications used include antidepressants, benzodiazepines, or beta-blockers.

Specific phobias affect about 6–8% of people in the Western world and 2–4% in Asia, Africa, and Latin America in a given year. Social phobia affects about 7% of people in the United States and 0.5–2.5% of people in the rest of the world. Agoraphobia affects about 1.7% of people. Women are affected by phobias about twice as often as men. The typical onset of a phobia is around 10–17 years, and rates are lower with increasing age. Those with phobias are more likely to attempt suicide.

== Classification ==
Fear is an emotional response to a current perceived danger. This differs from anxiety which is a response in preparation of a future threat. Fear and anxiety often can overlap but this distinction can help identify subtle differences between disorders, as well as differentiate between a response that would be expected given a person's developmental stage and culture.

=== ICD-11 ===
The International Classification of Diseases (11th version: ICD-11) is a globally used diagnostic tool for epidemiology, health management and clinical purposes maintained by the World Health Organization (WHO). The ICD classifies phobic disorders under the category of mental, behavioural or neurodevelopmental disorders. The ICD-10 differentiates between Phobic anxiety disorders, such as Agoraphobia, and Other anxiety disorders, such as Generalized anxiety disorder. The ICD-11 merges both groups together as Anxiety or fear-related disorders.

=== DSM-5 ===
Most phobias are classified into 3 categories. According to the Diagnostic and Statistical Manual of Mental Disorders, Fifth Edition (DSM-5), such phobias are considered subtypes of anxiety disorder. The categories are:

1. Specific phobias: Fear of particular objects or situations that results in anxiety and avoidance. May lead to panic attacks if exposed to feared stimulus or in anticipation of encounter. A specific phobia may be further subdivided into five categories: animal, natural environment, situational, blood-injection-injury, and other.
2. Agoraphobia: a generalized fear of leaving home or a small familiar 'safe' area and of possible panic attacks that might follow. Various specific phobias may also cause it, such as fear of open spaces, social embarrassment (social agoraphobia), fear of contamination (fear of germs, possibly complicated by obsessive–compulsive disorder) or post-traumatic stress disorder (PTSD) related to a trauma that occurred outdoors.
3. Social anxiety disorder (SAD), also known as social phobia, is when the situation is feared out of a worrying about others judging them. Performance only is a subtype of social anxiety disorder

Phobias vary in severity among individuals. Some individuals can avoid the subject and experience relatively mild anxiety over that fear. Others experience full-fledged panic attacks with all the associated impairing symptoms. Most individuals understand that their fear is irrational but cannot override their panic response. These individuals often report dizziness, loss of bladder or bowel control, tachypnea, feelings of pain, and shortness of breath.

== Causes ==
Phobias may develop for a variety of reasons. Childhood experiences, past traumatic experiences, brain chemistry, genetics, or learned behavior, can all be reasons why phobias develop. There are even phobias that may run in families and be passed down from one generation to another.

There are multiple theories about how phobias develop and likely occur due to a combination of environmental and genetic factors. The degree to whether environment or genetic influences have a more significant role varies by condition, with social anxiety disorder and agoraphobia having around a 50% heritability rate.

=== Environmental ===
Stanley Rachman proposed three pathways for the development of phobias: direct or classical conditioning (exposure to phobic stimulus), vicarious acquisition (seeing others experience phobic stimulus), and informational/instructional acquisition (learning about phobic stimulus from others).

==== Classical conditioning ====
Much of the progress in understanding the acquisition of fear responses in phobias can be attributed to classical conditioning (Pavlovian model). When an aversive stimulus and a neutral one are paired together, for instance, when an electric shock is given in a specific room, the subject can start to fear not only the shock but the room as well. In behavioral terms, the room is a conditioned stimulus (CS). When paired with an aversive unconditioned stimulus (UCS) (the shock), it creates a conditioned response (CR) (fear for the room) (CS+UCS=CR). For example, in case of the fear of heights (acrophobia), the CS is heights. Such as a balcony on the top floors of a high rise building. The UCS can originate from an aversive or traumatizing event in the person's life, such as almost falling from a great height. The original fear of nearly falling is associated with being high, leading to a fear of heights. In other words, the CS (heights) associated with the aversive UCS (almost falling) leads to the CR (fear). It is possible, however, to extinguish the CR, and reversing the effects of the CS and UCS. Repeatedly presenting the CS alone, without the UCS, can exinguish the CR.

Though historically influential in the theory of fear acquisition, this direct conditioning model is not the only proposed way to acquire a phobia. This theory in fact has limitations as not everyone that has experienced a traumatic event develops a phobia and vice versa.

==== Vicarious conditioning ====
Vicarious fear acquisition is learning to fear something, not by a subject's own experience of fear, but by watching others, oftentimes a parent (observational learning). For instance, when a child sees a parent reacting fearfully to an animal, the child can also become afraid of the animal. Through observational learning, humans can learn to fear potentially dangerous objects—a reaction observed in other primates. A study on non-human primates, showed that the primates learned to fear snakes at a fast rate after watching parents' fearful reactions. An increase in fearful behaviours was observed as the non-human primates observed their parents' fearful reactions. Although observational learning has proven effective in creating reactions of fear and phobias, it has also been shown that by physically experiencing an event, increases the chance of fearful and phobic behaviours. In some cases, physically experiencing an event may increase the fear and phobia more than observing a fearful reaction of another human or non-human primate.

==== Informational/Instructional acquisition ====
Informational/instructional fear acquisition is learning to fear something by getting information. For instance, fearing electrical wire after hearing that touching it causes an electric shock.

A conditioned fear response to an object or situation is not always a phobia. There must also be symptoms of impairment and avoidance. Impairment is defined as an inability to complete routine tasks, whether occupational, academic, or social. For example, an occupational impairment can result from acrophobia, from not taking a job solely because of its location on the top floor of a building, or socially not participating in an event at a theme park. The avoidance aspect is defined as behaviour that results in the omission of an aversive event that would otherwise occur, intending to prevent anxiety.

=== Genetic ===
With the completion of the Human Genome Project in 2003, much research has been completed looking at specific genes that may cause or contribute to medical conditions. Candidate genes were the focus of most of these studies until the past decade, when the cost and ability to perform genome-wide analyses became more available. The GLRB gene was identified as a possible target for agoraphobia. An area still in development is reviewing epigenetic components or the interaction of the environment on genes through methylation. A number of genes are being examined through this epigenetic lens which may be linked with social anxiety disorder, including MAOA, CRHR1, and OXTR. Each phobia related disorder has some degree of genetic susceptibility. Those with specific phobias are more likely to have first degree relatives with the same specific phobia. Similarly, social anxiety disorder is found two to six times more frequently in those with first degree relatives that have it versus those that do not. Agoraphobia is believed to have the strongest genetic association.

== Mechanism ==
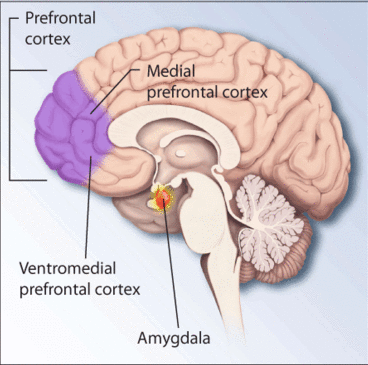
Regions of the brain associated with phobias

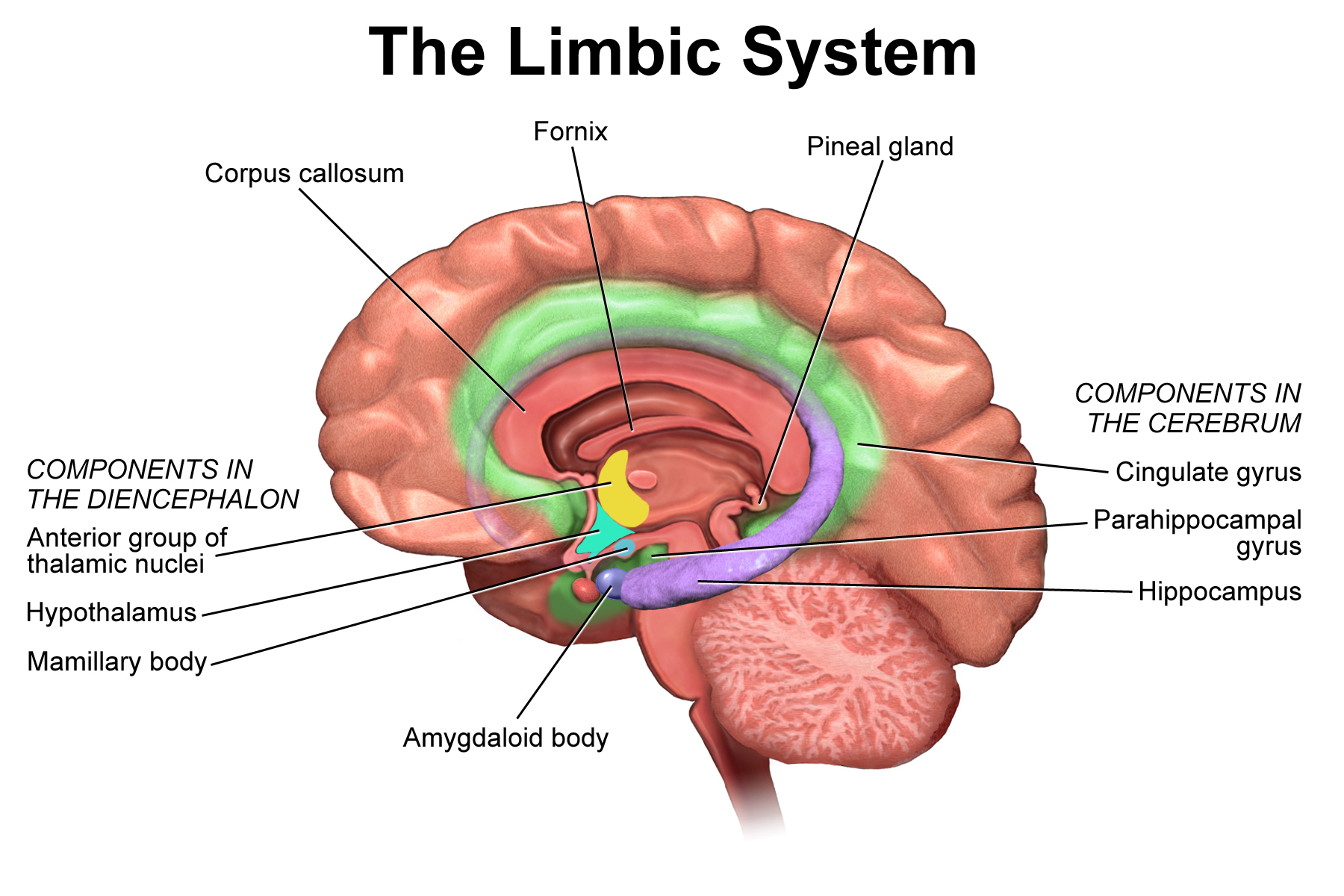
Anatomical components of the limbic system

=== Limbic system ===
Beneath the lateral fissure in the cerebral cortex, the insula, or insular cortex, of the brain has been identified as part of the limbic system, along with the cingulated gyrus, hippocampus, corpus callosum, and other nearby cortices. This system has been found to play a role in emotion processing, and the insula, in particular, may contribute to maintaining autonomic functions. Studies by Critchley et al. indicate the insula as being involved in the experience of emotion by detecting and interpreting threatening stimuli. Similar studies monitoring insula activity have shown a correlation between increased insular activation and anxiety.

In the frontal lobes, other cortices involved with phobia and fear are the anterior cingulate cortex and the medial prefrontal cortex. In the processing of emotional stimuli, studies on phobic reactions to facial expressions have indicated that these areas are involved in the processing and responding to negative stimuli. The ventromedial prefrontal cortex has been said to influence the amygdala by monitoring its reaction to emotional stimuli or even fearful memories. Most specifically, the medial prefrontal cortex is active during the extinction of fear and is responsible for long-term extinction. Stimulation of this area decreases conditioned fear responses, so its role may be in inhibiting the amygdala and its reaction to fearful stimuli.

The hippocampus is a horseshoe-shaped structure that plays an essential part in the brain's limbic system. This is because it forms memories and connects them with emotions and the senses. When dealing with fear, the hippocampus receives impulses from the amygdala that allow it to connect the fear with a certain sense, such as a smell or sound.

==== Amygdala ====
The amygdala is an almond-shaped mass of nuclei located deep in the brain's medial temporal lobe. It processes the events associated with fear and is linked to social phobia and other anxiety disorders. The amygdala's ability to respond to fearful stimuli occurs through fear conditioning. Like classical conditioning, the amygdala learns to associate a conditioned stimulus with a negative or avoidant stimulus, creating a conditioned fear response often seen in phobic individuals. The amygdala is responsible for recognizing certain stimuli or cues as dangerous and plays a role in the storage of threatening stimuli to memory. The basolateral nuclei (or basolateral amygdala) and the hippocampus interact with the amygdala in-memory storage. This connection suggests why memories are often remembered more vividly if they have emotional significance.

In addition to memory, the amygdala also triggers the secretion of hormones that affect fear and aggression. When the fear or aggression response is initiated, the amygdala releases hormones into the body to put the human body into an "alert" state, which prepares the individual to move, run, fight, etc. This defensive "alert" state and response are known as the fight-or-flight response.

However, inside the brain, this stress response can be observed in the hypothalamic-pituitary-adrenal axis (HPA). This circuit incorporates the process of receiving stimuli, interpreting them, and releasing certain hormones into the bloodstream. The parvocellular neurosecretory neurons of the hypothalamus release corticotropin-releasing hormone (CRH), which is sent to the anterior pituitary. Here the pituitary releases adrenocorticotropic hormone (ACTH), which ultimately stimulates the release of cortisol. In relation to anxiety, the amygdala activates this circuit, while the hippocampus is responsible for suppressing it. Glucocorticoid receptors in the hippocampus monitor the amount of cortisol in the system and through negative feedback can tell the hypothalamus to stop releasing CRH.

Studies on mice engineered to have high concentrations of CRH showed higher levels of anxiety, while those engineered to have no or low amounts of CRH receptors were less anxious. In people with phobias, therefore, high amounts of cortisol may be present, or there may be low levels of glucocorticoid receptors or even serotonin (5-HT).

===== Disruption by damage =====
For the areas in the brain involved in emotion – most specifically, fear – the processing and response to emotional stimuli can be altered when there are damage to any of these regions. Damage to the cortical areas involved in the limbic system, such as the cingulate cortex or frontal lobes, has resulted in extreme emotion changes. Other types of damage include Klüver–Bucy syndrome and Urbach–Wiethe disease. In Klüver–Bucy syndrome, a temporal lobectomy, or removal of the temporal lobes, results in changes involving fear and aggression. Specifically, the removal of these lobes results in decreased fear, confirming its role in fear recognition and response. Damage to both side (Bilateral damage) of the medial temporal lobes is known as Urbach–Wiethe disease. It presents with similar symptoms of decreased fear and aggression but with the addition of the inability to recognize emotional expressions, especially angry or fearful faces.

The amygdala's role in learned fear includes interactions with other brain regions in the neural circuit of fear. While damage in the amygdala can inhibit its ability to recognize fearful stimuli, other areas such as the ventromedial prefrontal cortex and the basolateral nuclei of the amygdala can affect the region's ability to not only become conditioned to fearful stimuli but to extinguish them eventually. Through receiving stimulus info, the basolateral nuclei undergo synaptic changes that allow the amygdala to develop a conditioned response to fearful stimuli. Damage to this area, therefore, have been shown to disrupt the acquisition of learned responses to fear. Likewise, damage in the ventromedial prefrontal cortex (the area responsible for monitoring the amygdala) has been shown to slow down the speed of extinguishing a learned fear response and how effective the extinction is. This suggests there is a pathway or circuit among the amygdala and nearby cortical areas that process emotional stimuli and influence emotional expression, all of which can be disrupted when damage occurs.

== Diagnosis ==
It is recommended that the terms distress and impairment take into account the context of the person's environment during diagnosis. The DSM-IV-TR states that if a feared stimulus, whether it be an object or a situation, is absent entirely in an environment, a diagnosis cannot be made. An example of this situation would be an individual who has a fear of mice but lives in an area without mice. Even though the concept of mice causes marked distress and impairment within the individual, because the individual does not usually encounter mice, no actual distress or impairment is ever experienced. It is recommended that proximity to, and ability to escape from, the stimulus also be considered. As the phobic person approaches a feared stimulus, anxiety levels increase, and the degree to which the person perceives they might escape from the stimulus affects the intensity of fear in instances such as riding an elevator (e.g. anxiety increases at the midway point between floors and decreases when the floor is reached and the doors open). The DSM-V has been updated to reflect that an individual may have changed their daily activities around the feared stimulus in such a way that they may avoid it altogether. The person may still meet criteria for the diagnosis if they continue to avoid or refuse to participate in activities they would involve possible exposure to the phobic stimulus.

	Specific phobia	Social anxiety disorder	Agoraphobia
Features	Fear out of proportion to the danger presented by an object or situation	Anxiety of social encounters due to potential scrutiny from others	Fear of leaving a protective place or situations viewed as being unable to escape from
Duration	≥ 6 months	≥ 6 months	≥ 6 months

=== Specific phobias ===
A specific phobia is a marked and persistent fear of an object or situation. Specific phobias may also include fear of losing control, panicking, and fainting from an encounter with the phobia. Specific phobias are defined concerning objects or situations, whereas social phobias emphasize social fear and the evaluations that might accompany them.

The DSM breaks specific phobias into five subtypes: animal, natural environment, blood-injection-injury, situational and other. In children, blood-injection-injury phobia, animal phobias, and natural environment phobias usually develop between the ages of 7 and 9 reflective of normal development. Additionally, specific phobias are most prevalent in children between the ages 10 and 13. Situational phobias are typically found in older children and adults.

== Treatments ==
There are various methods used to treat phobias. These methods include systematic desensitization, progressive relaxation, virtual reality, modeling, medication, and hypnotherapy. Over the past several decades, psychologists and other researchers have developed effective behavioral, pharmacological, and technological interventions for the treatment of phobia.

Virtual Reality treatments produce similar effects to in vivo exposure, another efficacious therapy that is considered to be great for treating phobias. Although Virtual Reality is seen as a good treatment, the treatment will not work for every phobia. The treatment has positive effects, but depending on the phobia, in vivo would be another ideal treatment to use over Virtual Reality. In vivo exposure is seen as a great way to reduce fear over time and is actually more preferred when trying to treat anxiety and fear related problems.

=== Therapy ===
Cognitive behavioral therapy (CBT) is an evidence-based treatment that can help with phobias. It is a talk therapy that can be used alone or along with other therapies. CBT is there to help manage stressful situations and respond better. This therapy requires the person to be honest with themselves and confront their feelings and phobias.

Cognitive Behavioral Therapy can be beneficial by allowing the person to challenge dysfunctional thoughts or beliefs by being mindful of their feelings to recognize that their fear is irrational. CBT may occur in a group setting. Gradual desensitization treatment and CBT are often successful, provided the person is willing to endure some discomfort. In one clinical trial, 90% of people no longer had a phobic reaction after successful CBT treatment. Research in the UK has suggested that for childhood phobias a single session of CBT can be effective.

Evidence supports that eye movement desensitization and reprocessing (EMDR) is effective in treating some phobias. Its effectiveness in treating complex or trauma-related phobias has not been empirically established. Primarily used to treat post-traumatic stress disorder, EMDR has been demonstrated to ease phobia symptoms following a specific trauma, such as a fear of dogs following a dog bite.

=== Systematic desensitization ===
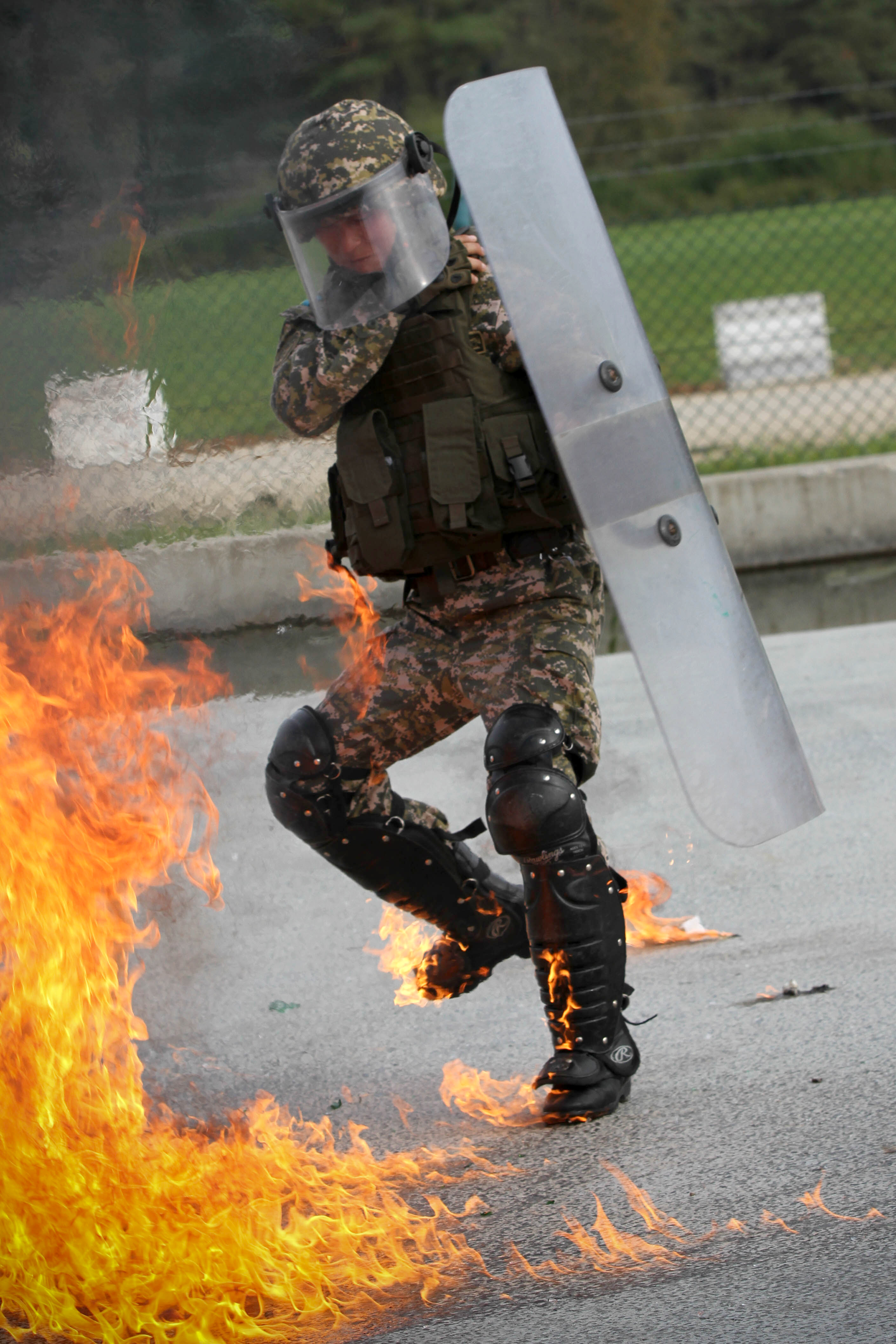
A soldier stomping his foot to put out the fire rising up his leg during military fire-phobia training

Systematic desensitization is a process in which people seeking help slowly become accustomed to their phobia, and ultimately overcome it. Traditional systematic desensitization involves a person being exposed to the object they are afraid of over time so that the fear and discomfort do not become overwhelming. This controlled exposure to the anxiety-provoking stimulus is key to the effectiveness of exposure therapy in the treatment of specific phobias. It has been shown that humor is an excellent alternative when traditional systematic desensitization is ineffective. Humor systematic desensitization involves a series of treatment activities that elicit humor with the feared object. Previously learned progressive muscle relaxation procedures can be used as the activities become more difficult. Progressive muscle relaxation helps people relax before and during exposure to the feared stimulus.

Virtual reality therapy is another technique that helps phobic people confront a feared object. It uses virtual reality to generate scenes that may not have been possible or ethical in the physical world. It is equally as effective as traditional exposure therapy and offers additional advantages. These include controlling the scenes and having the phobic person endure more exposure than they might handle in reality.

=== Medications ===
Medications are a treatment option often utilized in combination with CBT or if CBT was not tolerated or effective. Medications can help regulate apprehension and fear of a particular fearful object or situation. There are various medication options available for both social anxiety disorder and agoraphobia. The use of medications for specific phobias, besides the limited role of benzodiazepines, do not currently have established guidelines due to minimal supporting evidence.

==== Antidepressants ====
Antidepressant medications such as selective serotonin reuptake inhibitors (SSRIs), serotonin-norepinephrine reuptake inhibitors (SNRIs), or monoamine oxidase inhibitors (MAOIs) may be helpful in some cases. SSRIs / SNRIs act on serotonin, a neurotransmitter in the brain. Because of serotonin's positive impacts on mood, an antidepressant may be offered and prescribed as a treatment option. For social anxiety, the SSRIs sertraline, paroxetine, fluvoxamine, and the SNRI venlafaxine have FDA approval. Similar medications may be offered for agoraphobia.

==== Benzodiazepines ====
Sedatives such as benzodiazepines (clonazepam, alprazolam) are another therapeutic option, which can help people relax by reducing the amount of anxiety they feel. Benzodiazepines may be useful in the acute treatment of severe symptoms, but the risk-benefit ratio usually goes against their long-term use in phobic disorders. This class of medication has recently been shown as effective if used with negative behaviours such as excessive alcohol use. Despite this positive finding, benzodiazepines are used with caution due to side effects and risk of developing dependence or withdrawal symptoms. In specific phobia for example if the phobic stimulus is one that is not regularly encountered such as flying a short course may be provided.

==== Beta-blockers ====
Beta blockers (propranolol) are another therapeutic option, particularly for those with the performance only subtype of social anxiety disorder. They may stop the stimulating effects of adrenaline, such as sweating, increased heart rate, elevated blood pressure, tremors, and the feeling of a pounding heart. By taking beta-blockers before a phobic event, these symptoms are decreased, making the event less frightening. Beta-blockers are not effective for generalized social anxiety disorder.

=== Hypnotherapy ===
Hypnotherapy is another effective therapy that uses hypnosis to help manage anxiety and stress. This therapy can help people gain control over their phobias.

Hypnotherapy can be used alone and in conjunction with systematic desensitization to treat phobias. Through hypnotherapy, the underlying cause of the phobia may be uncovered. The phobia may be caused by a past event that the person does not remember, a phenomenon known as repression. The mind represses traumatic memories from the conscious mind until the person is ready to deal with them.

Hypnotherapy may also eliminate the conditioned responses that occur during different situations. People are first placed into a hypnotic trance, an extremely relaxed state in which the unconscious can be retrieved. This state makes people more open to suggestion, which helps bring about desired change. Consciously addressing old memories helps individuals understand the event and see it less threateningly.

== Prognosis ==
Outcomes vary widely among the phobic anxiety disorders. There is a possibility that remission occurs without intervention but relapses are common. Response to treatment as well as remission and relapse rates are impacted by the severity of an individual's disorder as well as how long they have been experiencing symptoms. For example, in social anxiety disorder (social phobia) a majority of individuals will experience remission within the first couple of years of symptom onset without specific treatment. On the other hand, in Agoraphobia as few as 10% of individuals are seen to reach complete remission without treatment. A study looking at the 2 year remission rates for anxiety disorders found that those with multiple anxieties were less likely to experience remission.

=== Specific phobia ===
The majority of those that develop a specific phobia first experience symptoms in childhood. Often individuals will experience symptoms periodically with periods of remission before complete remission occurs. However, specific phobias that continue into adulthood are likely to experience a more chronic course. Specific phobias in older adults has been linked with a decrease in quality of life. Those with specific phobias are at an increased risk of suicide. Greater impairment is found in those that have multiple phobias. Response to treatment is relatively high but many do not seek treatment due to lack of access, ability to avoid phobia, or unwilling to face feared object for repeated CBT sessions.

=== Comorbidities ===
Many of those with a phobia often have more than one phobia. There are also a number of psychological and physiological disorders that tend to occur or coexist at higher rates among this population. As with all anxiety disorders the most common psychiatric condition to occur with a phobia is major depressive disorder. Additionally bipolar disorder, substance dependence disorder, obsessive-compulsive disorder, and post traumatic stress disorder have also been found to occur in those with phobias at higher rates.

== Epidemiology ==
Phobias are a common form of anxiety disorder, and distributions are heterogeneous by age and gender. An American study by the National Institute of Mental Health (NIMH) found that between 8.7 percent and 18.1 percent of Americans have phobias, making it the most common mental illness among women in all age groups and the second most common illness among men older than 25. Between 4 percent and 10 percent of all children experience specific phobias during their lives, and social phobias occur in one percent to three percent of children.

A Swedish study found that females have a higher number of cases per year than males (26.5 percent for females and 12.4 percent for males). Among adults, 21.2 percent of women and 10.9 percent of men have a single specific phobia, while multiple phobias occur in 5.4 percent of females and 1.5 percent of males. Women are nearly four times as likely as men to have a fear of animals (12.1 percent in women and 3.3 percent in men) — a higher dimorphic than with all specific or generalized phobias or social phobias. Social phobias are more common in girls than boys, while situational phobia occurs in 17.4 percent of women and 8.5 percent of men.

== History ==
In the 9th century, Islamic polymath Abu Zayd al-Balkhi (850-934) was likely the first to identify phobias accurately. In his treatise Sustenance of the Body and Soul, Al Balkhi described phobia as a psychological disorder that may manifest with physical symptoms such as paleness of the skin and trembling of the hands. Remarkably, Al-Balkhi not only recognised phobias as psychological in nature but also proposed a treatment approach that included cognitive techniques and exposure therapy. He recommended that individuals gradually expose themselves to feared stimuli and train themselves to tolerate the experience until they reach habituation, an approach that mirrors modern therapeutic techniques for treating phobias. This is an exceptional accomplishment considering that the physical symptoms of phobias were mistakenly grouped under physical rubrics in Western medical textbooks and were not believed to be associated with phobias until the 19th century.

The Western understanding of phobias as a physical condition was influenced by a combination of medical dogma and a limited understanding of psychology and mental health. This view persisted from antiquity through the Renaissance and into the 19th century, until more nuanced psychological frameworks were developed.

In the early history of Western medicine, mental and emotional disturbances, including phobias, were often viewed through a physiological lens, with causes linked to physical imbalances. Hippocrates (460–370 BCE), the father of medicine, proposed that mental health issues were caused by imbalances in the four humors (blood, phlegm, yellow bile, and black bile), and emotional conditions like fear were incorrectly seen as physical symptoms of these imbalances. Galen, a Roman physician, expanded this idea, attributing mental disturbances to bodily humors and brain function.

In the Middle Ages, medical explanations shifted to spiritual causes, with mental disorders seen as linked to demonic possession or divine punishment. Physical symptoms, like trembling or paleness, were often misattributed to fever or other bodily ailments rather than psychological distress.

By the Early Modern period (16th–17th centuries), interest in neurology grew, but mental illnesses, including phobias, were still primarily seen as physical conditions. Treatments like bloodletting or purging were common, reflecting the belief that emotional symptoms stemmed from bodily imbalances rather than psychological processes.

The 19th century marked a shift as psychological models began to re-emerge. Jean-Martin Charcot and Sigmund Freud explored the mental roots of phobias, though Freud still linked them to unconscious conflicts. The emergence of behavioural psychology, particularly John B. Watson's work on conditioned fear responses, began to highlight the psychological basis of phobias. However, theories by Charcot, Freud and Watson were still not as robust as Al-Balkhi's theory of phobias proposed almost a millennia earlier.

By the 20th century, the understanding of phobias in the West evolved integrating emotional, cognitive, and biological components, largely aligning with Al-Balkhi's holistic view of phobias as a psychological disorder.

== Society and culture ==
=== Terminology ===
The word phobia comes from the Greek: φόβος (phóbos), meaning "fear" or "morbid fear". The regular system for naming specific phobias uses prefixes based on a Greek word for the object of the fear, plus the suffix -phobia. Benjamin Rush's 1786 satirical text, 'On the different Species of Phobia', established the term's dictionary sense of specific morbid fears. However, many phobias are irregularly named with Latin prefixes, such as apiphobia instead of melissaphobia (fear of bees) or aviphobia instead of ornithophobia (fear of birds). Creating these terms is something of a word game. Such fears are psychological rather than physiological in origin, and few of these terms are found in medical literature. In ancient Greek mythology Phobos was the twin brother of Deimos (terror).

The word phobia may also refer to conditions other than true phobias. For example, the term hydrophobia is an old name for rabies, since an aversion to water is one of that disease's symptoms. A specific phobia to water is called aquaphobia instead. A hydrophobe is a chemical compound that repels water. Similarly, photophobia usually refers to a physical complaint (aversion to light due to inflamed eyes or excessively dilated pupils), rather than an irrational fear of light.

=== Non-medical, deterrent and political use ===
Several terms with the suffix -phobia are used non-clinically to imply irrational fear or hatred. Examples include:

- Chemophobia – Irrational fear or hatred of chemistry and synthetic chemicals
- Technophobia – Irrational fear of or discomfort with electronics
- Xenophobia – Irrational fear or hatred of foreigners, strangers or the unknown, sometimes used to describe anti-immigration nationalistic political beliefs and movements
- Oikophobia – Irrational fear or hatred of one's home, home country, or home culture
- Homophobia – Irrational fear or hatred of homosexuality or people who identify or perceived as being lesbian, gay, bisexual or transgender (LGBT)
- Islamophobia – Irrational fear or hatred of Islam
- Hinduphobia – Irrational fear or hatred for Hindus or Hinduism
- Indophobia – Irrational fear or hatred of Indian people
- Sinophobia – Irrational fear or hatred of Chinese people
- Biphobia – Irrational fear or hatred of bisexual people
- Transphobia – Irrational fear or hatred of transgender or non-binary people
- Christophobia – Irrational fear or hatred of Christianity or Jesus Christ
- Judeophobia – Irrational fear or hatred of Jews
- Europhobia – Irrational fear or hatred of Europe, the culture, or peoples of Europe
- Latinophobia – Irrational fear or hatred of Latin Americans
- Romanophobia – Irrational fear or hatred of Romanians
- Russophobia – Irrational fear or hatred of Russians

Usually, these kinds of "phobias" are described as fear, dislike, disapproval, prejudice, hatred, discrimination, or hostility towards the object of the "phobia". It is a form of hyperbole.

== Research directions ==
Before the development of pharmacotherapy, the treatment of phobias and mental health disorders relied solely on therapy such as CBT. Although therapy can be incredibly effective for many, it does not always achieve the desired effect. Interventional psychiatry is an additional branch in medicine that has expanded treatment options, and further research continues to explore effectiveness and applications. Electroconvulsive therapy (ECT) and transcranial magnetic stimulation (TMS) are two examples of device-based interventions widely utilized. In terms of use in treating phobias and anxiety disorders as a whole, TMS is being explored as an augmentation option for those who do not have the desired response to other therapeutic options or side effects from medications. A majority of research has been conducted exploring the use of TMS in PTSD and generalized anxiety disorder. A meta‐analysis conducted in 2019 found only two clinical trials for the use of TMS in specific phobias, one of which explored anxiety and avoidance rates in individuals with acrophobia. Although the study found decreased rates in both anxiety and avoidance after two TMS sessions because of the limited number of studies and small sample size, few conclusions can be made. D-cycloserine (DCS), a partial N-methyl-D-aspartate agonist, is an additional investigational approach to augmentation specific phobias that a meta-analysis suggested had better outcomes and less symptom severity when utilized before initiating CBT.
