= Nina Vasan =

American psychiatrist

Dr. Nina Vasan

Personal details
- Born: Nina Vasan Washington, D.C., U.S.
- Education: Harvard University; Harvard Medical School; Stanford Graduate School of Business
- Website: http://www.ninavasan.com

Nina Vasan is an American psychiatrist and author of the book Do Good Well: Your Guide to Leadership, Action and Innovation. She is a Clinical Assistant Professor in the Department of Psychiatry and Behavioral Sciences at Stanford University School of Medicine. She is currently the Founder and Executive Director of Brainstorm: The Stanford Lab for Mental Health Innovation at Stanford University. She won the 2002 Intel International Science and Engineering Fair.

== Early years ==
Vasan was born in Washington, DC, spent her childhood in Vienna, West Virginia, and attended Parkersburg High School. At age 16, she started a local group in Wood County to engage teenagers in the American Cancer Society that grew into a nationwide network of teen volunteers leading efforts in education, advocacy, and service. For this work, Vasan was honored as Prudential Spirit of Community Awards National Honoree, an Olympic torchbearer, and a USA Today All-USA Academic First Team member.

Vasan was active in the Girl Scouts since age 7 and received the highest honor in Girl Scouting, the Gold Award Young Woman of Distinction, from Justice Sandra Day O'Connor in 2002. She also participated in the America's Junior Miss pageant as West Virginia's Junior Miss.

In 2002, Vasan won the $50,000 Intel Foundation Young Scientist award, the top Grand Prize award at the Intel International Science and Engineering Fair, for her work with Harvard Medical School professor Jeremy Wolfe on visual learning, which she conducted at the Research Science Institute. She also received the Seaborg (now Dudley Herschbach) SIYSS Award, which led to her presenting her research during the 2002 Nobel Prize ceremonies in Stockholm.

== Education ==
Vasan entered Harvard College and graduated with an A.B. in Government in 2006. She was named one of the "Top 10 College Women" in the US by Glamour Magazine. She earned an M.D. from Harvard Medical School and was voted by classmates as a student commencement speaker. She completed her residency training at Stanford University School of Medicine, where she was a Chief Resident in Psychiatry. While in residency, she completed an MBA at the Stanford Graduate School of Business.

== Career ==
During the 2008 Presidential Election, Vasan served as a Co-Leader of Battleground State Outreach for the Obama presidential campaign's Health Policy Advisory Committee.

After graduating from Harvard Medical School in 2013, she entered residency training in Psychiatry at Stanford University Hospital in Stanford, California. In 2015, Vasan launched The Psychiatry Innovation Lab at the Annual Meeting of the American Psychiatric Association, the world's largest psychiatric organization. The PIL is an incubator that catalyzes the formation of innovative ventures to transform mental healthcare. MedTech Boston named her a "40 Under 40 Healthcare Innovator" in 2016.

In 2016, she launched Brainstorm: The Stanford Lab for Mental Health Innovation, the world's first academic laboratory dedicated to transforming mental health through technology and entrepreneurship. She started the first college course on mental health entrepreneurship and the first virtual reality and augmented reality innovation lab for brain and behavioral health. In 2017, Vasan was named to the shortlist for the Financial Times and McKinsey Bracken Bower Prize, awarded to the best business book proposal by an author aged under 35.

In 2019, Vasan and Brainstorm colleagues worked with Pinterest to launch a "Compassionate Search" feature. The new tool provides evidence-based mental health and stress relief tools to users searching for topics like "anxiety" and "stress". Compassionate Search is designed to make mental health tools more accessible to users with difficulty accessing mental health services, while changing the experience of how mental health is addressed online towards a more open and honest experience free from stigma. They also addressed issues of suicide, safety, and self-harm that led to changes in the Pinterest platform, including creating a set of exercises for improving user's emotional outcomes, as well as AI, which Pinterest said achieved an 88% reduction in reports of self-harm content by users and ability to remove such content 3 times faster. This work was named by Fast Company as one of the Best Designs for Social Good and Most Innovative Wellness Projects of 2020.

== AI Safety Research ==
In 2025, Vasan and researchers at the Brainstorm lab contributed to research conducted with Common Sense Media examining the risks posed by AI companion chatbots to young people. The research involved testing companion platforms including Character.AI, Nomi, and Replika, and found that the systems could generate content involving self-harm, sex, violence, and drug use and did not consistently recognise signs of distress in users.

In November 2025, a separate assessment examined the responses of general-purpose chatbots, including ChatGPT, Claude, Gemini, and Meta AI, to questions relating to teenagers' mental health. The assessment found that the chatbots did not consistently respond appropriately to mental-health concerns and could miss warning signs associated with conditions including psychosis, eating disorders, and post-traumatic stress disorder. Vasan, who was involved in the research, said that the systems did not consistently recognise the role they should play when responding to serious mental-health questions.

== Book ==
Vasan's experience as a young civic entrepreneur led to her co-authoring the #1 Amazon best-selling book Do Good Well: Your Guide to Leadership, Action and Innovation on how to maximize impact in solving social problems. Nobel Peace Prize Laureate Muhammad Yunus called the book "the primer for social innovation."
