= Interventional psychiatry =

Subspecialty of psychiatry

Interventional Psychiatry is a subspecialty within the field of psychiatry, focusing on the use of procedural and device-based treatments to manage mental health disorders, particularly those resistant to conventional therapies such as pharmacotherapy and psychotherapy. This field integrates neuromodulation methods with targeted pharmacological interventions, providing options for patients who have not responded to traditional treatments.

== Historical background ==
The origins of interventional psychiatry can be traced to the historical use of procedural treatments for psychiatric disorders, with Electroconvulsive Therapy (ECT) being a notable early example. Introduced in 1938 by Ugo Cerletti and Lucio Bini, ECT involves applying electrical currents to the brain to induce seizures, which can alleviate symptoms of severe depression, catatonia, and other psychiatric conditions. Despite its effectiveness, ECT has been subject to stigma due to concerns over side effects, particularly cognitive impairments.

During the latter half of the 20th century, the rise of psychopharmacology led to a decline in procedural treatments, as medications became the primary mode of treating mental health disorders. However, the lack of response in some patients to pharmacotherapy renewed interest in procedural treatments, eventually leading to the development of interventional psychiatry as a distinct subspecialty.

== Scope and treatments ==
Interventional psychiatry encompasses various treatments, primarily categorized into neuromodulation techniques and interventional pharmacology. These treatments are typically employed in cases of treatment-resistant mental health disorders.

=== Neuromodulation techniques ===
- Electroconvulsive Therapy (ECT): ECT remains a cornerstone of interventional psychiatry, especially for severe, treatment-resistant depression and catatonia. The procedure involves controlled electrical currents to the brain, inducing a seizure that can lead to significant improvements in mood and behavior.
- Transcranial Magnetic Stimulation (TMS): TMS is a non-invasive technique using magnetic fields to stimulate specific brain areas. It has been approved for treating major depressive disorder and is particularly useful for patients unresponsive to antidepressants. Unlike ECT, TMS does not require anesthesia and has a lower risk of cognitive side effects.
- Vagus Nerve Stimulation (VNS): VNS involves implanting a device that delivers electrical impulses to the vagus nerve, influencing brain activity. Initially developed for epilepsy treatment, VNS has also been approved for treatment-resistant depression.
- Deep Brain Stimulation (DBS): DBS is an invasive procedure involving the surgical implantation of electrodes in specific brain areas. These electrodes deliver electrical impulses to modulate brain circuits involved in mood regulation. DBS is currently used for conditions such as Parkinson’s disease and obsessive-compulsive disorder and is being explored as a treatment for severe depression.
- Other Emerging Techniques: New modalities such as focused ultrasound (FUS), transcranial direct current stimulation (tDCS), and magnetic seizure therapy (MST) are under investigation for potential psychiatric applications, offering the possibility of more targeted and less invasive interventions.

=== Interventional pharmacology ===
- Ketamine and Esketamine: Ketamine, an anesthetic, has shown rapid antidepressant effects in patients with treatment-resistant depression. It is administered intravenously in controlled settings. Esketamine, a derivative of ketamine, is available as a nasal spray and has been approved for use with oral antidepressants for treatment-resistant depression.
- Other Pharmacological Interventions: This category includes intravenous brexanolone, used for postpartum depression, and emerging therapies involving psychedelics such as psilocybin, which are being studied for their potential to enhance psychotherapy and treat refractory depression.

== Fellowship programs ==
The demand for specialized training has led to the creation of fellowship programs dedicated to interventional psychiatry. These fellowships typically last one year and provide comprehensive training in various interventional modalities, including both neuromodulation techniques and interventional pharmacology. Fellows gain experience in patient selection, procedural techniques, and side effect management, along with exposure to emerging treatments and research opportunities.

== Stigma and public perception ==
Interventional psychiatry faces challenges related to stigma, both within the medical community and the general public.
