= Psychiatry Innovation Lab =

The Psychiatry Innovation Lab is an incubator at the American Psychiatric Association that catalyzes the formation of innovative ventures to transform mental healthcare. It was founded by American psychiatrist and author Dr. Nina Vasan in 2015. The Lab nurtures early-stage ideas and ventures by investing in them with mentorship, education, funding, and collaboration opportunities with a community of mental health innovators.

The Lab centers around a live event at the bi-annual Meeting of the American Psychiatric Association, the largest psychiatric organization in the world. This event brings together top leaders in psychiatry with experts in business, technology, medicine, and government, who collaborate with the finalists.

== Format ==
Finalists and Semi-Finalists are invited to present their ideas live, ‘Shark Tank’-style, to a panel of judges at the American Psychiatric Association bi-annual meeting. They have the opportunity to work closely with industry experts to improve their idea. The Finalist teams give final pitches to the judges and audience, and the winners are selected. Prizes are donated by the sponsoring companies and individuals.

== First Psychiatry Innovation Lab (Atlanta, Georgia) ==
The inaugural Psychiatry Innovation Lab took place on May 15, 2015 at the American Psychiatric Association Annual Meeting in Atlanta, Georgia. NeuroLex Diagnostics won the Grand Prize Award sponsored by Doctor on Demand and was also selected by the audience as the winner of the Audience Choice Award. Neurolex helps to diagnose psychosis early by analyzing speech samples using artificial intelligence.

== Second Psychiatry Innovation Lab (Washington, D.C.) ==
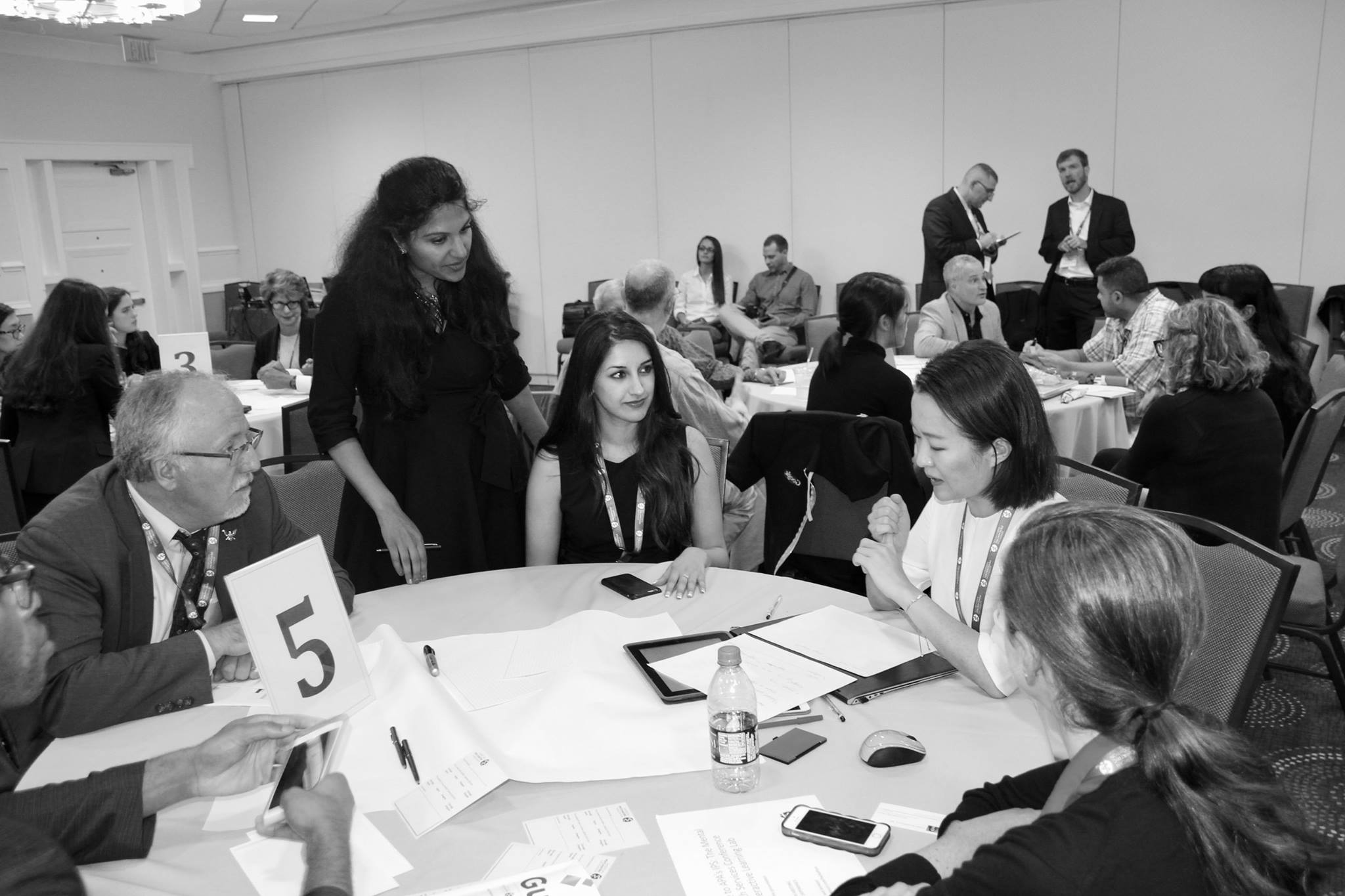
Second Psychiatry Innovation Lab in progress

The second Psychiatry Innovation Lab took place on October 7, 2016 at the American Psychiatric Association meeting in Washington, D.C. Joseph Insler won the Grand Prize award with his medical device called "Overdose Recovery Bracelet" to prevent opioid overdoses. The award for Most Promising Innovation went to April Koh for Spring, which uses machine learning to identify the best antidepressant for a patient.

== Third Psychiatry Innovation Lab (San Diego, California) ==
The third Psychiatry Innovation Lab will take place on May 21, 2017 at the American Psychiatric Association Annual Meeting in San Diego, California, with a record-high prize purse. Multiple prizes will be awarded, including the Accelerator Prize. To embrace the growing and fast-moving role that technology is playing in mental health care, the American Psychiatric Association will debut the Mental Health Innovation Zone that was designed by Nina Taylor, Deputy Director of Education for the American Psychiatric Association. The Psychiatry Innovation Lab will be the centerpiece of the Innovation Zone.
